= Will Cowan =

American film director and producer (1912–1994)

For other people with similar names see William Cowan

Will Cowan (1912 – January 4, 1994) was a director and producer of films. He was born in Scotland.

== Filmography ==
- Pony Post (1940), producer
- Boss of Bullion City (1940), producer
- Man from Montana (1941), producer
- Fighting Bill Fargo (1941), producer
- Rawhide Rangers (1941), producer
- The Masked Rider (1941), producer
- Arizona Cyclone (1941), producer
- Bury Me Not on the Lone Prairie (1941), producer
- Keeping Fit (1942), producer
- Boss of Hangtown Mesa (1942), producer
- Stagecoach Buckaroo (1942), producer
- Get Going (1943), producer
- He's My Guy (1943), producer
- Gals, Incorporated (1943), producer
- Jungle Woman (1944), co-producer
- Dead Man's Eyes (1944), co-producer
- The Frozen Ghost (1945), producer
- Honeymoon Ahead (1945), producer
- The Dark Horse, producer
- Idea Girl (1946), producer
- Girl Time (1947), director
- Symphony in Swing (1948), director and producer
- Lenny Hambro (1949), director
- Ted Fio Rito and His Orchestra (1949), producer and director
- The Pecos Pistol (1949), producer and director
- Sugar Chile Robinson, Billie Holiday, Count Basie and His Sextet (1950), director
- Tales of the West: Cactus Caravan / South of Santa Fe (1950)
- Jimmy Dorsey's Varieties (1952)
- House Party (1953) with Andy Russell and Della Russell
- Champ Butler Sings (1954) short, starring Champ Butler
- Roundup of Rhythm (1954) with Bill Haley and the Comets
- Rhythms with Rusty (1956), director
- Golden Ladder (1957), director / producer, a musical featurette starring Gogi Grant
- Riot in Rhythm (1957), director
- The Big Beat (1958), director and producer
- The Thing That Couldn't Die (1958), director
