= William Bennett Kilpack =

Actor, director and playwright (1883–1962)

Bennett Kilpack
- Born: William Bennett Kilpack; February 6, 1883; Long Melford, Suffolk, United Kingdom
- Died: August 17, 1962 (aged 79); Santa Monica, California, United States
- Resting place: Pacific Crest Cemetery, Redondo Beach, California, United States
- Occupations: Actor; Director; Playwright
- Years active: 1908–1950
- Notable work: Mr. Keen, Tracer of Lost Persons (1314 episodes, 1937–1950)
- Spouses: Mabel Alice Cromer (m. 1909; div. 1925); Dorothy Young Schisler (m. 1940; died 1955)
- Children: 1 (adopted)

William Bennett Kilpack (February 6, 1883 in Long Melford – August 17, 1962 in Santa Monica) known simply as Bennett Kilpack, was a British-American actor, director and playwright. He is best known for his performances in the title role of Mr. Keen, Tracer of Lost Persons (from 1937–1947 on NBC Radio's Blue Network, which became the ABC network in 1945, then from 1947 to 1955 on CBS Radio). The drama was one of radio's longest running Old-Time Radio shows (October 12, 1937 to April 19, 1955), continuing well into the television era.

== Acting career ==
Unable to find an engineering job in the United States, he became an actor. Kilpack's first acting job was as Michael Cassio in Othello. World War I interrupted Kilpack's early stage career; he became a member of the Royal Flying Corps and was stationed in Canada as salvage department head at a large flying field. In this capacity, he dismantled the plane in which Vernon Castle, the dancer, crashed.

He toured with Sir Philip Ben Greet's Shakespearean players, had several important parts in Broadway plays, and in 1927 was given the lead role in The Wayside Inn, an early radio serial. He subsequently played the part of Cephus in Way Back Home, which was presented on radio and as a film, with Phillips Lord as Seth Parker. As a radio serial it was also known as Sunday Night at Seth Parker's. Kilpack made his CBS debut in 1935 in Vanished Voices and subsequently played roles on CBS Radio in Hilltop House, Gang Busters, The Goldbergs, The Shadow and Grand Central Station.

Kilpack began his run as Mr. Keen in 1937. For 18 years Keen and his faithful assistant, Mike Clancy, entertained followers with their intuitive perception that kept listeners coming back for more. With 1690 nationwide broadcasts, Mr. Keen was the most resilient private detective in a namesake role. The nearest competitors were Nick Carter, Master Detective (726 broadcasts), The Adventures of Sherlock Holmes (657) and The Adventures of the Falcon (473). Over a span of 13 years, Bennett appeared on nearly 1300 of the 1690 broadcasts. At age 67, Bennett made his last appearance as Mr. Keen on October 26, 1950, the show's 1314th broadcast.

== Family life ==
Bennett married Mabel Alice Cromer (1890–1909) in Boston, MA. Kilpack sent his wife to Paris but, according to The New York Times, failed to follow her there as he promised, so she divorced him there in March 1925 on grounds of desertion.

In September 1940, Bennett married a second time, to Dorothy Young Schisler (Mrs. Meryle Raymond Schisler, née Young). Dorothy had been married once before, to Meryle Raymond Schisler (b. 1905) Dorothy and Meryle were married Dorothy October 17, 1932, in Mount Vernon, NY.

Prior to marrying Meryle and Bennett, Dorothy had a son, John Charles Stressling, born August 15, 1927, whom Bennett adopted, changing his surname to Kilpack. John's natural father, an emigrant from Germany, had died in an auto accident.

John Charlie Young (sic), was admitted to St. Christopher's in Dobbs Ferry on October 4, 1935 — a school that, at the time, admitted only protestant children of single parents. Records show that he was the child of a single parent — Dorothy Young — and that he was being raised by his maternal grandmother, Susan S. Young (née Griggs, 1876–1954). John met Admission criteria primarily because his grandmother, Susan S. Young, who had become a widow in April 1935, did not have means of support. Also, his mother, Dorothy was single at the time and did not have a job. John's room and board was financed by a foundation connected to St. Christopher's. John's mother later contributed money towards his room and board. John was discharged from the school on June 27, 1941. John Graduated from St. John's School in June 1945.

Dorothy died December 1, 1955, in Southampton, Bermuda. Dorothy was born on January 11, 1910, in Dedham, Massachusetts. Dorothy died of an overdose of sleeping pills (barbiturates). At that time, she and Bennett had vacation homes in Dover, Vermont, and Bermuda.

Bennett died of cancer in Santa Monica in 1962 and was buried at Pacific Crest Cemetery in Redondo Beach, California. John Charles Kilpack, who had changed his surname back to Stressling, died in 2006, in Sun City, California.

== Citizenship and early years ==
Bennett Kilpack was the third of seven (four boys, three girls) born to William Gilbert Kilpack, a clergyman, and Maria Theresia Hennequin. Kilpack claims lineal descent from the poet, Alfred Tennyson. He attended school at Sutton, England, St. John's College, Finsbury Technical College and the London Oratory School. He immigrated to Canada (from England) for his first job as apprentice in a locomotive factory whence he soon graduated to become an electrical engineer for the Canadian Pacific Railway in Montreal, Quebec.

Despite having served in the Royal Flying Corps. in Canada, Bennett had two U.S. Draft Cards, one for World War I and one for World War II.
