= Jean Brooks =

American actress (1915–1963)

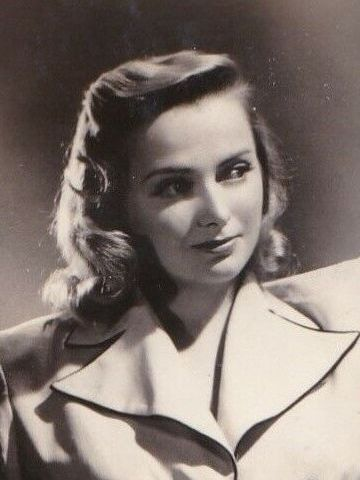
- Brooks in the 1940s
- Born: Ruby Matilda Kelly; December 23, 1915; Houston, Texas, U.S.
- Died: November 25, 1963 (aged 47); Richmond, California, U.S.
- Resting place: Remains scattered into the Pacific Ocean
- Other names: Jeanne Kelly; Robina Duarte; Jean Brooks
- Occupations: Actress; singer
- Years active: 1935–1948
- Spouses: Richard Brooks (m. 1941; div. 1944) William Douglas Lansford (m. 1946; div. 1956) Thomas Leddy (m. 1956)

Jean Brooks (born Ruby Matilda Kelly; December 23, 1915 – November 25, 1963) was an American film actress and singer who appeared in over thirty films. Though she never achieved major stardom in Hollywood, she had several prominent roles in the early 1940s as a contract player for RKO Radio Pictures.

Born in Houston, Brooks spent her early life in Texas and Costa Rica. She began her career as a club singer and guitarist in New York City before being cast in several minor walk-on parts in films. She would later appear in supporting roles in the Universal Pictures serials Flash Gordon Conquers the Universe (1940), The Green Hornet Strikes Again! (1941), and (as the female lead) Riders of Death Valley (1941). In 1942, Brooks signed a contract with RKO and appeared in multiple films by the studio, including Jacques Tourneur's The Leopard Man (1943), Mark Robson's horror noir The Seventh Victim (1943), and drama Youth Runs Wild (1944), as well as several films in the Falcon series.

Her later life and career were marred by struggles with alcoholism, and a series of drunken public appearances resulted in Brooks ending her contract with RKO. In 1948, she made her final film appearance in Women in the Night (1948) before abandoning her career as an actress and relocating to San Francisco, California. She died in 1963 of complications resulting from her alcoholism.

== Early life ==
Brooks was born Ruby Matilda Kelly on December 23, 1915, (Note: Although Richard Brooks biographer Douglass Daniel lists her birth year as 1916, the 1920 U.S. Census taken on January 3, 1920, lists "Ruby M. Kelly" of Harris County, Texas as being age four (see National Archives and Records Administration, 1992, roll 1814; FHL microfilm 1,821,814, sheet no. 2B).) in Houston, Texas, the fourth child of Horace and Robina Kelly. Through her mother, Brooks was of English and Canadian descent. Her two older brothers, Horace Jr. and Ernest, were both teenagers at the time she was born; a third son had died in 1912 at age seven of tetanus.

Brooks spent her early years in Texas but after her father's death during her childhood, she and her mother relocated to Costa Rica, her mother's native country. There, they lived on Brooks' grandfather's coffee plantation. As a result, Brooks was fluent in both English and Spanish. During her teenage years, Brooks relocated with her mother to New York City, with plans to attend college.

== Career ==
=== Beginnings ===
Brooks began her professional career as a singer at New York City's Waldorf-Astoria Hotel, where she sang and performed as a guitarist in Enric Madriguera's orchestra. She adopted the name Jeanne Kelly for her entertainment career, so as not to be confused with actress Ruby Keeler. Her first screen role was in Republic's Frankie and Johnnie (filmed in New York in 1934, released 1936), She had the ingenue role -- billed as Jeane Kelly -- in the Arcturus Pictures release Obeah! (1935), a dramatization of Phillips H. Lord's South Seas trip aboard the schooner Seth Parker.

In 1935 she appeared in two features filmed in New York: Paramount's Spanish-language Tango-Bar (1935), and Republic's The Crime of Dr. Crespi (1935), starring Erich von Stroheim. Kelly had met von Stroheim while working at the Waldorf-Astoria; she parted ways with von Stroheim after Crespi. She then acted in the stage melodrama Name Your Poison, opposite Lenore Ulric, which premiered at the Sam S. Shubert Theatre in Newark, New Jersey on January 20, 1936. While in New York, like other stage actors, she worked in movie shorts for Vitaphone; she appeared in two Ken Murray comedies.

In 1938, after a failed screen test with 20th Century Fox and the collapse of Major Productions (who had signed Kelly three weeks before going out of business), she signed a contract to star in Spanish-language films for Paramount Pictures. She landed two starring roles with Paramount, acting under the stage name Robina Duarte; her fluency in Spanish allowed her to play the parts effectively.

After the Paramount contract was completed, Kelly spent another year taking bit parts. In 1940, she signed a contract with Universal Pictures, playing bit parts and minor roles in features (she is seen briefly in Abbott and Costello's Buck Privates) and serials. Kelly was awarded with her first leading role in a feature film, the Richard Arlen-Andy Devine adventure The Devil's Pipeline in 1940. She hadn't much to do, as Box Office Digest reported: "Romantic interest is at a minimum with Jeanne Kelly taking adequate care of it." Universal still saw her potential, and gave her the female lead in the all-star western serial Riders of Death Valley.

In 1941, Jeanne Kelly married writer and future film director Richard Brooks. (Though this is known to have been her second marriage, there is no information on her first.) Universal began losing interest in the actress; the studio loaned her out to 20th Century-Fox in April 1941 for Charlie Chan in Rio, but the assignment didn't work out and Kelly did not appear in the finished film. Universal dropped Jeanne Kelly from its roster.

=== RKO films ===
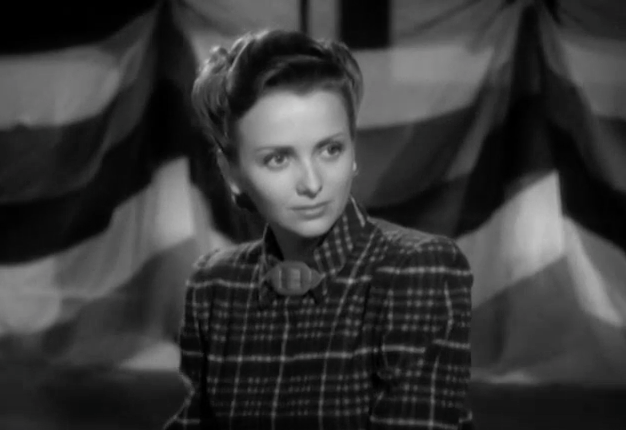
Brooks in The Falcon in Danger (1943)

In October 1942 Kelly, now using her married name Jean Brooks, applied for a job at RKO Radio Pictures. Chief talent executive Ben Piazza commissioned a screen test, photographed on 16mm Kodachrome color film by Jack Bentley, RKO's screen-test cameraman. The test was successful—individual frames were featured in Home Movies magazine—and RKO signed Jean Brooks to a long-term contract.

At RKO, Brooks was to achieve her greatest success. She played a variety of leads, although above-the-title stardom eluded her. She became a regular in The Falcon mystery movies (appearing in six, through 1946) and was cast as the heroine Kiki Walker in the Val Lewton-produced horror film The Leopard Man (1943), directed by Jacques Tourneur. The film received a dismissive review in The New York Times from critic Bosley Crowther, who wrote: "The most horrifying thing about it is that it actually gets on a screen."

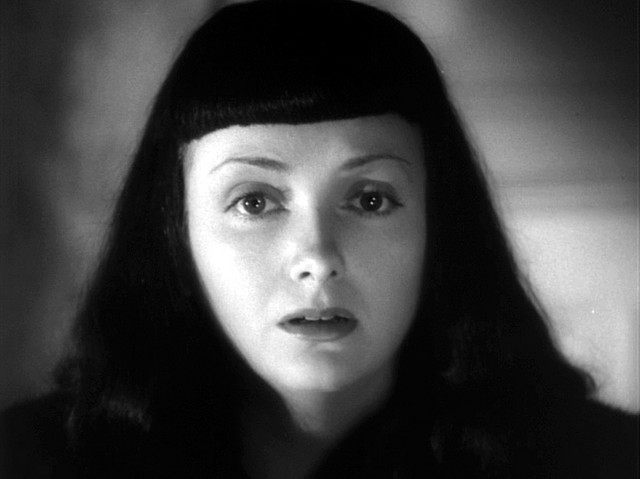
Brooks in The Seventh Victim (1943)

After filming The Leopard Man, Brooks appeared in a second horror film produced by Val Lewton, playing the depressed devil-worshipper Jacqueline Gibson in The Seventh Victim (1943), the role for which she is most perhaps most widely remembered today. Though the film did not fare well with audiences at the time of its release, it would go on to receive acclaim from critics in the subsequent decades. Coincidentally, while portraying the depressed Jacqueline, Brooks' own life was falling apart: During the filming of The Seventh Victim, Brooks had separated from her husband; she and Richard Brooks divorced the following year in 1944. It was also widely rumored at the time that she had begun drinking heavily. Cecilia Maskell, the daughter of Brooks' cousin, Gloria White, later claimed that alcoholism ran in her family.

=== Alcoholism and retirement ===
After her much-publicized divorce from Richard Brooks in 1944, Jean remained in Los Angeles and attempted to resume her career. Though she continued to land prominent roles with RKO throughout 1944, most notably The Falcon and the Co-eds and Lewton's juvenile delinquency film Youth Runs Wild, her career began to unravel and she was noticeably gaining weight as a result of her heavy drinking. She arrived at the September 1945 premiere of First Yank into Tokyo intoxicated; Kurt Crivello, a film historian who was at the premiere, described her appearance: "Jean Brooks, sad to say, was smashed. She was very, very drunk; she must have been drinking all night on the train ... some of the people there were laughing at her. Anne Jeffreys and Jane Greer looked so embarrassed. It was really very sad." In other instances, Brooks would reportedly pass out in public.

By 1946, Brooks's stock at RKO had plunged to an all-time low: having played feminine leads in the Falcon pictures, she was now reduced to a bit part in The Falcon's Alibi. Her struggles with alcoholism and her disheveled public appearances resulted in friction with RKO executives, and Brooks reportedly tore up her contract before they could fire her. Film historian Doug McClelland referred to Brooks as "RKO's resident neurotic" based on her behavior while working for the studio. Her final film with RKO was the war drama The Bamboo Blonde, released in July 1946. Two years later, Brooks made her final screen appearance in the William Rowland-directed exploitation drama Women in the Night (1948), filmed independently in Mexico and released by Film Classics.

== Personal life ==
Brooks married screenwriter Richard Brooks in 1941; they divorced on September 13, 1944 in Los Angeles. In 1946, Brooks met newly returned Marine Corps veteran, William Douglas Lansford, and they married. The marriage lasted 10 years, most of which were spent while Lansford was back in the armed forces (Army) and they were stationed at various bases in the U.S. It was a happy time for her while she formed amateur theater groups and worked in productions along with her husband, who was a writer, at the various places they were stationed. However, Brooks's alcoholism persisted. Lansford, too, was a heavy drinker and soon it overwhelmed the marriage. They were divorced in 1956 and Lansford remarried Ruth Ketcham of Long Island, New York.

In 1956 Brooks wed San Francisco Examiner editor Thomas H. Leddy, to whom she was married until her death. A Protestant, Brooks converted to Roman Catholicism for the marriage. The couple resided in San Francisco, where Brooks worked as a solicitor for classified ads.

=== Death ===
In November 1963, Brooks was admitted to Kaiser Richmond Field Hospital in Richmond, California, suffering from complications from Laënnec's cirrhosis, which she had lived with the previous five years. She fell into a hepatic coma and died of the condition at 6:35 p.m. on November 25, 1963, at 47 years of age. Her death certificate noted that she had suffered from "nutritional inadequacy" for 15 years, probably stemming from her alcoholism.

Brooks was buried at sea the following year, on September 10, 1964. Her burial was reported in the papers in Costa Rica, though there were no obituaries, and no reports of her passing reached Hollywood.

On August 7, 1990, 27 years after Brooks's death, the following appeared in The Hollywood Reporter: "Anyone know the whereabouts of Jean Brooks? Once married to director Richard Brooks, thus her name, she was aka Jeanne Kelly and under contract to both Universal and RKO in the 1940s ... Even Richard B[rooks] and several of the actress' former pals say they've lost all contact with her." Her ex-husband, Richard Brooks, died in 1992 without knowing her whereabouts or death.

== Filmography ==
Year	Title	Role	Notes	Ref.
1934	Frankie and Johnnie	—N/a	filmed in 1934; released in 1936	
1935	Obeah!	—N/a	Credited as Jeane Kelly	
1935	Tango-Bar	—N/a	Uncredited	
1935	The Crime of Dr. Crespi	Miss Gordon	Credited as Jeanne Kelly	
1936	The Wife of the Party	The Wife	Vitaphone two-reel comedy with Ken Murray	
1937	Wedding Yells	—N/a	Vitaphone two-reel comedy with Ken Murray	
1938	El Trovador de la radio	Nina	Credited as Robina Duarte	
1939	El Milagro de la calle mayor	Nina	Credited as Robina Duarte	
1939	El otro soy yo	—N/a	Credited as Robina Duarte	
1939	The Invisible Killer	Gloria Cunningham		
1939	Miracle on Main Street	Nina	Credited as Jeanne Kelly	
1940	The Invisible Man Returns	—N/a	Uncredited	
1940	Flash Gordon Conquers the Universe	Olga	Serial; uncredited	
1940	Son of Roaring Dan	Eris Brooke	Credited as Jeanne Kelly	
1940	The Devil's Pipeline	Laura Larson		
1941	The Green Hornet Strikes Again!	Gloria Manning	Serial	
1941	Buck Privates	Camp Hostess	Credited as Jeanne Kelly	
1941	Meet the Chump	Madge Reilly	Credited as Jeanne Kelly	
1941	A Dangerous Game	Anne Bennett	Credited as Jeanne Kelly	
1941	Too Many Blondes	Agel De Vol	Credited as Jeanne Kelly	
1941	For Beauty's Sake	Beauty Shop Operator	Credited as Jeanne Kelly	
1941	Riders of Death Valley	Mary Morgan	Serial; credited as Jeanne Kelly	
1941	Man from Montana	Linda Thompson	Credited as Jeanne Kelly	
1941	Badlands of Dakota	Bella Union Girl	Uncredited	
1941	Fighting Bill Fargo	Linda Tyler	Credited as Jeanne Kelly	
1942	Klondike Fury	Rae Langton		
1942	Boot Hill Bandits	May Meadows		
1942	The Boss of Big Town	Iris Moore		
1943	The Falcon Strikes Back	Spanish Girl	Uncredited	
1943	The Leopard Man	Kiki Walker		
1943	The Falcon in Danger	Iris Fairchild		
1943	The Seventh Victim	Jacqueline Gibson		
1943	The Falcon and the Co-eds	Vicky Gaines		
1944	A Night of Adventure	Julie Arden		
1944	Youth Runs Wild	Mary Hauser Coates		
1944	The Falcon in Hollywood	Roxanna Miles		
1945	Two O'Clock Courage	Barbara Borden		
1946	The Falcon's Alibi	Baroness Lena		
1946	The Bamboo Blonde	Marsha		
1948	Women in the Night	Maya		

== Stage credits ==
Year	Title	Role	Venue	Ref.
1936	Name Your Poison	—N/a	Sam S. Shubert Theatre (Newark, New Jersey)	

== Works cited ==
- Blottner, Gene (December 30, 2010) [2003]. Universal Sound Westerns, 1929–1946: The Complete Filmography. McFarland. ISBN 978-0-7864-6079-3.
- Daniel, Douglass K. (2011). Tough as Nails: The Life and Films of Richard Brooks. Wisconsin Film Studies. University of Wisconsin Press. ISBN 978-0-299-25124-6.
- Kinnard, Roy; Crnkovich, Tony; Vitone, R.J. (2011). The Flash Gordon Serials, 1936–1940: A Heavily Illustrated Guide. McFarland. ISBN 978-0-7864-6615-3.
- Mank, Gregory William (2005). Women in Horror Films, 1940s. McFarland. ISBN 978-0-7864-2335-4.
- Mank, Gregory William. "The Mystery of Jean Brooks: Angel in a Cleopatra Wig". Midnight Marquee (Winter 1994): 6–17.
- Mayer, Geoff (2017). Encyclopedia of American Film Serials. McFarland. ISBN 978-0-786477623.
- McElwee, John (2013). Showmen, Sell It Hot!: Movies as Merchandise in Golden Era Hollywood. Paladin Communications. ISBN 978-0-9711685-9-6.
- Peary, Danny (1986). Guide for the Film Fanatic. Simon & Schuster. ISBN 978-0-671-61081-4.
- Raw, Lawrence (2012). Character Actors in Horror and Science Fiction Films, 1930–1960. McFarland. ISBN 978-0-7864-4474-8.
- Senn, Bryan (2006) [1996]. Golden Horrors: An Illustrated Critical Filmography of Terror Cinema, 1931–1939. McFarland. ISBN 978-0-7864-2724-6.
- Snelson, Tim (2014). Phantom Ladies: Hollywood Horror and the Home Front. Rutgers University Press. ISBN 978-0-8135-7042-6.
- Weaver, Tom; Brunas, Michael; Brunas, John (February 15, 2007). Universal Horrors: The Studio's Classic Films, 1931–1946 (2nd ed.). McFarland. ISBN 978-0-7864-2974-5.
- Wilkerson Daily Corporation (August 7, 1990). "Rambling Reporter". The Hollywood Reporter. Vol. 313, no. 35–50.
