= Prairie Hill, Texas =

Prairie Hill is the name of multiple communities in the U.S. state of Texas:

- Prairie Hill, Limestone County, Texas
- Prairie Hill, Washington County, Texas
