= Ann Morriss =

American actress (1919–1994)

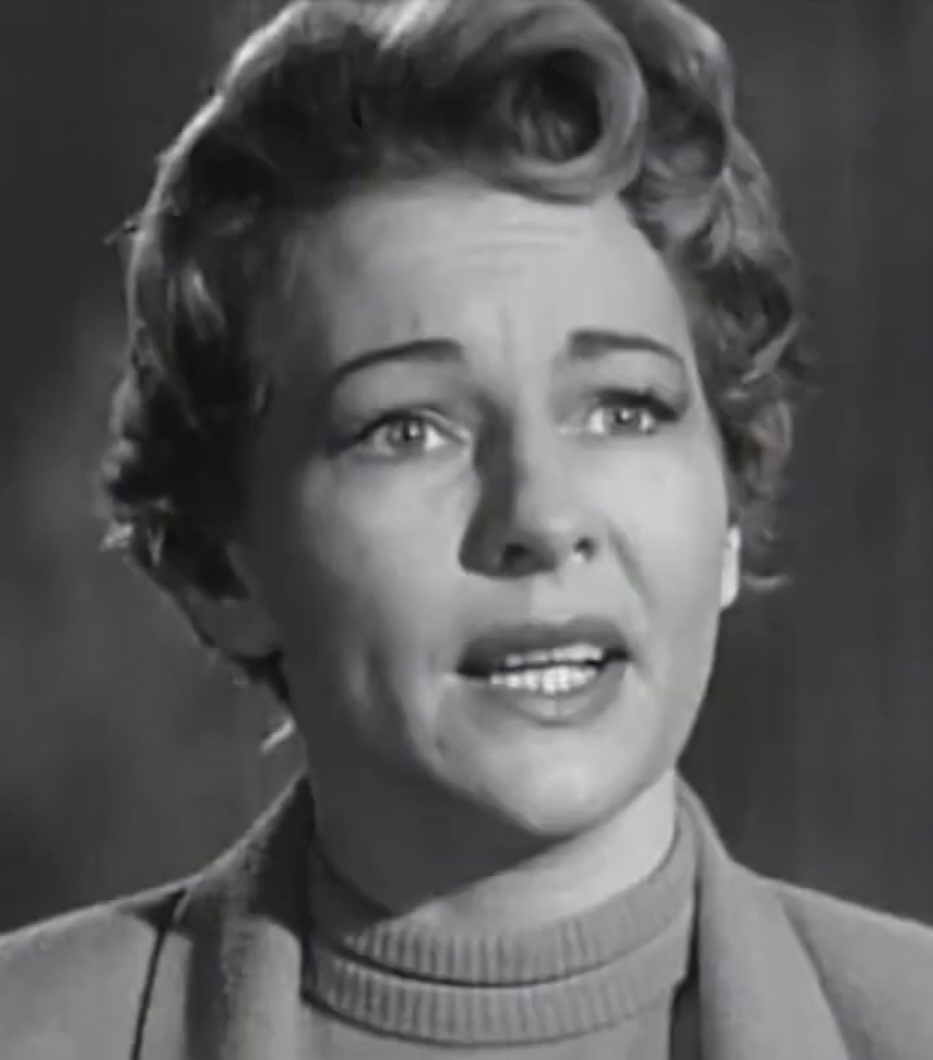
- Morriss in an episode of The Public Defender (1955)
- Born: August 5, 1919; Tampa, Florida, U.S.
- Died: June 30, 1994 (aged 74); Bellevue, Washington, U.S.
- Resting place: Sunset Hills Memorial Park, Bellevue, WA
- Occupation: Actress
- Years active: 1938–1960
- Spouse: Edwin L. Marin (m. 1940; died 1951)
- Children: 3

Ann Morriss (born August 5, 1919 – June 30, 1994) was an American actress and the wife of director Edwin L. Marin.

== Personal life ==
Morris married to film director Edwin L. Marin in December 1940, during which she was under contract to MGM. They had three children: Denis Anthony, Reese Andrew and Randi Alexandra with whom she would survive husband Edwin when he passed in 1951.

== Death ==
Morriss died June 30, 1994 and was buried at Sunset Hills Memorial Park in Bellevue, WA.

== Filmography ==
=== Film ===
- The Chaser (1938) as Dorothy Mason
- Spring Madness (1938) as Frances
- Honolulu (1939) as Gale Brewster
- Within the Law (1939) as Saleswoman
- Society Lawyer (1939) as Judy Barton
- The Hardys Ride High (1939) as Rosamund
- The Women (1939) as Excersice Instructress
- Think First (Crime Does Not Pay short) (1939) as Susy Martin
- Broadway Melody of 1940 (1940) as Pearl Delonge
- The Ghost Comes Home (1940) as Myra
- Jack Pot (Crime Does Not Pay short) (1940) as Rocky's Moll
- And One Was Beautiful (1940) as Gertrude Hunter
- Third Finger, Left Hand (1940) as Beth Hampshire
- Hullabalo (1940) as Wilma Norton
- I'll Wait for You (1941) as Miss Evans
- Blossoms in the Dust (1941) as Mrs. Loring
- Life Begins for Andy Hardy (1941) as Miss Dean, Fur Salesgirl
- Pushover (1954) as Ellen Burnett
- The Private War of Major Benson (1955) as Miss Dunne
- The Proud and Profane (1956) as Pat
- The Opposite Sex (1956) as Sydney's Receptionist
- The Great American Pastime (1956) as Mrs. George Carruthers
- Slander (1957) as Miss Turner
- Designing Woman (1957) as Marie Dozier
- Guns Don't Argue (1957) as Mildred Jaunce, The Lady in Red
- The High Cost of Loving (1958) as Martha
- But Not For Me (1959) as Minor Role
- One Foot in Hell (1960) as Nellie (final film role)

=== Television ===
- Gang Busters (1952) as Midred Jaunce
- The Public Defender (1954–1955) (3 episodes) as Lucy Dalton/Stella Lancaster/Marcy Craig
- Passport to Danger (1956)
- The Brothers (1956)
- I Led 3 Lives (1956) as Comrade Lili
- Code 3 (1957) as Miss Connel
- Studio 57 (1958) as Cathy
- Whirlybirds (1958) as Mary Burdette
- The Thin Man (1958) as Lucy
- Highway Patrol (1958) as Blanche Cornin
- Colt .45 (1959) as Anne Ryan
- The Ann Sothern Show (1959) as Edna
- The Donna Reed Show (1959–1960) as Eleanor Moody/Fran
- Lock-Up (1960) as Isabel Metcalfe (final television role)
