= Top-rated United States television programs of 1951–52 =

This table displays the top-rated primetime television series of the 1951–52 season as measured by Nielsen Media Research.

Rank	Program	Network	Rating
1	Arthur Godfrey's Talent Scouts	CBS	53.8
2	Texaco Star Theater	NBC	52.0
3	I Love Lucy	CBS	50.9
4	The Red Skelton Show	NBC	50.2
5	The Colgate Comedy Hour	NBC	45.3
6	Arthur Godfrey and His Friends	CBS	43.3
7	Fireside Theatre	NBC	43.1
8	Your Show of Shows	NBC	43.0
9	The Jack Benny Show	CBS	42.8
10	You Bet Your Life	NBC	42.1
11	Mama	CBS	41.3
12	Philco TV Playhouse	NBC	40.4
13	Amos 'n' Andy	CBS	38.9
14	Gangbusters	NBC	38.7
15	Big Town	CBS	38.5
16	Goodyear TV Playhouse	NBC	37.8
17	Pabst Blue Ribbon Bouts	CBS	37.5
18	The Lone Ranger	ABC	36.8
19	Gillette Cavalcade of Sports	NBC	36.5
20	All Star Revue	NBC	36.3
20	Dragnet	NBC	36.3
22	The Alan Young Show	CBS	35.8
23	Kraft Television Theatre	NBC	34.8
24	Armstrong Circle Theatre	NBC	34.7
25	Strike It Rich	CBS	34.5
26	Robert Montgomery Presents	NBC	34.4
27	The Roy Rogers Show	NBC	32.7
28	Hopalong Cassidy	NBC	32.2
29	Man Against Crime	CBS	32.0
29	Racket Squad	CBS	32.0
