= Obeah! =

- Directed by: F. Herrick Herrick
- Written by: Robert Carse
- Story by: F. Herrick Herrick
- Starring: Jean Brooks; Phillips H. Lord
- Cinematography: Harry W. Smith
- Edited by: Leonard Weiss
- Production company: Arcturus Pictures
- Release date: February 1935
- Running time: 75 minutes
- Country: United States
- Language: English

Obeah! is a 1935 American horror film directed by F. Herrick Herrick and starring Jean Brooks and Phillips Lord. In the United Kingdom, the film was released under the title The Mystery Ship. It is believed to be a lost film, as no copies of it are known to exist.

== Plot ==
A sailor, known as "The Adventurer," searching for a lost American explorer discovers him being held hostage on a remote island in the South Sea. The man is held captive by the island's natives, who have placed him under a voodoo spell known as "obeah." The Adventurer attempts to halt a death ritual but fails, and the explorer dies. The Adventurer is forced to flee the island, taking with him a native woman and the daughter of the dead explorer.

With the help of a map taken from the explorer, the three attempt to locate a chest of gold that has been sunk off the island shore. Meanwhile, the high priest of the island people casts a curse on the three, and a love triangle ensues between those on the ship. (Note: This plot summary is based entirely on a re-published article provided by the American Film Institute, extracted from The Film Daily (February 1935))

== Cast ==
- Jean Brooks
- Phillips H. Lord as The Adventurer
- Alice Wessler
- Alexander McCatty

== Production ==
The film was produced by the New York City-based production company Arcturus Pictures. Based on a story by director F. Herrick Herrick, the film's script was written by Robert Carse, the film's production began in June 1934 and lasted several weeks. The film was shot on location in Kingston, Jamaica.

An additional article published in Film Daily claimed the film's shoot lasted a total of eleven months, shot on a worldwide cruise that stopped in over twenty countries. Later trade reports reported the shoot had only lasted four months. The ship's crew as well as various unknown performers appear in the film. Scenes were filmed at Papine and Port Royal, alongside interior shots in downtown Kingston bars.

== See also ==
- List of lost films

== Works cited ==
- Polack, Peter (2017). Jamaica, the Land of Film. Cambridge Scholars Publishing. ISBN 978-1-443-87375-8.
