= Sky Raiders =

1941 film by Ford Beebe, Ray Taylor

- Film poster
- Directed by: Ford Beebe; Ray Taylor
- Written by: Eliot Gibbons; Clarence Upson Young; Paul Huston
- Produced by: Henry MacRae
- Starring: Donald Woods; Billy Halop; Robert Armstrong; Eduardo Ciannelli; Kathryn Adams
- Cinematography: Jerome Ash; William A. Sickner
- Edited by: Saul A. Goodkind (supervisor); Joseph Gluck; Louis Sackin; Alvin Todd
- Music by: Charles Previn
- Production company: Universal Pictures
- Distributed by: Universal Pictures
- Release date: April 8, 1941
- Running time: 12 chapters (227 minutes)
- Country: United States
- Language: English

Sky Raiders is a 12-episode 1941 Universal film serial. The serial was directed by Ford Beebe and Ray Taylor. Sky Raiders stars Donald Woods, Billy Halop, Robert Armstrong and Eduardo Ciannelli. Sky Raiders has little in common with Universal's other early-1940s espionage outings like Sea Raiders or Junior G-Men, although the serial is often lumped in together as if it is part of a series.

== Plot ==
Former World War I ace pilot Captain Bob Dayton is the owner of Sky Raiders, Inc., an aircraft company. Dayton has designed a bombsight and a new high speed fighter aircraft, the "Sky Raider". Dayton recruits young Tim Bryant, a member of Air Youth of America, to help him.

Nazi agent Felix Lynx attempts to steal these designs for his own country. Lynx is determined to seize this valuable new aircraft, with the help of his female accomplice Innis Clair and of a criminal named John KAne who happens to be a perfect double for Dayton. All attempts, however, to steal the fighter aircraft prototype, fail.

Dayton's new bombsight is being tested in Hawaii, and Lynx intercepts a Sikorsky S-45 flying boat on the way to Honolulu. After it is shot down, Dayton and his secretary Mary Blake who were on board, were rescued by a government cutter.

Lieutenant Carry and Tim meet the survivors but find that Lynx has sent his henchmen to finish the job. The foreign agents are killed when they hit an oncoming truck. Mary announces that she has become Mrs. Dayton.

=== Chapter titles ===
1. Wings of Disaster!
2. Death Rides the Storm
3. The Toll of Treachery
4. Battle in the Clouds
5. The Fatal Blast
6. Stark Terror!
7. Flaming Doom
8. The Plunge of Peril
9. Torturing Trials
10. Flash of Fate
11. Terror of the Storm
12. Winning Warriors!

_{Source:}

== Cast ==
- Donald Woods as Captain Bob Dayton / John Kane, World War I ace and co-owner of Sky Raiders, Inc.
- Billy Halop as Tim Bryant, member of the Air Youth of America
- Robert Armstrong as Lieutenant Ed Carey, co-owner of Sky Raiders, Inc.
- Eduardo Ciannelli as Felix Lynx, Nazi agent
- Kathryn Adams as Mary Blake, Sky Raiders, Inc.'s secretary
- Jacqueline Dalya as Innis Clair
- Jean Fenwick as The Countess Irene
- Reed Hadley as Caddens, one of Lynx's henchmen
- Irving Mitchell as R.S. Hinchfield
- Edgar Edwards as Teal, one of Lynx's henchmen
- John Holland as Hess, one of Lynx's henchmen
- Roy Gordon as Major General Fletcher
- Alex Callam as Captain Long
- Phil Warren as Bakeman, the crackpot with gun
- Bill Cody, Jr. as Jack Hurd, a young boy

== Production ==
Many exterior shots for Sky Raiders were made at the Grand Central Air Terminal, Glendale, California. A rare Phillips 1-B Aeroneer appears in the serial. Bob Dayton's personal aircraft is a Fairchild 24W-9 (c/n W-101, NC18688).

Aerial photography was a mixture of "fairly effective combinations of process-screen shots, (obvious) model work, stock footage and actual flying work by stunt pilot Jerry Jerome."

The aircraft used in Sky Raiders are:

- Bell YFM-1 Airacuda
- Fairchild 24W-9, c/n W-101, NC18688, c/n 2689, NC15346
- Fairchild Super 71 c/n 646, NC9174
- Kellett KD-1
- Monocoupe 90 c/n 526, NC192K (archive images)
- Pitcairn PCA-2 Autogiro AC-35 c/n J-91, NX70 (Note: Stock footage of the Pitcairn PCA-2 Autogiro, piloted by Amelia Earhart in 1931, was shown.)
- Phillips 1-B Aeroneer, c/n 1, NX16075
- Sikorsky S-45
- Spartan Executive 7W, c/n 7-W12, NC17613

=== Stunts ===
- Dave O'Brien
- Tom Steele
- Ken Terrell

== Reception ==
Reviewer Hans J. Wollstein, wrote in his review of Sky Raiders for Allmovie, "Universal catered to the young fans of aviation with this airborne serial, which featured a plucky kid –'Bowery Boy' Billy Halop – and plenty of 'sky riders'. Famous aviator Bob Dayton (Donald Woods) hires a bright member of the Air Youth of America, Tim (Halop), to help him finalize a hush-hush project: a new type of fighter plane and bombsight. This being 1941, plenty of enemy agents are after the invention, including the nefarious Felix Lynx (Eduardo Cianelli). It takes Dayton, Tim, and the co-owner of Sky Raiders, Inc., Lieutenant Ed Carey (Robert Armstrong) 12 breathless chapters before they are able to defeat the enemy. The final installment was quite appropriately entitled 'Winning Warriors'."

== See also ==
- List of film serials
- List of film serials by studio
- Junior G-Men
- Junior G-Men (serial)

Preceded by The Green Hornet Strikes Again! (1941)	Universal Serial; Sky Raiders (1941)	Succeeded by Riders of Death Valley (1941)
