= Hide-Out =

1934 film by W. S. Van Dyke

- Theatrical release poster
- Directed by: W.S. Van Dyke
- Written by: Mauri Grashin
- Produced by: Hunt Stromberg; W.S. Van Dyke
- Starring: Robert Montgomery; Maureen O'Sullivan; Edward Arnold
- Cinematography: Ray June; Sidney Wagner
- Edited by: Basil Wrangell
- Music by: William Axt
- Production company: Metro-Goldwyn-Mayer
- Distributed by: Loew's, Inc.
- Release date: August 24, 1934
- Running time: 81 minutes
- Country: United States
- Language: English

Hide-Out is a 1934 American comedy, crime, drama, romance film produced by MGM in 1934. Robert Montgomery and Maureen O'Sullivan star, with Edward Arnold and Elizabeth Patterson in support. Directed by W. S. Van Dyke, the film was nominated for an Academy Award for Best Writing - Original Story (Mauri Grashin). It was re-made in 1941 as I'll Wait for You.

== Plot ==
Lucky Wilson, a charming but reckless New York City racketeer, enjoys a life of crime and luxury until he is wounded while evading the police. Forced to flee the city, he takes refuge on a quiet Connecticut farm, where he is taken in by the kind-hearted Miller family.

As Lucky recovers, he struggles to adjust to the slower pace of country life but soon finds himself drawn to the farm’s simplicity and warmth. He becomes especially enamored with Pauline Miller, the family's beautiful and innocent daughter. While initially planning to leave as soon as he is well enough, Lucky begins to question whether he truly wants to return to his old life.

As the police close in on him, Lucky must decide between returning to the city and facing justice or embracing the possibility of redemption and a new beginning with Pauline.

== Cast ==
- Robert Montgomery as Jonathan 'Lucky' Wilson
- Maureen O'Sullivan as Pauline Miller
- Edward Arnold as Det. Lt. 'Mac' MacCarthy
- Elizabeth Patterson as 'Ma' Miller
- Whitford Kane as Henry Miller
- Mickey Rooney as William 'Willie' Miller
- C. Henry Gordon as Tony Berrelli (the Boss)
- Muriel Evans as 'Baby'
- Louise Henry as Lily
- Edward Brophy as Det. Britt
- Henry Armetta as Shuman
- Herman Bing as Jake
- Harold Huber as Dr. Warner

== Production ==
The farm scenes in Hide-Out were filmed over a six-day period at the Hunsucker Ranch in Scotts Valley, California, which was chosen for its resemblance to a typical Connecticut farm.

A 35-member MGM crew traveled 400 miles to Scotts Valley, where they lived and worked on the farm, fully immersing themselves in rural life. The farm’s owner, Thomas Jefferson Hunsucker, then 76 years old, assisted with production by teaching:

- Robert Montgomery how to milk a cow.
- Maureen O’Sullivan how to nurse chickens.
- Mickey Rooney how to care for rabbits.
- Director W. S. Van Dyke how to train barnyard animals to perform on camera.

Some of the more prominent cast and crew, including Robert Montgomery, Maureen O’Sullivan, Elizabeth Patterson, Mickey Rooney, and Wilford Kane, stayed at the Hotel Palomar in Santa Cruz during filming**.

Following the six-day location shoot, production moved to the MGM studio backlot in Hollywood, where a duplicate interior of the Hunsucker farmhouse was built for the remaining scenes.

The Hunsucker Ranch also served as a filming location for two other films:

- Rebecca of Sunnybrook Farm (1917), starring Mary Pickford.
- Way Back Home (1931), starring Seth Parker.
