= Nell O'Day =

American actress (1909–1989)

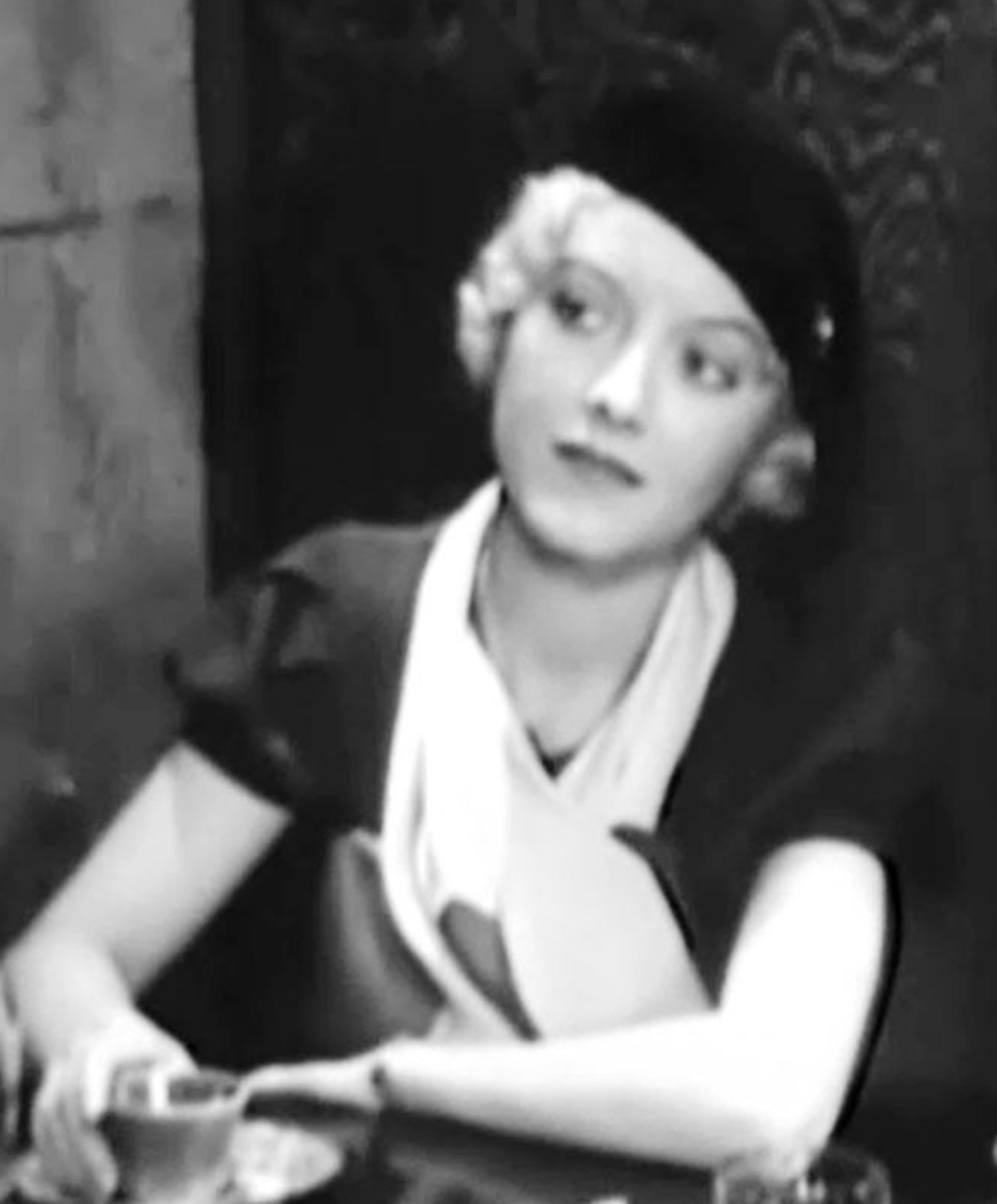
- O'Day in The Road to Ruin (1934)
- Born: September 22, 1909; Prairie Hill, Washington County, Texas, U.S.
- Died: January 5, 1989 (aged 79); Los Angeles, California, U.S.
- Occupation: Actress
- Years active: 1926–1957
- Spouses: Ted Fetter (m. 1935; div. 1941) Larry Williams (m. 1942; div. 1958)

Nell O'Day (September 22, 1909 – January 5, 1989) was an accomplished American equestrian and B-movie actress of the 1930s and 1940s.

== Biography ==
O'Day was born in Prairie Hill, Texas. Her father was an official with a railroad. Her first work as a professional entertainer was as a vaudeville dancer.

She had her first screen roles in the 1920s as a teenager. In 1930, she portrayed Maribelle Fordyce in the Broadway musical Fine and Dandy. Her first starring role was in 1932 when she starred in Rackety Rax opposite Victor McLaglen and Greta Nissan. From 1933 through 1940 she starred in nineteen films, with only a small number of those being western films. Starting in 1941 she began starring in roles placing her as the heroine in westerns, often opposite Johnny Mack Brown, Ray "Crash" Corrigan, Max Terhune, and John 'Dusty' King.

O'Day's other Broadway credits included Many Mansions (1937), One for the Money (1939), and Many Happy Returns (1945).

In 1942 she starred as the heroine in several cliffhanger episodes of Perils of the Royal Mounted. In 1943, under contract with Republic Pictures, she began starring in the Three Mesquiteers film series, alongside Bob Steele, Tom Tyler and Jimmie Dodd. Her last starring western role was in 1943, in the film Boss of Rawhide, opposite Dave O'Brien. She made one more movie, a non-western, in 1946 when she starred in The Story of Kenneth W. Randall M.D., but concentrated mostly on writing screenplays and stage plays.

She spent the rest of her life writing for stage and screen. She died of a heart attack on January 5, 1989, in Los Angeles, California.

== Partial filmography ==
- Twinkletoes (1926) - Ballerina in Teacup (uncredited)
- King of Jazz (1930) - Dancer with Tommy Atkins Sextette
- Rackety Rax (1932) - Doris
- Smoke Lightning (1933) - Dorothy Benson
- This Side of Heaven (1934) - Miss Spence - Maxwell's Secretary (uncredited)
- The Road to Ruin (1934) - Eve Monroe
- Woman in the Dark (1934) - Helen Grant
- Convention Girl (1935) - Daisy Miller
- Boss of Bullion City (1940) - Martha Hadley
- Saturday's Children (1940) - Girl at Party (uncredited)
- Flight Angels (1940) - Sue
- Son of Roaring Dan (1940) - Jane Belden
- Law and Order (1940) - Sally Dixon
- Pony Post (1940) - Norma Reeves
- Back Street (1941) - Elizabeth Saxel
- Double Date (1941) - Mary
- Bury Me Not on the Open Prairie (1941) - Edna Fielding
- Law of the Range (1941) - Mary O'Brien
- Hello, Sucker (1941) - Model
- Rawhide Rangers (1941) - Patti McDowell
- Man from Montana (1941) - Sally Preston
- Sing Another Chorus (1941) - Girl (uncredited)
- Never Give a Sucker an Even Break (1941) - The Salesgirl
- The Masked Rider (1941) - Jean Malone
- Arizona Cyclone (1941) - Claire Randolph
- Fighting Bill Fargo (1941) - Julie Fargo
- Stagecoach Buckaroo (1942) - Molly Denton
- The Mystery of Marie Roget (1942) - Camille
- You're Telling Me (1942) - Girl (uncredited)
- Perils of the Royal Mounted (1942, Serial) - Diana Blake
- There's One Born Every Minute (1942) - Antoinette (uncredited)
- Arizona Stage Coach (1942) - Dorrie Willard
- Pirates of the Prairie (1942) - Helen Spencer
- Thundering Trails (1943) - Edith Walker
- The Return of the Rangers (1943) - Anne Miller
- Boss of Rawhide (1943) - Mary Colby
- The Story of Kenneth W. Randall, M.D. (1946) - Martha Randall
