= Rawhide Rangers =

1941 film by Ray Taylor

- Theatrical release poster
- Directed by: Ray Taylor
- Screenplay by: Ed Earl Repp
- Produced by: Will Cowan
- Starring: Johnny Mack Brown; Fuzzy Knight; Kathryn Adams Doty; Nell O'Day; Riley Hill; Harry Cording
- Cinematography: Charles Van Enger
- Edited by: Paul Landres
- Production company: Universal Pictures
- Distributed by: Universal Pictures
- Release date: July 18, 1941
- Running time: 56 minutes
- Country: United States
- Language: English

Rawhide Rangers is a 1941 American Western film directed by Ray Taylor and written by Ed Earl Repp. The film stars Johnny Mack Brown, Fuzzy Knight, Kathryn Adams Doty, Nell O'Day, Riley Hill and Harry Cording. The film was released on July 18, 1941, by Universal Pictures. In 1949, a loose remake was released called The Pecos Pistol directed by Will Cowan.

== Plot ==
Someone dear to Brand Calhoun was killed, so he decides to get himself kicked from the force and disguise himself as an outlaw. Now he has to infiltrate the gang of outlaws and come up with a plan to find the killer and bring the gang down.

== Cast ==
- Johnny Mack Brown as Brand Calhoun
- Fuzzy Knight as Porky Blake
- Kathryn Adams Doty as Jo Ann Rawlings
- Nell O'Day as Patti McDowell
- Riley Hill as Steve Calhoun
- Harry Cording as Blackie
- Alan Bridge as Rawlings
- Frank Shannon as Captain McDowell
- Ed Cassidy as Alec Martin
- Bob Kortman as Dirk
- Chester Gan as Sing Lo
- James Farley as Banker
