= Aeroneer 1-B =

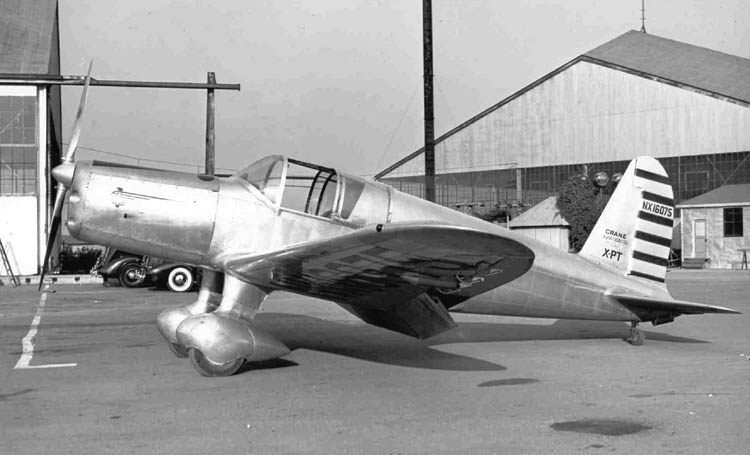

General information
- Type: Two seat sport and training aircraft
- National origin: United States
- Manufacturer: Aero Engineering Corporation

History
- First flight: 1936

The Aeroneer 1-B is an all-metal light aircraft built in the United States in 1936. It did not reach production, despite an attempt to interest the USAAC in it as a trainer, but it appeared in three Hollywood films.

== Design ==
The Aeroneer 1-B was initially developed by the Aero Engineering Corp, which named it. Its later development was taken up by the Phillips Aviation Company, so it appears as the Aeroneer 1-B in contemporary publications, though later sources may refer to it as the Phillips Aeroneer 1-B.

The Aeroneer is a low wing cantilever design. Its wing is in five separate parts: a short span, rectangular centre section, trapezoidal panels over most of the span and rounded tips. The outer panels carry some dihedral. It is built around a single spar placed at 30% chord. Torsional loads are resisted by a torsion box formed by the riveted Alclad skin that covers the whole wing and an auxiliary spar at 65% chord. Its ailerons are metal framed but fabric covered, mounted on piano hinges from the upper surface. Split flaps with an area of 24 sq ft (2.2 m^{2}) run under the trailing edge from aileron to aileron.

The engine is a 125 hp (93 kW) Menasco C-4, an air-cooled, inverted four-cylinder inline, though other 85–150 hp (63–112 kW) Menasco engines could also have been fitted. The fuselage is all-metal, Aclad skinned and stiffened, though immediately behind the engine and around the cockpit the structure is reinforced with chrome-molybdenum steel tubes. The enclosed cockpit, under a sliding canopy and seating two side-by-side with dual controls, is over the wing. The empennage is conventional, with the tailplane set at mid-fuselage; its elevators are balanced and fitted with trim tabs. The fin is straight-edged but the short, broad, balanced rudder is curved.

The Aeroneer has a tailwheel undercarriage. Its mainwheels are on parallel, forward-raked oleo strut legs. The wheels have hydraulic brakes and both they and the legs are faired-in. The tailwheel, also fitted with a shock absorber, is free to caster. Floats or skis can replace wheels.

== Development ==
The date of the Aeroneer's first flight is not known but by February 1937 it had completed "extensive tests" and was "ready for production". Nonetheless, it did not receive its Approved Type Certificate until the summer of 1938.

In the absence of civil orders, Phillips slightly increased the span as well its power, in the hope that USAAC would order it as a basic trainer. A 160 hp (120 kW) Menasco B-6 six-cylinder inline installation was planned, though another six-cylinder, inverted inline, a 145 hp (108 kW) Ranger 6-410, was finally installed.

== Operational history ==
No order was placed and the Aeroneer may have been sold to MGM; it appears in several films including The House Across the Bay (1940), where it took the rôle of the Crane X-PT, Power Dive (1941), and Sky Raiders (1941).

The Aeroneer is reported to have survived in storage in Arizona until at least 2005. In 2007 it was advertised as for sale and its current state is unknown.

== Specifications (Menasco C-4 engine) ==
Data from Jane's All the World's Aircraft 1938

General characteristics

- Crew: One
- Capacity: One passenger
- Length: 24 ft 0 in (7.32 m)
- Wingspan: 32 ft 6 in (9.91 m)
- Height: 7 ft 8 in (2.34 m)
- Wing area: 168 sq ft (15.6 m^{2})
- Empty weight: 1,505 lb (683 kg)
- Gross weight: 2,200 lb (998 kg)
- Fuel capacity: 43 US gal (160 L; 36 imp gal)
- Powerplant: 1 × Menasco C-4 4-cylinder, air-cooled inline, 125 hp (93 kW)

Performance

- Maximum speed: 129 mph (208 km/h, 112 kn)
- Cruise speed: 118 mph (190 km/h, 103 kn)
- Range: 704 mi (1,133 km, 612 nmi)
- Service ceiling: 11,800 ft (3,600 m) service
- Rate of climb: 625 ft/min (3.18 m/s)
- Landing speed: 49 mph (79 km/h; 43 kn)
