= William Douglas Lansford =

American screenwriter

- Born: July 13, 1922 Los Angeles, California, U.S.
- Died: May 22, 2013 (aged 90) Los Angeles, California, U.S.
- Occupation: Author; screenwriter; film producer
- Spouse: Jean Brooks (m. 1946; div. 1956) Ruth Ketcham

William Douglas Lansford (July 13, 1922 – May 22, 2013) was an American author, screenwriter, and film producer.

== Biography ==
Born to a Scots Irish and English father and a Mexican mother, Lansford was raised in an ethnically Mexican neighborhood in East Los Angeles. He had virtually no contact with his father, a Los Angeles policeman until he was 14.

He enlisted in the U.S. Marine Corps in 1940 and served with the 1st Provisional Marine Brigade in Iceland, the 2nd Marine Raider Battalion on Guadalcanal, and Bougainville where he was promoted to sergeant and in the 5th Marine Division on Iwo Jima.

Following the war, Lansford attended college under the G.I. Bill and worked as a reporter for the Los Angeles Daily News.

In 1946, Lansford married actress Jean Brooks; the marriage lasted 10 years. They were divorced in 1956 and Lansford remarried to Ruth Ketcham of Long Island, New York.

During the Korean War he was commissioned as a U.S. Army officer where he became a captain whose duties included being a radio writer with the Armed Forces Radio Service, a Public Information Officer, and a company commander. He was awarded the Bronze Star for his frontline coverage of the battle of Paik Ma San, the first battle in which the ROK army was victorious.

Lansford began writing over 300 short stories and articles for American magazines the Saturday Evening Post, Collier's, Argosy, True, and other Men's adventure magazines, Leatherneck Magazine, Stars and Stripes and many others. He wrote several non-fiction books such as the biographies Stranger than Fiction: The Real Life Adventures of Jack London (1958) and Pancho Villa (1965). The latter was filmed as Villa Rides in 1968 with Lansford doing an early draft of the screenplay.

Lansford wrote many teleplays for American television series such as Four Star Playhouse, Wagon Train, Bonanza, The Rookies, Starsky and Hutch, CHiPs, and Star Trek: The Next Generation. He also wrote the screenplays for made for TV movies depicting Jesse James (The Intruders) and Charles Whitman (The Deadly Tower). He produced, directed, and wrote the film Adios East Los

Lansford also appeared in the documentary series The War.

Lansford died on May 22, 2013, at his Playa del Rey home. The cause was complications of prostate cancer.
