= Girl Time =

- Directed by: Will Cowan
- Produced by: Will Cowan
- Production company: Universal Pictures
- Release date: 1947
- Running time: 15 minutes
- Country: United States
- Language: English

Girl Time is a 1947 American short concert film directed by Will Cowan.

== Cast ==
- Ina Ray Hutton as herself / orchestra leader
- Nellie Lutcher as herself
- Dorothy Costello as herself / dancer (as The Costello Twins)
- Ruth Costello as herself / dancer (as The Costello Twins)
- Lucita as herself
- Tina Ramirez as herself / dancer (as Tina and Coco)
- Coco as herself / dancer (as Tina and Coco)

== Soundtrack ==
- Ina Ray Hutton and her Orchestra – "When My Sugar Walks Down the Street" (Written by Gene Austin, Jimmy McHugh and Irving Mills)
- Lucita – "Hungarian Rhapsody No. 2" (Music by Franz Liszt)
- Ina Ray Hutton and her Orchestra – "Jamaica Rhumba" (Music by Gene de Paul, lyrics by Don Raye)
- Nellie Lutcher – "He's a Real Gone Guy" (Written by Nellie Lutcher)
- Ina Ray Hutton and hHer Orchestra – "Granada" (Music by Agustín Lara)
