= Gangbusters (TV series) =

American TV crime anthology series (1952)

- Created by: Phillips Lord
- Presented by: Phillips Lord

Production
- Producers: William Clothier; William Faris

Original release
- Network: NBC
- Release: March 20 – December 25, 1952

Related
- Gang Busters

Gangbusters is an American crime anthology television series that was broadcast on NBC from March 20, 1952, until December 25, 1952. It was cancelled even though it had the eighth-highest rating of that season's TV shows.

== Format ==
Like the radio program Gang Busters, the TV Gangbusters was created by Phillips Lord. Content of episodes was factually based and included interviews with professionals in law enforcement. Lord narrated the episodes, which used a "semi-documentary style" to dramatize actual cases taken from files of law-enforcement agencies. Viewers saw "the criminal in action, his problems, his psychology, his fears."

At the beginning of each episode, viewers saw a gun pointing at the camera and prisoners in a prison yard, and they heard police sirens and machine guns firing. Each episode ended with the display of a photograph of one of the most-wanted criminals in the United States at that time. Viewers who could provide information about that criminal were asked to contact the FBI, local police, or Gangbusters.

Episodes of Gangbusters included a three-part series about bank robber Willie Sutton.

== Production ==
Gangbusters was filmed and was broadcast on Thursdays from 9 to 9:30 p.m. Eastern Time, alternating weekly with Dragnet. William Clothier and William Faris were the producers. Lord worked closely with the Federal Bureau of Investigation, as the organization provided photographs and data about the criminals that they most wanted to apprehend. Contents of episodes were gathered from sources that included friends and relatives of criminals, members of their gangs, and the perpetrators themselves.

Two feature films were made by re-editing episodes of the series. Myron Healey starred in both: Gang Busters (1955), and Guns Don't Argue (1957).

== Syndication ==
For syndication, in 1954 reruns of Gangbusters were released with the title Captured. Hosted by Chester Morris, that series included 17 episodes from the broadcast series and nine episodes filmed after Gangbusters was taken off the network. The NBC Film Division handled the syndication.

General Teleradio's Film Division bought the "Gangbusters" trademark from Lord, and in the summer of 1954 it began promoting a new first-run series to potential national advertisers. The trade publication Billboard reported in July 1954 that eight episodes had apparently been made and that General Teleradio had acquired four additional unaired episodes from Lord. Lord continued to "handle the production reins" on the new series.

== Cancellation ==
Gangbusters was cancelled to clear the way for Dragnet to be shown every week. Brooks and Marsh wrote in their book The Complete Directory to Prime Time Network and Cable TV Shows 1946-Present, "The reason for the cancellation appears to be that Gangbusters was never intended to be a full-time TV series, but merely a stopgap provided by the sponsor to fill in the weeks when Dragnet wasn't on." The alternate-week schedule provided time to make enough episodes of Dragnet to go weekly. Although Gangbusters had a rating of 42 in the fall of 1952, Dragnet was even more popular. Gangbusters became "probably the highest-rated program ever to be canceled in the history of television."

== Critical response ==
Merrill Panitt wrote in The Philadelphia Inquirer, "Gangbusters is nothing more than an effort to attract an audience by dramatizing murder, robbery, brutality, and other less than commendable acts." He related his view of the show to an editorial in The Journal of the American Medical Association that addressed "the adverse medical and psychological implications" contained in many TV crime dramas." To illustrate his point, Panitt cited one episode of Gangbusters that he felt contained excessive emphasis on violence, while the work of the police "was an extremely minor element in the story."
