= Meet the Chump =

1941 film by Edward F. Cline

- Directed by: Edward F. Cline
- Screenplay by: Alex Gottlieb
- Story by: Hal Hudson; Otis Garrett
- Produced by: Ken Goldsmith
- Starring: Hugh Herbert; Jeanne Kelly; Jean Brooks; Anne Nagel
- Cinematography: Elwood Bredell
- Edited by: Milton Carruth
- Music by: Hans J. Salter
- Production company: Universal Pictures
- Distributed by: Universal Pictures
- Release date: February 14, 1941
- Running time: 60 minutes
- Country: United States
- Language: English

Meet the Chump is a 1941 American comedy film directed by Edward F. Cline and starring Hugh Herbert, Jean Brooks and Anne Nagel. It was produced and distributed by Universal Pictures.

== Plot ==
A man desperately attempts to avoid giving up the ten million dollar trust that he's been administering so well that there's barely any money left.

== Cast ==
- Hugh Herbert as Hugh Mansfield
- Lewis Howard as John Francis Mansfield III
- Jean Brooks as Madge Reilly
- Anne Nagel as Miss Burke
- Kathryn Adams as Gloria Mitchell
- Shemp Howard as Stinky Fink
- Richard Lane as Slugs Bennett
- Andrew Tombes as Revello
- Hobart Cavanaugh as Juniper
- Charles Halton as Dr. Stephanowsky
- Martin Spellman as Champ
- Edward Gargan as Muldoon

== Bibliography ==
- Fetrow, Alan G. Feature Films, 1940-1949: a United States Filmography. McFarland, 1994.
