= Way Back Home (1931 film) =

1931 film directed by William A. Seiter

- Theatrical release poster
- Directed by: William A. Seiter
- Written by: Jane Murfin
- Produced by: William LeBaron
- Starring: Phillips Lord; Effie Palmer; Frank Albertson; Bette Davis
- Cinematography: J. Roy Hunt
- Edited by: Arthur Roberts
- Music by: Max Steiner
- Production company: RKO Radio Pictures
- Distributed by: RKO Radio Pictures
- Release date: November 13, 1931
- Running time: 81 minutes
- Country: United States
- Language: English
- Budget: $400,000

Way Back Home is a 1931 American pre-Code drama film directed by William A. Seiter and starring Phillips Lord, Effie Palmer, Frank Albertson and Bette Davis. The screenplay was written by Jane Murfin based on characters created by Lord for the NBC Radio show Seth Parker.

== Plot ==
A decade earlier, Jonesport, Maine preacher Seth Parker and his wife assumed care of motherless infant Robbie Turner after he was abandoned by his sadistic alcoholic father Rufe. Young Robbie has always considered the Parkers to be his parents. Mary Lucy Duffy, whose father has banished her from their home for fraternizing with farmhand David Clark, is also living with the Parkers, and her romance with David attracts the attention of the local gossips. David's mother had disappeared with a stranger years earlier, and when she returned to Jonesport with an illegitimate infant son, they were shunned by the townspeople.

Mary Lucy and David plan to elope to Bangor, but Seth encourages them to stay by offering to pay for a proper wedding. Rufe forces entry into the Parker home to kidnap Robbie, attacking Mary Lucy when she tries to protect the boy. Seth pursues Rufe and Robbie and intercepts them before they board a train. Because Seth is not Robbie's legal guardian, the boy is placed in an orphanage until a decision can be made about his future. Meanwhile, Seth lectures the townspeople about tolerance and implores them to accept Rose and her newlywed son and his bride. Robbie returns to Jonesport, having been legally entrusted to the Parkers' care.

== Cast ==
- Phillips Lord as Seth Parker
- Effie Palmer as Mother Parker
- Frank Albertson as David Clark
- Bette Davis as Mary Lucy Duffy
- Frankie Darro as Robbie
- Dorothy Peterson as Rose Clark
- Stanley Fields as Rufe Turner
- Oscar Apfel as Wobbling Duffy
- Bennett Kilpack as Cephus

== Production ==
Phillips Lord had created the character of preacher and folksy philosopher Seth Parker for a Sunday night series broadcast by NBC Radio. Its popularity led RKO Radio Pictures to purchase the film rights and assign Jane Murfin to write a screenplay with Parker and his wife as the central characters. Originally entitled Other People's Business, it drew criticism from a studio script reader who felt that the plot was outdated and noted: "A story of this type should never take itself seriously, for the day when pictures like The Old Homestead [a 1915 Famous Players film focused on a popular New England vaudevillian] would grip the attention of a movie audience is lost forever." The reader cited the commercial failure of Check and Double Check, a 1930 feature based on Amos 'n' Andy, as proof that radio shows did not adapt well for the screen, and noted that most Seth Parker listeners were "those people who are interested in the singing of hymns, old folk songs, and a very simple brand of humor" and that the "average young person, between the ages of fifteen and thirty, who form a very large percentage of the movie audiences, do not listen to the broadcast." However, RKO supervising producer Pandro S. Berman greenlighted the project and budgeted it at $400,000.

Berman negotiated with Universal Pictures for the loan of Bette Davis, whose contract with the studio had been recently renewed following her completion of Waterloo Bridge, and Carl Laemmle, Jr. agreed to loan her for a fee of $300 per week. Davis was pleased with the attention paid to her by cinematographer J. Roy Hunt. She later recalled: "I was truly overjoyed. Plus the part I played was an important one—and a charming one. It gave me some confidence in myself for the first time since leaving the theater in New York."

The film was shot on location in Santa Cruz, California because of the small town's New England-like atmosphere. Much of the rural farm setting was filmed at the Hunsucker Ranch in Scotts Valley, a well-known filming location at the time. The ranch was also used as a filming location for Rebecca of Sunnybrook Farm (1917) and Hide-Out (1934).

== Reception ==
Andre Sennwald of The New York Times observed: "Seth Parker, the radio sage, is shedding a rather appealing sweetness and light ... in his first motion picture ... [His] following will not be disappointed and those who do not know the character will find a gentle and frequently moving entertainment." In later years, Bette Davis commented: "I'm glad Sennwald felt about it as he did. He obviously accepted it for what it was meant to be—not a masterpiece, just a slice of Yankee village life."

Variety wrote: "As entertainment the film is unbelievably bad. The story is strictly an old-style proposed tearjerker. It runs 81 minutes which seem like 181."

Motion Picture Herald reviewed the film as Other People's Business, the title under which it was released in Great Britain, although domestically it was changed to Way Back Home when Phillips Lord published his book Seth Parker & His Jonesport Folks: Way Back Home to coincide with the release of the film.

== Preservation ==
- A print is housed in the Library of Congress collection. Warner Bros., which owns the RKO library, has preserved the film, which airs occasionally on Turner Classic Movies.
