= Bury Me Not on the Lone Prairie (film) =

1941 film

- Theatrical release poster
- Directed by: Ray Taylor
- Screenplay by: Sherman L. Lowe; Victor McLeod
- Story by: Sherman L. Lowe
- Produced by: Will Cowan
- Starring: Johnny Mack Brown; Fuzzy Knight; Nell O'Day; Kathryn Adams Doty; Harry Cording; Ernie Adams
- Cinematography: Jerome Ash
- Edited by: Charles Maynard
- Production company: Universal Pictures
- Distributed by: Universal Pictures
- Release date: March 21, 1941
- Running time: 61 minutes
- Country: United States
- Language: English

Bury Me Not on the Lone Prairie is a 1941 American Western film directed by Ray Taylor and written by Sherman L. Lowe and Victor McLeod. The film stars Johnny Mack Brown, Fuzzy Knight, Nell O'Day, Kathryn Adams Doty, Harry Cording and Ernie Adams. The film was released on March 21, 1941, by Universal Pictures.

== Cast ==
- Johnny Mack Brown as Joe Henderson
- Fuzzy Knight as Lem Fielding
- Nell O'Day as Edna Fielding
- Kathryn Adams Doty as Dorothy Walker
- Harry Cording as J. L. Red Clinton
- Ernie Adams as Mustang
- Ed Cassidy as Sheriff
- Don House as Bob Henderson
- Pat J. O'Brien as Bill Salters
- Lee Shumway as Andy Walker
- Jim Corey as Barney
- Frank O'Connor as Dan Wendall
- William Desmond as Bartender
- Bud Osborne as Calvert
- Jimmy Wakely as Jimmy Wakely
