= The Pecos Pistol =

- Theatrical release poster
- Directed by: Will Cowan
- Written by: Ed Earl Repp
- Produced by: Will Cowan
- Starring: Tex Williams, Smokey Rogers, Barbara Payton
- Cinematography: Charles Van Enger
- Edited by: Ted J. Kent
- Music by: Milton Schwarzwald, Hans J. Salter
- Production company: Universal Pictures
- Distributed by: Universal Pictures
- Release date: 27 October 1949
- Running time: 26 minutes
- Country: United States
- Language: English

The Pecos Pistol is a short 1949 American Western film directed by Will Cowan and starring Tex Williams, Smokey Rogers, and Barbara Payton. This is a black-and-white film, a partial remake of 1941's Rawhide Rangers by Ray Taylor.

== Plot ==
Someone dear to Tex Williams was killed, so he decides to get himself kicked from the force and disguise himself as an outlaw. Now, he has to infiltrate the gang of outlaws and come up with a plan to find the killer and bring the gang down.

== Cast ==
- Tex Williams as Tex Williams
- Smokey Rogers as Smokey
- Deuce Spriggins as Deuce
- Barbara Payton as Kay McCormick
- Bill Cassady as Ben Williams
- Forrest Taylor as Capt. McCormick
- Terry Frost as Parker
- George Lloyd as Rocky
- Monte Montague as Harris
