= The Big Beat (film) =

1958 American musical comedy film

- Theatrical release poster
- Directed by: Will Cowan
- Written by: David P. Harmon
- Produced by: Will Cowan
- Starring: William Reynolds; Andra Martin; Gogi Grant; Jeffrey Stone
- Cinematography: Irving Glassberg
- Edited by: Edward Curtiss
- Music by: Henry Mancini
- Production company: Universal Pictures
- Distributed by: Universal International
- Release date: February 1958
- Running time: 82 minutes
- Country: United States
- Language: English

The Big Beat is a 1958 American musical comedy film distributed by Universal International, which was directed and produced by Will Cowan, written by David P. Harmon, and starred William Reynolds, Andra Martin, Gogi Grant, and Jeffrey Stone. It was shot in Eastmancolor, by Pathe, and was released on May 24, 1958, as a double bill with Summer Love. The story is about a young man fresh out of college named John Randall who tries to persuade his father, a record company owner, to start signing up rock 'n' roll acts.

This film is well known to have featured many famous and popular singers, musicians, and musical groups of the 1950s, including Charlie Barnet, Buddy Bregman, Alan Copeland, The Del-Vikings, and Jeri Southern.

== Plot ==
In New York, Joseph Randall (Bill Goodwin), the owner of Randall Records, names his son John (William Reynolds) as the company's new vice-president, to the pleasure of A&R man Danny Phillips (Jeffrey Stone). John immediately urges his father to eschew the company's middle-of-the-road love ballads in favor of newer musical genres, such as rock and roll, calypso or rhythm and blues, but Joseph refuses to deviate from the standards. For this reason, Danny's girlfriend, celebrated singer Cindy Adams (Gogi Grant), has decided not to sign a contract with Randall Records.

John admires his new office and young secretary, singer Nikki Collins (Andra Martin), who is impressed by his persistence in pitching a more up-to-date record label to his father. At the end of John's first day, Danny is, as usual, too busy working to take Cindy out to dinner, and so encourages John to take his place. John and Cindy go to a nightclub to see George Shearing & the Quintet perform, and there Cindy admits that she is eager to marry Danny, who maintains an emotional distance while he builds his career. John then accompanies Cindy to her television show and, after watching her sing, enthusiastically offers the band, a beatnik rock combo called the Preston Trio, an audition at his office.

The next day, however, Joseph refuses to record the group, and in frustration John turns to the sympathetic Nikki. She brings him to her apartment, where her neighbors, the Lancer family, May Gordon (Rose Marie), and sculptor Vladimir Skolsky (Hans Conried), entertain him with an impromptu show. Days later, before leaving for an eight-week trip to Europe, Joseph announces that he is incorporating a new company, Revue Records, as a test label for John. He gives half-ownership to John and forty percent to Danny, who is moved by the gesture. Over the next few weeks, Danny tries to groom John and teach him how to market his songs, but John is impatient and signs acts recklessly. At a launch party for the label, John is consumed with new ideas and research about the record business, prompting Nikki to use all her wiles to engage him in a kiss. Meanwhile, Cindy tells Danny that she no longer wants to perform, preferring the prospect of marriage, and he promises that if Revue is successful, they will wed. With that in mind, when John and Nikki urge Cindy to record a song for Revue, she agrees, hoping to spur on the label's success.

Eight weeks later, however, the label is floundering, due to the huge, unsold backlog of records that John has produced. When Joseph returns, he is furious, warning John to sell the records or relinquish his share of the company. John, devastated that he has disappointed his father, goes to Nikki's to commiserate, but they are interrupted by Vlad, who insists on hearing about their dilemma. Although Nikki urges Vlad to leave, John seems inspired by his visit, and the next day gathers all his old textbooks in the certainty that there is valuable information somewhere in them. By nighttime, John has realized, from a photo in his economics books, that Vlad is in reality supermarket mogul B. J. Carson.

Upon confronting Vlad, the executive drops his phony accent and admits that for six months of every year he lives a quiet life in disguise. The next day, John calls a meeting of Joseph, Danny, Nikki, Cindy, and the department heads. When Vlad enters, everyone is shocked, especially Nikki, who suspects the sculptor is tricking them. He explains, however, that John has convinced him to buy the back stock of records for sale in his supermarket chain. After Vlad orders thousands of albums per month, Danny turns to Cindy with a marriage proposal and Joseph exults that he trusted John all along. To prove his conversion, when the Preston Trio visits, Joseph boasts that he "digs them from down under to the polar cap."

== Cast ==
- William Reynolds as John Randall
- Andra Martin as Nikki Collins
- Gogi Grant as Cindy Adams
- Jeffrey Stone as Danny Phillips
- Rose Marie as May Gordon
- Hans Conried as Vladimir Skilsky (AKA B. J. Carson)
- Bill Goodwin as Joseph Randall
- Howard Miller as himself
- Jack Straw as Chick
- Phil Harvey as Director
- Ingrid Goude as Secretary
- Steve Drexel as the Piano Player
- Ethmer Roten as the Flute Musician (uncredited)

As stated during the opening credits, "the following artists were chosen for this picture because you.. the public... have acclaimed their talent by purchasing four hundred million of the records":

- Charlie Barnet
- Buddy Bregman
- Alan Copeland
- The Del-Vikings
- The Diamonds
- Fats Domino
- The Four Aces
- Harry James
- The Lancers
- Freddy Martin
- The Mills Brothers
- Russ Morgan
- George Shearing & the Quintet
- Jeri Southern
- The Bill Thompson Singers
- The Cal Tjader Quintent

== Home media ==
Universal has not officially released The Big Beat on DVD or VHS. A few bootleg DVD-R copies of varying quality exist but otherwise, not much else is known.

== See also ==
- List of American films of 1958
