= The Chaser (1938 film) =

1938 film by Edwin L. Marin

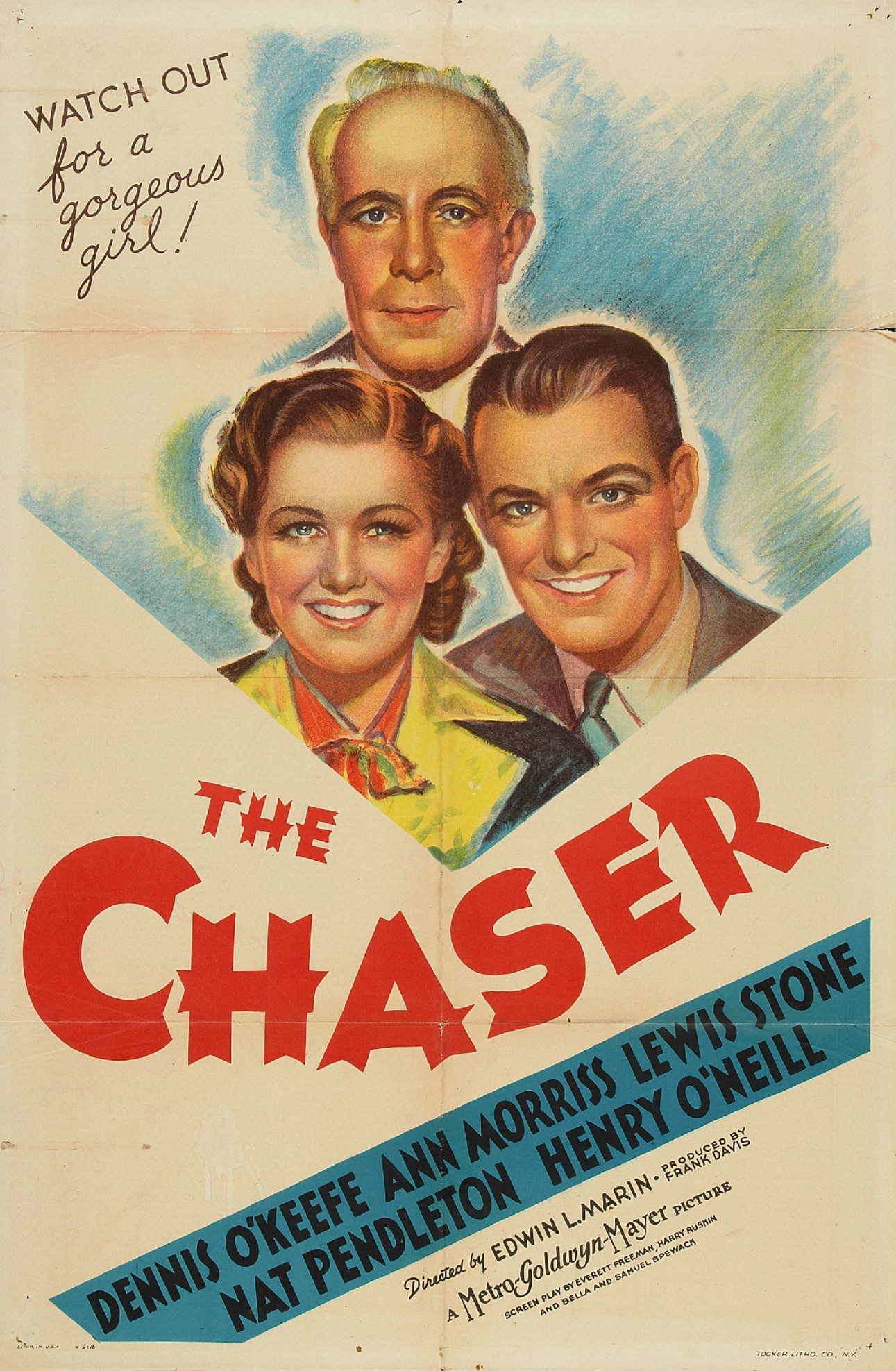
- Theatrical release poster
- Directed by: Edwin L. Marin
- Written by: Everett Freeman; Harry Ruskin; Bella Spewack; Samuel Spewack
- Produced by: Frank Davis
- Starring: Dennis O'Keefe; Lewis Stone
- Cinematography: Charles Lawton Jr.
- Edited by: George Boemler
- Music by: Edward Ward
- Distributed by: Metro-Goldwyn-Mayer
- Release date: 1938
- Running time: 73 minutes
- Country: United States
- Language: English
- Budget: $161,000
- Box office: $332,000

The Chaser is a 1938 American comedy drama film directed by Edwin L. Marin and starring Dennis O'Keefe and Lewis Stone.

== Plot ==
An ambulance chaser, unethical and disliked by many, attorney Thomas Z. Brandon chases cases in the street, offering to represent clients on trumped-up charges.

A street-car company's owner, Calhoun, resents this practice and hires Dorothy Mason to go undercover to gain evidence against the attorney, pretending to be an accident victim. She sees how a doctor, Prescott, manipulates a client into memorizing certain false information to use in court.

Dorothy learns that Thomas has a good explanation why he's doing this and that Calhoun is actually unscrupulous himself. She perjures herself in court, and Thomas spurns her after learning of her deceit, but ultimately they fall in love and Thomas promises to act more ethically from now on.

== Cast ==
- Dennis O'Keefe as Thomas Z. Brandon
- Ann Morriss as Dorothy Mason
- Lewis Stone as Dr. Prescott
- Nat Pendleton as "Floppy" Phil
- Henry O'Neill as Calhoun
- Ruth Gillette as Mrs. Olson
- John Qualen as Lars
- Robert Emmett Keane as Simon Kelly
- Jack Mulhall as Joe
- Irving Bacon as Harvey
- Pierre Watkin as Mr. Beaumont

== Reception ==
According to MGM records the movie earned $220,000 in the US and Canada and $102,000 elsewhere, making a $27,000 profit. Profits might have been greater, but Lewis Stone's association with his Judge Hardy MGM roles proved to be a drawback: "there were so many complaints from the ticket buyers about the fine old judge degrading himself that the studio had to yank the film from circulation at a cost of maybe $150,000 in profits."
