= Son of Roaring Dan =

- Theatrical release poster
- Directed by: Ford Beebe
- Screenplay by: Clarence Upson Young
- Produced by: Joseph Gershenson
- Starring: Johnny Mack Brown; Fuzzy Knight; Nell O'Day; Jean Brooks; Robert Homans; Tom Chatterton
- Cinematography: William A. Sickner
- Edited by: Paul Landres
- Production company: Universal Pictures
- Distributed by: Universal Pictures
- Release date: July 26, 1940
- Running time: 63 minutes
- Country: United States
- Language: English

Son of Roaring Dan is a 1940 American Western film directed by Ford Beebe and written by Clarence Upson Young. The film stars Johnny Mack Brown, Fuzzy Knight, Nell O'Day, Jean Brooks, Robert Homans and Tom Chatterton. The film was released on July 26, 1940, by Universal Pictures.

== Cast ==
- Johnny Mack Brown as Jim Reardon
- Fuzzy Knight as Tick Belden
- Nell O'Day as Jane Belden
- Jean Brooks as Eris Brooks
- Robert Homans as Roaring Dan McPhail
- Tom Chatterton as Stuart Manning
- John Eldredge as Thorndyke
- Ethan Laidlaw as Matt Gregg
- Lafe McKee as Frank Brooks
- Richard Alexander as Big Taylor
- Eddie Polo as Charlie Gregg
- John Beach as Steve
- Jack Shannon as Tom
