= The Crime of Dr. Crespi =

1935 film by John H. Auer

- Theatrical release poster
- Directed by: John H. Auer
- Screenplay by: Lewis Graham; Edward Olmstead; John H. Auer
- Based on: The Premature Burial by Edgar Allan Poe
- Produced by: John H. Auer; Herb Hayman
- Starring: Erich von Stroheim; Dwight Frye; John Bohn; Jeanne Kelly; Paul Guilfoyle; Harriet Russell
- Cinematography: Larry Williams
- Edited by: Leonard Wheeler
- Music by: Milton Schwarzwald (uncredited)
- Production company: Liberty Pictures
- Distributed by: Republic Pictures (US); British Lion Films (UK)
- Release date: September 24, 1935
- Running time: 63 minutes
- Country: United States
- Language: English

The Crime of Dr. Crespi is a 1935 American horror film starring Erich von Stroheim, Paul Guilfoyle, Jeanne Kelly, Dwight Frye, Harriet Russell, and John Bohn. It was released by Republic Pictures.

The movie was filmed at Biograph Studios in The Bronx, New York and is loosely based on the Edgar Allan Poe short story, "The Premature Burial".

== Plot ==
Dr. Andre Crespi (von Stroheim) hates Dr. Stephen Ross (Bohn), who married Crespi's girlfriend, Estelle (Harriet Russell). During surgery, Ross appears to die. Crespi has given Ross a drug that induces a state of apparent death, while Ross retains all of his senses. Dr. John Arnold (Guilfoyle) is then asked to exhume Ross by the suspicious Dr. Thomas (Frye). They exhume the body and return to the hospital to prove he was poisoned. Ross awakens from the drug while on the autopsy table.

== Cast ==
- Erich von Stroheim — Dr. Andre Crespi
- Harriet Russell — Estelle Gorham Ross
- Dwight Frye — Dr. Thomas
- Paul Guilfoyle — Dr. John Arnold
- John Bohn (stage name of Charles Frederick Herendeen) as Dr. Stephen Ross
- Geraldine Kay as Miss Rexford
- Jean Brooks as Miss Gordon
- Patsy Berlin as Jeanne Ross
- Joe Verdi as Di Angelo
- Dean Raymond as Minister

== Reception ==
In their 1936 review of the film, The New York Times gave the film a negative review, calling it "an almost humorously overstrained attempt at grimness". The reviewer criticized Stroheim as being "unconvincing", and uninspired cinematography; stating that Frye's performance was the film's only redeeming presence.

== See also ==
- List of horror films of the 1930s
