= Helen Sioussat =

American network executive

- Born: Helen Johnson Doyle Sioussat; February 11, 1902
- Died: December 2, 1995 (aged 93)
- Education: Goucher College
- Occupation: Broadcasting executive

Helen Johnson Doyle Sioussat (February 11, 1902 – December 2, 1995) was a network executive in the early days of American television, serving as the director of talks and public affairs at CBS radio from 1937 to 1958. She created and hosted the first roundtable discussion program on television.

== Early years ==
Helen Sioussat was the daughter of Maurice Joseph Talleyrand Sioussat Born in Baltimore, she was orphaned at the age of seven and raised by her aunt. She graduated from Western High School and Goucher College and then pursued a varied career in business, holding roles such as secretary, dental assistant, business manager, and assistant treasurer. She also had a brief career as a professional dancer, lasting about a year.

== Broadcasting career ==
Sioussat entered the broadcasting industry as an assistant to Phillips Lord, a renowned radio producer. Despite being one of approximately 200 applicants, she candidly admitted to having no experience or knowledge of radio and not even owning a radio receiver. When Lord offered her a starting salary of $50 per week, she negotiated for more, arguing that her lack of experience would make the job more challenging. By the time she reached home, Lord had called back with a revised offer of $65 per week. Initially, she managed Lord's Washington office, gathering official information for his G-Men program. After that program was canceled, she was transferred to New York and took charge of all Lord's programs, including Gang Busters, Mr. District Attorney, and Seth Parker. Her responsibilities expanded to include selecting cast members, directed rehearsals, and writing and revising scripts.

In 1936, Edward R. Murrow, director of talks at CBS hired Sioussat to be his assistant. The following year, she replaced Murrow when he left that post to go to London. After a simultaneous realignment of duties at the network, she became responsible for all CBS non-commercial public affairs programs. Sioussat helped to formulate policies under the new setup, including fairness in granting air time to those who sought it. Her duties also included editing Talks, a quarterly digest published by CBS. Acceptance did not come easily in the male-dominated atmosphere that existed then. A vice president refused to authorize letterhead and business cards showing her as department head until the CBS legal department overruled him. When a male assistant was hired, he began the job at a higher salary than hers. She received raises later, but that initial discrepancy rankled her.

Table Talk with Helen Sioussat was "the first question–and-answer discussion program on CBS." It was broadcast from a CBS-TV studio in Grand Central Station in 1941-1943 on experimental station W2XAB, and its format worked well enough that it was essentially copied in later talk programs.

== Other professional activities ==
Sioussat was a co-founder of American Women in Radio and Television, an organization to support female workers in media. She also wrote the book Mikes Don't Bite and wrote both the music and the lyrics for four songs.

== Personal life ==
Sioussat was married twice and divorced twice by 1934. A feature article in The Baltimore Sun in 1953 described her as "an Elsa Maxwell type party-giver and party-goer".

== Papers ==
Helen Sioussat papers are housed in the Library of American Broadcasting at the University of Maryland libraries. Donated in 1995, the collection includes citations, correspondence, financial records, manuscripts, photographs, press releases, transcripts, and other items.
