= Guns Don't Argue =

- Film poster
- Directed by: Bill Karn & Richard Kahn
- Screenplay by: William Faris; Phillips Lord
- Produced by: William Faris
- Starring: Myron Healey; Jean Harvey; Paul Dubov; Sam Edwards; Richard Crane; Lash LaRue
- Cinematography: Clark Ramsey
- Edited by: Robert T. Spar
- Music by: Paul Dunlap
- Production company: Visual Drama Inc.
- Release date: December 1, 1957 (United States)
- Running time: 92 minutes
- Country: United States
- Language: English

Guns Don't Argue is a 1957 low-budget feature film about the early achievements of the FBI in defeating the most notorious criminals of the 1930s. The film involves dramatizations of the crimes and the eventual demise of various gangsters, told with a moralistic narrative.

== Plot ==
The film takes the form of a docudrama in which actors who are cast as FBI special agents speak to camera about the war on gangsters in the 1920s and 1930s. Using contacts with gun molls, agents hunt criminals. The film dramatizes the crime careers and final capture or deaths of John Dillinger, the Barker Gang (Ma Barker, Fred Barker, Arthur Barker, Alvin Karpis), Bonnie and Clyde, Homer Van Meter, Doc Barker and Pretty-Boy Floyd.

== Cast ==
- Jim Davis as Texas Ranger Captain Stewart/Narrator
- Lyle Talbot as Dr. William Guellfe, plastic surgeon
- Lash LaRue as 'Doc' Barker
- Richard Crane as Homer Van Meter
- Myron Healey as John Dillinger
- Ann Morriss as Mildred Jaunce, The Lady in Red
- Sam Edwards as Fred Barker
- Paul Dubov as Alvin Karpis
- Baynes Barron as Clyde Barrow
- Tamar Cooper as Bonnie Parker
- Regina Gleason as Hope
- Knobby Schaeffer as Adam Richetti
- Jeanne Carmen as Paula
- Aline Towne as Shirley, girl with Karpis
- Doug Wilson as 'Pretty Boy' Floyd
- Robert Kendall as Baby Face Nelson
- Jean Harvey as 'Ma' Barker
- Ralph Moody as Arthur 'Pa' Barker
- Coulter Irwin as FBI Agent Ross Baxter
- Jeanne Bates as Mrs. Ross Baxter
- Sydney Mason as Lieutenant Bill Baxter
- Bill Baldwin Sr as Special Agent Fenton/Narrator
- Captain Frank Hamer as Texas Ranger
- Sam Flint as FBI Chief
- Florence Lake as Bessie, the landlady
- Russ Whitney as Verne Miller
- Helen Van Tuyl as Texas Lady Governor
- Hank Patterson as Scully Wass (Farmer)
- Robert Bice as FBI Agent Tyler
- Percy Helton as pool room proprietor
- Scott Douglas as FBI Agent Clifton
- William Boyett as FBI Agent on pier
- Ray Boyle as Raymond Hamilton
- Texas Joe Foster as Tony Milento
- Joseph J. Greene as Arthur Troser
- Darlene Fields as Connie, Dillinger's girl
- Dick Foote as prison trusty
- Billy Griffith as Bucher
- Robert Vanselow as John Hamilton
- Glenn Holden as Dillinger's jail guard
- Harold 'Tommy" Hart as garage man
- Smoki Whitfield as the bootblack

== Production ==
Guns Don't Argue consists of footage compiled from three episodes of the 1952 television series Gangbusters, which was based on the Gang Busters radio program. The franchise was the source of the Gang Busters serial film in 1942 starring Kent Taylor and Gang Busters in 1955, which was also composed of excerpts from the television series.

The film is a revisionist docudrama, portraying the war on gangsters from the 1920s and 1930s from an FBI point of view. Most notable is the portrayal of the deaths of Bonnie and Clyde and John Dillinger. The scenes show each firing the first shot and having ample time to surrender, when in fact they were shot in ambushes by police and federal agents. Another inaccuracy is the misidentification of FBI agent Raymond J. Caffrey, who was killed in the Kansas City massacre of 1933, and the false assertion that it had been his first day with the FBI.

== Reception ==
In a contemporary review, The Springfield Union called the film's depiction of crime a "better-than-average job" but noted that the acting occasionally elicited unintended laughter from some audience members.

The film is greatly admired by Martin Scorsese, who has said: "It's an amazing film. It's to be studied, because it shows you how to make a film on a low budget."

== See also ==
- List of American films of 1957
