= Riders of Death Valley =

1941 film by Ford Beebe, Ray Taylor

- Directed by: Ford Beebe; Ray Taylor
- Written by: Basil Dickey; Oliver Drake; Sherman L. Lowe; Jack O'Donnell; George H. Plympton
- Produced by: Henry MacRae
- Starring: Dick Foran; Leo Carrillo; Buck Jones; Charles Bickford; Guinn "Big Boy" Williams; Lon Chaney Jr. Noah Beery Jr.
- Cinematography: Jerome Ash; William A. Sickner
- Edited by: Saul A. Goodkind (supervisor); Joseph Gluck; Louis Sackin; Alvin Todd
- Music by: Charles Previn
- Distributed by: Universal Pictures
- Release date: July 1, 1941
- Running time: 15 chapters (283 minutes)
- Country: United States
- Language: English

Riders of Death Valley is a 1941 American Western film serial from Universal Pictures. It was a high budget serial with an all-star cast led by Dick Foran and Buck Jones. Ford Beebe and Ray Taylor directed. It also features Lon Chaney Jr. in a supporting role as a villainous henchman as well as Noah Beery Jr., Charles Bickford, Guinn "Big Boy" Williams, Monte Blue, Roy Barcroft, Richard Alexander and Glenn Strange.

== Plot ==
The villainous Wolf Reade and his gang set out to discover the location of a lost mine and lay claim to it.

== Cast ==
- Dick Foran as Jim Benton, vigilante hero
- Leo Carrillo as Pancho Lopez
- Buck Jones as Tombstone
- Charles Bickford as Wolf Reade, villain hired by Kirby and Davis
- Guinn "Big Boy" Williams as Borax Bill
- Lon Chaney Jr. as Butch, one of Reade's henchmen
- Noah Beery Jr. as Smokey
- Jean Brooks as Mary Morgan
- James Blaine as Joseph Kirby, one of the mastermind villains
- Monte Blue as Rance Davis, the other mastermind villain
- Glenn Strange as Tex, a Benton Rider
- Roy Barcroft as Dirk, one of Reade's henchmen
- Jack Rockwell as Trigger, one of Reade's henchmen
- Ethan Laidlaw as Rusty, one of Reade's henchmen
- Richard Alexander as Pete Grump, one of Reade's henchmen

== Production ==
Riders of Death Valley was Universal's "all-star, high-budget western cliffhanger." It provided a lot of stock footage for later serials.

=== Stunts ===
- Jack Casey
- Leroy Johnson
- Gil Perkins
- Ken Terrell doubling George J. Lewis
- Duke York

== Chapter titles ==
1. Death Marks the Trail
2. The Menacing Herd
3. The Plunge of Peril
4. Flaming Fury
5. The Avalanche of Doom
6. Blood and Gold
7. Death Rides the Storm
8. Descending Doom
9. Death Holds the Reins
10. Devouring Flames
11. The Fatal Blast
12. Thundering Doom
13. Bridge of Disaster
14. A Fight to the Death
15. The Harvest of Hate

_{Source:}

== See also ==
- List of film serials
- List of film serials by studio

Preceded by Sky Raiders (1941)	Universal Serial; Riders of Death Valley (1941)	Succeeded by Sea Raiders (1941)
