= Rackety Rax =

1932 film

- Directed by: Alfred L. Werker
- Written by: Joel Sayre; Lou Breslow; Ben Markson; William M. Conselman; Bradley King; Murray Roth
- Starring: Victor McLaglen; Greta Nissen; Nell O'Day
- Cinematography: L. William O'Connell
- Edited by: Robert Bischoff
- Music by: Arthur Lange
- Production company: Fox Film Corporation
- Distributed by: Fox Film Corporation
- Release date: October 23, 1932
- Running time: 70 minutes
- Country: United States
- Language: English

Rackety Rax is a 1932 American pre-Code comedy action film directed by Alfred L. Werker and starring Victor McLaglen, Greta Nissen and Nell O'Day.

== Plot ==
Always looking for an angle, "Knucks" McGloin purchases the mortgage on Canarsie College and then turns its football team's fortunes around by hiring thugs and hooligans as players and nightclub dancers as cheerleaders.

For the biggest game of the season, almost everything goes wrong. Canarsie's quarterback double-crosses his teammates and coach Brick Gilligan (a former Sing Sing inmate) by revealing the team's plays to the opponents. Guns are drawn on both sides, a bomb is tossed into the middle of a huddle and explosions destroy the cars belonging to both of the teams' owners as soon as the game ends.

== Cast ==
- Victor McLaglen as 'Knucks' McGloin
- Greta Nissen as Voine
- Nell O'Day as Doris
- Alan Dinehart as Counsellor Sultsfeldt
- Stanley Fields as Gilatti
- Marjorie Beebe as Mrs. McGloin
- Vince Barnett as 'Dutch'
- Ward Bond as 'Brick' Gilligan
- Allen Jenkins as Mike Dumphy
- Esther Howard as 'Sister' Carrie
- Ivan Linow as Tossilitis
- Eric Mayne as Dr. Vanderveer
- John Keyes as McGloin's Bodyguard
- Joe Brown as McGloin's Bodyguard
- Arthur Pierson as 'Speed' Bennett

== See also ==
- List of American football films

== Bibliography ==
- Aubrey Solomon. The Fox Film Corporation, 1915–1935: A History and Filmography. McFarland, 2011.
