= Power Dive =

1941 film by James P. Hogan

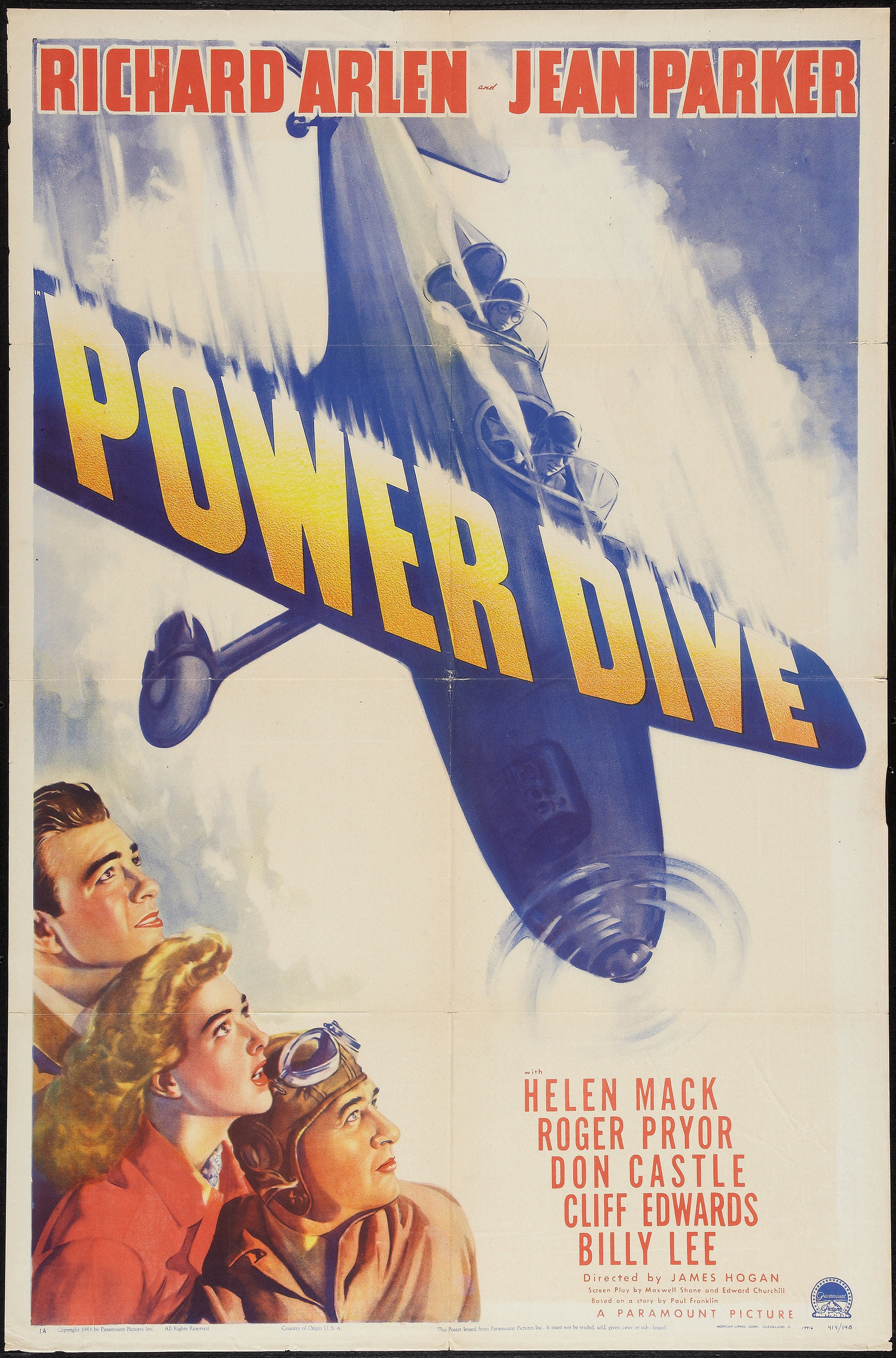
- Poster from 1941
- Directed by: James P. Hogan
- Written by: Edward Churchill; Maxwell Shane
- Based on: story by Paul Franklin
- Produced by: William H. Pine; William C. Thomas
- Starring: Richard Arlen; Jean Parker; Helen Mack
- Cinematography: John Alton
- Edited by: Robert O. Crandall
- Music by: C. Bakaleinikoff
- Production company: Picture Corporation of America
- Distributed by: Paramount Pictures, Inc.
- Release date: May 28, 1941
- Running time: 68 minutes
- Country: United States
- Language: English
- Budget: $86,000
- Box office: $1 million

Power Dive is a 1941 American film directed by James P. Hogan. The film stars Richard Arlen, Jean Parker and Helen Mack.

Power Dive was the first film from the producing team of Pine-Thomas Productions, former press agents who had a producing unit at Paramount.

== Plot ==
Power Dive (1941)

Ace test pilot Bradley Farrell, flying for McMasters Aviation Corp., breaks his leg when an overweight prototype crashes. Brad's younger brother Douglas, a recent graduate in aeronautical engineering, thinks Doug's flying is too dangerous and is hired as a design engineer at McMasters. Carol Blake wants to interest Brad in her father's design for an aircraft made of plastic. Doug pretends to be Brad because he is attracted to her but Brad meets Carol and takes her out flying. She introduces him to her blind father, Professor Blake, resulting in Brad becoming immersed in the professor's new designs.

Brad's friend, Johnny Coles, loses his life test flying his own, similar design, that breaks apart in the air, leaving behind his wife and child. Despite his friend's death, Brad convinces the company to build Blake's "geodetic" aircraft design, with his brother put in charge of the project.

After Brad returns from setting a new cross-country speed record, he proposes to Carol, but she is in love with Doug. Doug doesn't know Carol's true feelings and with the test of the professor's aircraft imminent, he is at odds with Brad over the new aircraft's design. Brad has to fly the aircraft for US Army officials but is worried that the heavy test equipment will make the aircraft dangerous to fly. Doug will fly with him on the test and when a 9g power dive is scheduled, Doug passes out. The test equipment breaks free, jamming the rudder. Brad forces Doug to parachute to safety, and then cuts the rudder wires, grabbing them with his bare hands. He manages to land the aircraft safely although his hands are cut badly. With the aircraft accepted, Brad gives up test flying to become a vice-president of McMasters Aviation. Doug and Carol find happiness and marry.

== Cast ==
- Richard Arlen as Brad Farrell
- Jean Parker as Carol Blake
- Helen Mack as Betty Coles
- Don Castle as Doug Farrell
- Cliff Edwards as Squid Watkins
- Roger Pryor as Dan McMasters, company president
- Thomas W. Ross as Professor Blake
- Billy Lee as Brad Coles
- Louis Jean Heydt as Johnny Coles
- Alan Baldwin as Young Reporter
- Pat West as Burly Mechanic
- Ralph Byrd as Jackson, fellow draftsman
- Tom Dugan as The Waiter
- Helen Lynd as Giggly Blonde
- James Seay as Army Radio Operator

== Production ==
Power Dive was the first release by Picture Corp. of America, an independent production company formed in December 1940 headed by William Pine and William C. Thomas, former press agents and then associate producers at Paramount.

Pine and Thomas both worked in publicity—Pine was head of publicity for Paramount and Thomas was his assistant. They teamed with another publicist, Maxwell Shane, who was a writer. They decided to make lower budgeted films that did not have the overhead of the studios.

They talked with Richard Arlen, who had joined Paramount. Arlen became famous with Wings and suggested an aviation film. Arlen owned several planes and ran an aviation school; he offered himself and his aircraft for a movie. Pine and Thomas selected three titles, Power Dive, Forced Landing and Flying Blind, and wrote scripts around them. They went to Paramount and said they had a star and three scripts and asked for a distribution deal. Paramount agreed, enabling Pine and Thomas to get loans from the bank to finance the films.

Power Drive was made in ten days at a cost of $86,000 and earned almost a million dollars. They saved money by shooting on location. Thomas produced the first film while Pine was an associate—he worked for Cecil B. De Mille. All three films cost under $90,000 and returned six times its negative cost. Paramount was so pleased with these results that it offered to finance the duo's films from then on.

Principal photography took place from January 23 to mid-February 1941 with some scenes shot on location at the Metropolitan Airport in Van Nuys, California.

Opening credits include the following statement: "Creative acknowledgement for technical assistance in use of Geodetic plane to the Plxweve Aircraft Corporation." (Note: Although described in the film as an aircraft with geodetic airframe "plastic" construction, the Greenleaf CT-6A made by Plxweve aircraft, was actually constructed with a wooden geodetic airframe covered in plywood.) A Phillips 1-B Aeroneer (NX16075) and a Player CT-6A (Plxweve/Greenleaf CT-6A) (NX 19994), made by Plxweve Aircraft Co., were featured in the film. Reviews noted that writer Edward Churchill had an aviation background and that star Richard Arlen was running a flyers' training school near Hollywood.

== Reception ==
Power Dive was primarily a B film. Aviation Film Historian James H. Farmer characterized the film as a "fast-paced, low-budget formula film ..." Variety called it "... good program entertainment, taking full advantage of present interest in aviation and national preparedness."
