= Sikorsky S-45 =

1938 American flying boat design

S-45

General information
- Type: Proposed flying boat airliner
- National origin: United States
- Manufacturer: Sikorsky Aircraft
- Number built: 0

The Sikorsky S-45 was a proposed double-deck transoceanic flying boat originally designed in 1938 by Sikorsky Aircraft for Pan Am. The high wing monoplane featured a single-step hull with a triple-tail and was to be powered by six Wright R-3350 Duplex-Cyclone engines which were being developed at the time. The aircraft would have competed with the Boeing 314 but no examples of the S-45 were ever manufactured.

== Specifications ==
Data from Global Security

General characteristics

- Capacity: 100 passengers
- Length: 155.5 ft (47.4 m)
- Wingspan: 236 ft (72 m)
- Height: 25.75 ft (7.85 m)
- Wing area: 4,670 sq ft (434 m^{2})
- Empty weight: 34,930 lb (15,844 kg)
- Gross weight: 87,000 lb (39,463 kg)
- Powerplant: 6 × Wright R-3350 Duplex-Cyclone Air-cooled 18-cylinder radial engines, 2,500 hp (1,900 kW) each

Performance

- Cruise speed: 200 mph (320 km/h, 170 kn)
- Range: 5,000 mi (8,000 km, 4,300 nmi)
