= Prairie Hill, Washington County, Texas =

Unincorporated community in Texas, US

Prairie Hill (Texas)

Prairie Hill is an unincorporated community in Washington County, Texas, United States. Founded in 1870, the community flourished from the 1880s through to the 1960s and is still in existence today.

== Location ==
Prairie Hill is six miles north of the city of Brenham, centered on the corner of Old Independence Road (County Road 60) and Prairie Hill Road (County Road 63). It is located at 30°14′56″N 96°22′38″W.

== Major features ==
Saint John Lutheran Church, aka Prairie Hill Church

The corner of Prairie Hill Road and Old Independence Road was the heart of the Prairie Hill community. Saint John Lutheran Church was located there, as was the Hafer General Store, the Prairie Hill School, and the doctor's office. The Prairie Hill dance hall was located about a half-mile north on Old Independence Road. The Prairie Hill Cemetery (officially the cemetery of Saint John Lutheran) and the cotton gin were adjacent to the church.

Today, Saint John Evangelical Lutheran Church and its cemetery are the only remaining structures from the old Prairie Hill community.

== History ==
Prairie Hill was originally settled by German immigrants in the early 1870s. In 1876 the church was organized as St. John's Lutheran Church. This structure was enlarged in 1911, and then burned down in 1912. The structure was rebuilt the same year. The church joined the Texas Lutheran synod in 1925.

== Prairie Hill today ==
Much of what made Prairie Hill a community is no longer present (the school, the dancehall, and the general store), and for this reason, some would consider Prairie Hill a ghost town. However, it continues to be an active community. Saint John Lutheran of Prairie Hill is an active congregation with over 450 members, and is the center of community life. Many community activities are sponsored by or supported by the congregation. Prairie Hill Books - an online bookstore - operates where the Prairie Hill School once stood. The Prairie Hill Volunteer Fire Department still operates out of the firehouse in Prairie Hill. There are also active Prairie Hill chapters of the 4-H and the County Extension office.

== Notable person ==
- Nell O'Day - actress, born in Prairie Hill
