= Kathryn Adams Doty =

American actress, psychologist, and writer

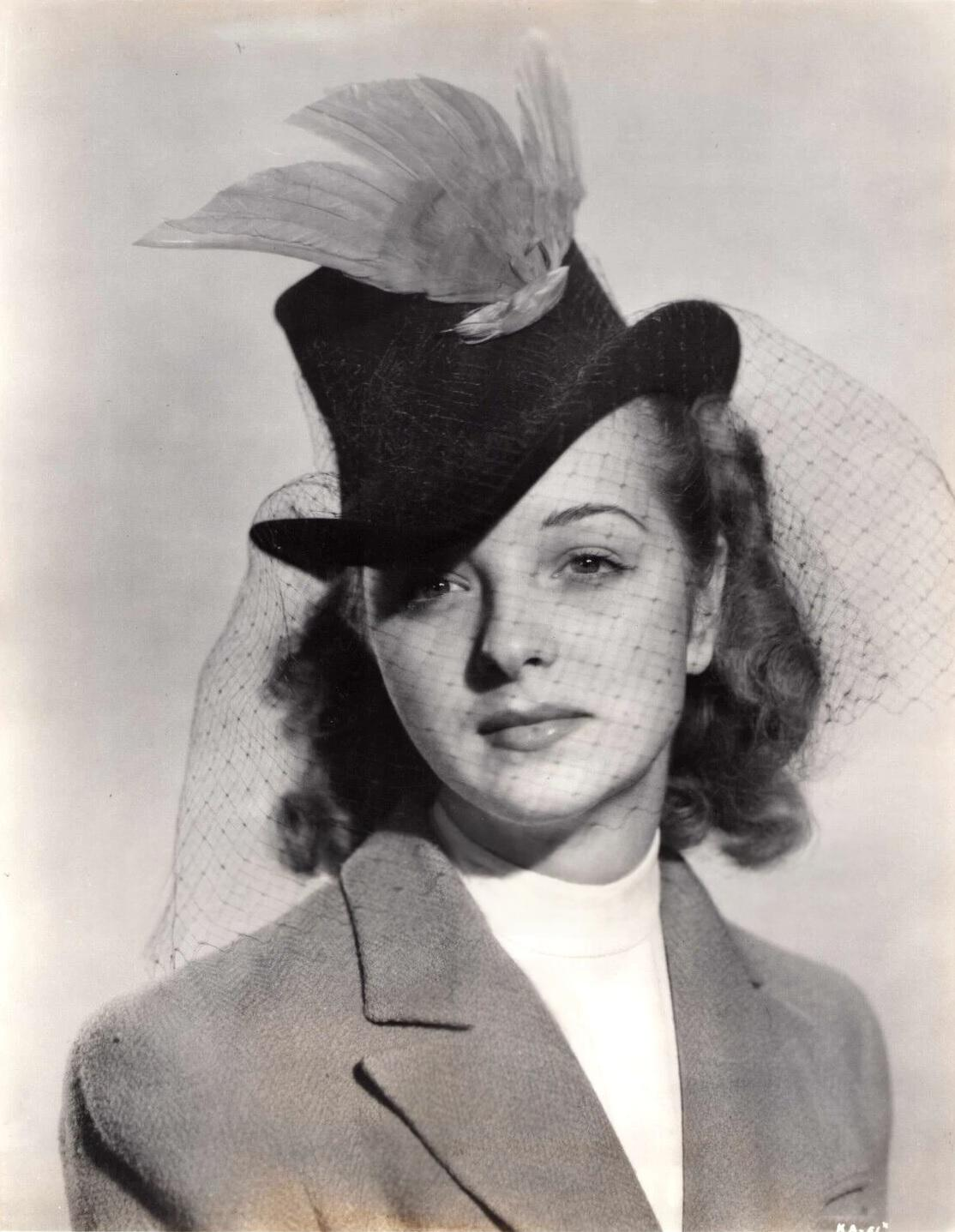
- Born: Kathryn Elizabeth Hohn; July 15, 1920; New Ulm, Minnesota, U.S.
- Died: October 14, 2016 (aged 96); Mankato, Minnesota, U.S.
- Education: Hamline University
- Occupations: Actress; novelist; psychologist
- Years active: 1939–1946 (acting career)
- Spouses: Hugh Beaumont (m. 1941; div. 1974); Fred Doty (m. 1976; died 2011)
- Children: 3

Kathryn Elizabeth Doty (née Hohn; July 15, 1920 – October 14, 2016), also known by her stage name Kathryn Adams or as Kathryn Adams Doty, was an American actress, novelist and psychologist.

== Early life and education ==
The daughter of a Methodist minister, Dr. Chris G. Hohn, Doty was born in New Ulm, Minnesota. When she was six, the family moved to Warrenton, Missouri, where her father was chaplain and executive secretary at an orphans' home. After she developed lung problems, she spent two years at a camp in Minnesota. As early as age 13, she took her father's place in the pulpit when he was sick. In a 1939 newspaper article, she recalled: "It was quite a radical thing, in that small town, for a little girl to conduct the church services and preach the sermon, but the congregation understood and were very kind to me."

Doty was a student at Hamline University in Saint Paul, Minnesota, (where she sang in the a cappella choir) and worked as a catalog clerk at the headquarters of Montgomery Ward when an opportunity for an acting career arose. She competed in 1939 in the national finals of the Jesse L. Lasky radio contest Gateway to Hollywood, received a contract, and remained in California to begin a film career under the name of Kathryn Adams.

== Film ==
Doty debuted on film in Fifth Avenue Girl (1939). One of her more notable roles was as Mrs. Brown, the young mother in Alfred Hitchcock's Saboteur (1942). She co-starred in Sky Raiders (1941), a film serial from Universal Pictures, and had the leading lady role in three Western films in which Johnny Mack Brown starred.

== Personal life ==
She married fellow actor Hugh Beaumont in an Easter wedding on April 13, 1941, at Hollywood Congregational Church.

She earned a master's degree in educational psychology and had a career as a medical practitioner, working at the Footlight's Child Guidance Clinic at Hollywood Presbyterian Medical Center and later in Minnesota after she moved back to her home state.

== Writing ==
Writing as Kathryn Doty, she published short stories in Pocket, The Friend and various children's magazines.

== Death ==
Adams died on October 14, 2016, aged 96, in an assisted living facility in Mankato, Minnesota.

== Partial filmography ==
- Fifth Avenue Girl (1939) - Katherine Borden
- That's Right—You're Wrong (1939) - Mrs. Elizabeth Ralston (uncredited)
- The Hunchback of Notre Dame (1939) - Fleur's Companion
- Millionaire Playboy (1940) - Betty (uncredited)
- If I Had My Way (1940) - Miss Corbett
- Ski Patrol (1940) - Lissa Ryder
- Love, Honor, and Oh-Baby! (1940) - Susan
- Black Diamonds (1940) - Linda Connor
- Argentine Nights (1940) - Carol
- Spring Parade (1940) - Girl with Fortune Teller (uncredited)
- The Invisible Woman (1940) - Peggy
- Meet the Chump (1941) - Gloria Mitchell
- Nice Girl? (1941) - Bride (uncredited)
- Bury Me Not on the Prairie (1941) - Dorothy Walker
- Sky Raiders (1941) - Mary Blake
- Model Wife (1941) - Salesgirl (uncredited)
- Bachelor Daddy (1941) - Eleanore Pierce, aka Jane Smith
- Rawhide Rangers (1941) - Jo Ann Rawlings
- Unfinished Business (1941) - Katy
- Arizona Cyclone (1941) - Elsie
- Hellzapoppin' (1941) - Girl (uncredited)
- Junior G-Men of the Air (1942) - Grace - Bolt's Girl [Chs. 1, 7] (uncredited)
- Saboteur (1942) - Young Mother
- You're Telling Me (1942) - Girl (uncredited)
- Blonde for a Day (1946) - Phyllis Hamilton (final film role)
