= The Masked Rider (1941 film) =

1941 film by Ford Beebe

- Theatrical release poster
- Directed by: Ford Beebe
- Screenplay by: Sherman L. Lowe; Victor McLeod
- Story by: Sam Robins
- Produced by: Will Cowan
- Starring: Johnny Mack Brown; Fuzzy Knight; Nell O'Day; Grant Withers; Virginia Carroll; Guy D'Ennery
- Cinematography: Charles Van Enger
- Edited by: Paul Landres
- Production company: Universal Pictures
- Distributed by: Universal Pictures
- Release date: October 24, 1941
- Running time: 58 minutes
- Country: United States
- Language: English

The Masked Rider is a 1941 American Western film directed by Ford Beebe and written by Sherman L. Lowe and Victor McLeod. The film stars Johnny Mack Brown, Fuzzy Knight, Nell O'Day, Grant Withers, Virginia Carroll and Guy D'Ennery. The film was released on October 24, 1941, by Universal Pictures.

== Cast ==
- Johnny Mack Brown as Larry Prescott
- Fuzzy Knight as Patches McQuilt
- Nell O'Day as Jean Malone
- Grant Withers as Douglas
- Virginia Carroll as Margarita Valdez
- Guy D'Ennery as Don Sebastian Valdez
- Carmella Cansino as Carmencita
- Roy Barcroft as Luke
- Dick Botiller as Pedro
- Fred Cordova as Pablo
- Al Haskell as Jose
- Rico De Montez as Manuel
- Bob O'Connor as Mine Guard
