= Stagecoach Buckaroo =

1942 film by Ray Taylor

- Theatrical release poster
- Directed by: Ray Taylor
- Screenplay by: Al Martin
- Story by: Arthur St. Claire
- Produced by: Will Cowan
- Starring: Johnny Mack Brown; Fuzzy Knight; Nell O'Day; Anne Nagel; Herbert Rawlinson; Glenn Strange
- Cinematography: Jerome Ash
- Edited by: Maurice Wright
- Production company: Universal Pictures
- Distributed by: Universal Pictures
- Release date: February 13, 1942
- Running time: 58 minutes
- Country: United States
- Language: English

Stagecoach Buckaroo is a 1942 American Western film directed by Ray Taylor and written by Al Martin. The film stars Johnny Mack Brown, Fuzzy Knight, Nell O'Day, Anne Nagel, Herbert Rawlinson and Glenn Strange. The film was released on February 13, 1942, by Universal Pictures.

== Cast ==
- Johnny Mack Brown as Steve Hardin
- Fuzzy Knight as Clem Clemmons
- Nell O'Day as Molly Denton
- Anne Nagel as Nina Kincaid
- Herbert Rawlinson as Bill Kincaid
- Glenn Strange as Breck Braddock
- Henry Hall as Joseph Denton
- Ernie Adams as Blinky
- Lloyd Ingraham as Ezra Simpson
- Frank Brownlee as Higgins
- Jack C. Smith as Sheriff
- Harry Tenbrook as Slatz
- Blackie Whiteford as Hogan
