= Fighting Bill Fargo =

1941 film directed by Ray Taylor

- Theatrical release poster
- Directed by: Ray Taylor
- Screenplay by: Paul Franklin; Arthur V. Jones; Dorcas Cochran
- Story by: Paul Franklin
- Produced by: Will Cowan
- Starring: Johnny Mack Brown; Fuzzy Knight; Jean Brooks; Kenneth Harlan; Nell O'Day; Ted Adams
- Cinematography: Charles Van Enger
- Edited by: Paul Landres
- Production company: Universal Pictures
- Distributed by: Universal Pictures
- Release date: December 9, 1941
- Running time: 57 minutes
- Country: United States
- Language: English

Fighting Bill Fargo is a 1941 American Western film directed by Ray Taylor and written by Paul Franklin, Arthur V. Jones and Dorcas Cochran. The film stars Johnny Mack Brown, Fuzzy Knight, Jean Brooks, Kenneth Harlan, Nell O'Day and Ted Adams. The film was released on December 9, 1941, by Universal Pictures.

== Plot ==
Bill Fargo, played by Johnny Mack Brown, comes back to his hometown to help his sister run the newspaper their father left them. He soon gets involved in local politics when Hackett, a political boss played by Kenneth Harlan, pulls him into a complicated situation to eliminate honest candidates for sheriff.

== Cast ==
- Johnny Mack Brown as Bill Fargo
- Fuzzy Knight as Scoop
- Jean Brooks as Linda Tyler
- Kenneth Harlan as Hackett
- Nell O'Day as Julie Fargo
- Ted Adams as Vic Savage
- James Blaine as Cash Scanlon
- Alan Bridge as Tom Houston
