= Arizona Cyclone =

1941 film by Joseph H. Lewis

- Theatrical release poster
- Directed by: Joseph H. Lewis
- Screenplay by: Sherman L. Lowe
- Produced by: Will Cowan
- Starring: Johnny Mack Brown; Fuzzy Knight; Nell O'Day; Kathryn Adams Doty; Herbert Rawlinson; Dick Curtis
- Cinematography: Charles Van Enger
- Edited by: Paul Landres
- Production company: Universal Pictures
- Distributed by: Universal Pictures
- Release date: November 14, 1941
- Running time: 59 minutes
- Country: United States
- Language: English

Arizona Cyclone is a 1941 American Western film directed by Joseph H. Lewis and written by Sherman L. Lowe. The film stars Johnny Mack Brown, Fuzzy Knight, Nell O'Day, Kathryn Adams Doty, Herbert Rawlinson and Dick Curtis. The film was released on November 14, 1941, by Universal Pictures.

== Cast ==
- Johnny Mack Brown as Tom Baxter
- Fuzzy Knight as Muleshoe
- Nell O'Day as Claire Randolph
- Kathryn Adams Doty as Elsie Graham
- Herbert Rawlinson as George Randolph
- Dick Curtis as Quirt Crenshaw
- Robert Strange as Adam Draper
- Glenn Strange as Roy Jessup
- Carl Sepulveda as Waters
- Chuck Morrison as Jack
- Buck Moulton as Nick
- Jack Rube Clifford as Johnson
