= Gang Busters =

American dramatic radio program (1936–1957)

- Country of origin: United States
- Language: English
- Created by: Phillips H. Lord
- Original release: January 15, 1936 – November 27, 1957

Gang Busters is an American dramatic radio program heralded as "the only national program that brings you authentic police case histories." It premiered on January 15, 1936 and was broadcast for more 21 years through November 27, 1957.

== History ==
Magazines of the true crime variety were highly popular in the 1930s and the film G Men starring James Cagney, released in the spring of 1935, found a large audience. Producer-director Phillips H. Lord believed that there was a place on radio for a show of the same type. To emphasize the authenticity of his dramatizations, Lord produced the initial radio show, G-Men, in close association with FBI director J. Edgar Hoover, who was not favorable to the idea of such a program, but U. S. attorney general Homer Stille Cummings contributed his full support.

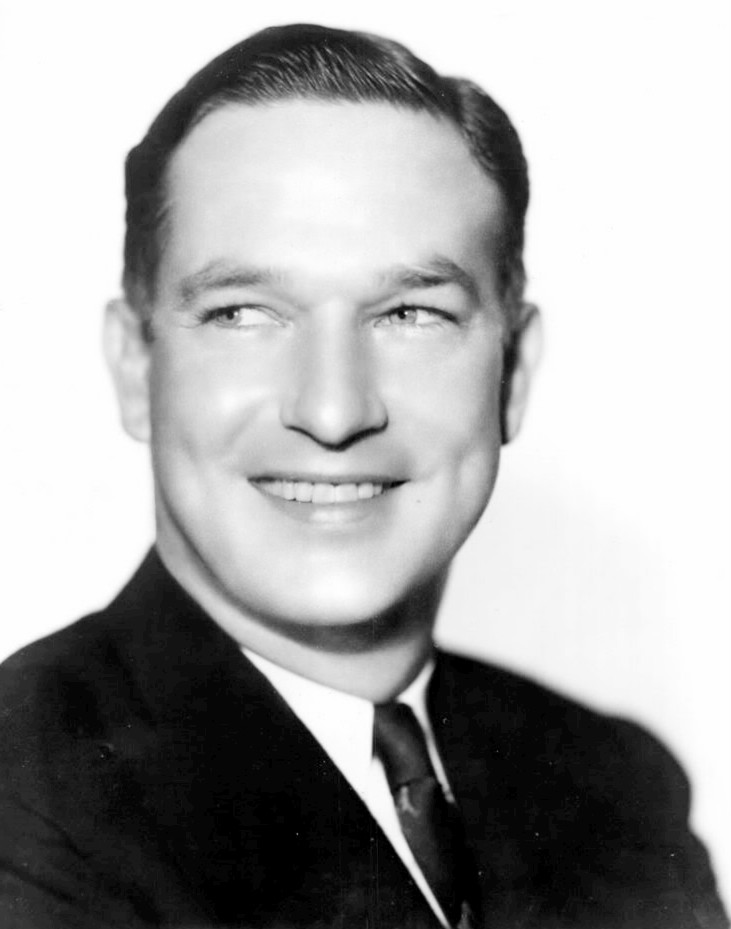
Phillips H. Lord created the radio series.

G-Men dramatized FBI cases, but Hoover insisted that only closed cases would be used. Hoover also demanded that he or a top-level aide review and approve every script. Hoover preferred that scripts downplay gunfights and car chases and spend more time on systematic investigation and legwork, with agents depicted as intelligent, hard-working and essentially faceless cogs in his technically savvy crime-fighting organization. Those restrictions hampered Lord, who saw his creation as a public service, but one that had to entertain as well as inform.

The first program dramatized the story of the notorious gangster John Dillinger, who was pursued and killed by FBI agents in 1934. The second covered Lester Joseph Gillis, a.k.a. Baby Face Nelson.This was a new style of radio show. Hypersensitive to any criticism, Hoover proved difficult for Lord and almost squelched the project altogether.

G-Men, using only FBI cases, was subject to Hoover's whims and restrictions. Gang Busters, however, featured interesting and dramatic crimes from the files of law-enforcement organizations all over the country. G-Men aired on NBC Radio from July 20 to October 12, 1935, sponsored by Chevrolet.

The second series of Gang Busters programs debuted in mid-January 1936. The opening sound effects became even more elaborate and aggressive, including a shrill police whistle, convicts marching in formation, police sirens wailing, machine guns firing and tires squealing. An authoritative voice would then announce the title of that night's program, followed by more blasts from a police whistle. This intrusive introduction led to the popular catchphrase "came on like gangbusters."

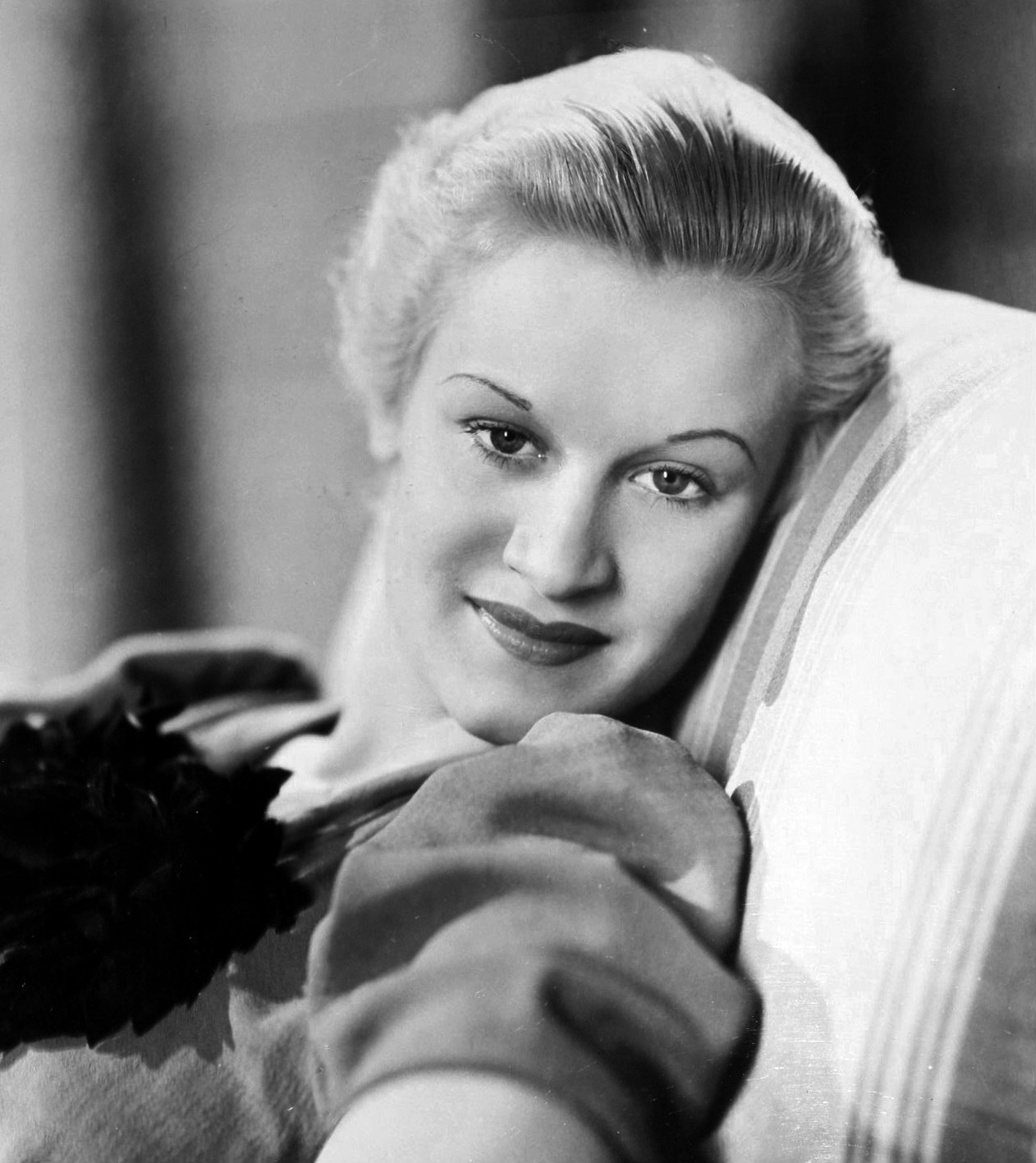
Joan Banks was a regular cast member of the radio series.

To lend an extra air of authenticity to the presentation, Lord had Norman Schwarzkopf Sr., former head of the New Jersey State Police, deliver a brief introduction to lead into the actual dramatization. That authentic voice became even more important after Lord ended his connection with the FBI. After about 1945, New York City police commissioner Lewis Joseph Valentine replaced Schwarzkopf as the authoritative opening speaker.

Gang Busters aired on CBS from January 15, 1936 to June 15, 1940, sponsored by Colgate-Palmolive and Cue magazine. From October 11, 1940 to December 25, 1948, it was heard on the Blue Network, with various sponsors that included Sloan's Liniment, Waterman pens and Tide. Returning to CBS on January 8, 1949, it ran until June 25, 1955, sponsored by Grape-Nuts and Wrigley's chewing gum. The final series aired on the Mutual Broadcasting System from October 5, 1955 to November 27, 1957.

Gang Busters often featured prominent names in radio broadcasting, many of whom also starred in films and television, including Richard Widmark and Art Carney. Joan Banks, who later played many television roles, was a regular cast member, and her husband Frank Lovejoy also appeared often. Larry Haines was another regular on the show and would later enjoy an extensive career in television soap operas.

== Comics ==
John Prentice cover for DC Comics' Gang Busters 47 (August–September 1955)

France Herron (left) and Jack Schiff (right) on the cover of DC Comics' Gang Busters 10 (June–July 1949)

The popularity of the radio show prompted a spinoff comic book published by DC Comics that ran for 67 issues between 1947 and 1958. Big Little Books based on the series were also produced.

== Film and television versions ==
Universal Pictures produced a very popular Gang Busters serial film in 1942 starring Kent Taylor, Irene Hervey, Ralph Morgan, and Robert Armstrong.

NBC aired a 30-minute television series version from March 20, 1952 to October 23, 1952, hosted by Chester Morris. The series fared well in the Nielsen ratings, finishing at #14 in the 1951–1952 season and at #8 in 1952–1953. It was canceled because it alternated weekly with Dragnet, and when that series could produce enough episodes weekly, NBC had no more use for Gang Busters as a stopgap show.

Episodes of the show were later reedited into two feature films, Gang Busters (1955, with Myron Healey as Public Enemy No. 4) and Guns Don't Argue (1957, with Healey as John Dillinger).

In 1953, NBC's film division syndicated the episodes, with the title changed to Captured. An ad for the program indicated that nine episodes of the syndicated version were new; those episodes had a copyright date of 1955. Vivi Janiss was cast in three television episodes: "The Blonde Tigress" (1952), "The Rocco Case" (1952) and The Rocco Trapani Case" (1955).
