= Phillips Lord =

American radio program writer, creator, producer and narrator (1902–1975)

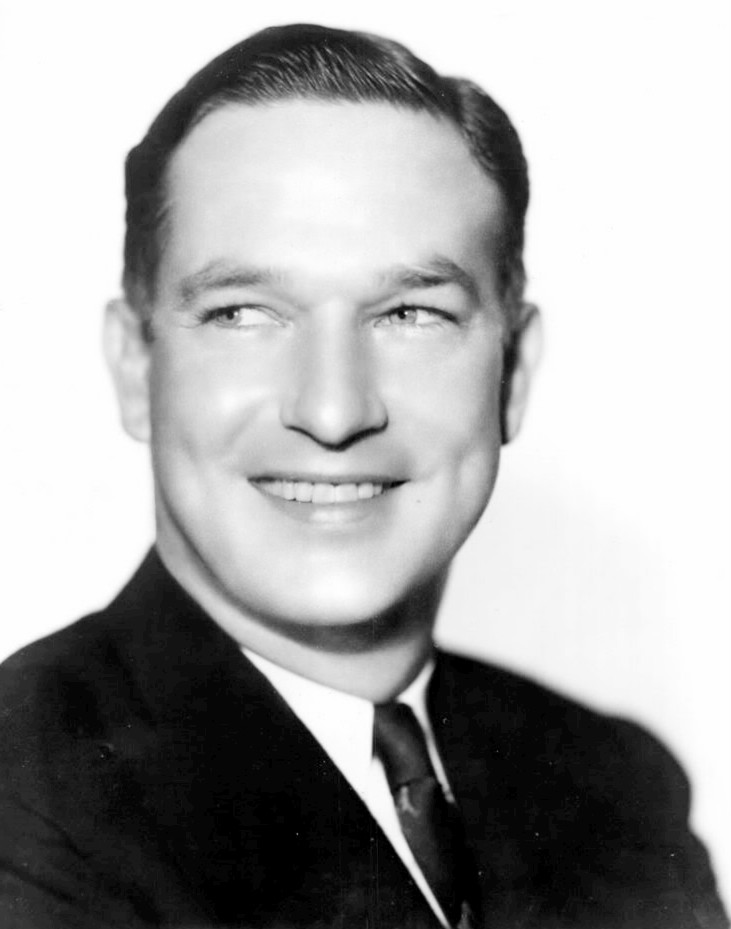
- Lord in 1936
- Born: Phillips Haynes Lord; July 13, 1902; Hartford, Vermont, U.S.
- Died: October 19, 1975 (aged 73); Ellsworth, Maine, U.S.
- Occupations: Broadcaster, actor

Phillips Haynes Lord (July 13, 1902 – October 19, 1975) was an American radio program writer, creator, producer and narrator as well as a motion picture actor, best known for the Gang Busters radio program that was broadcast from 1935 to 1957.

== Early life ==
Lord was born in the small town of Hartford, Vermont, the son of Albert J. Lord, a Protestant clergyman, and his wife Maude Phillips Lord. He was still an infant when his family moved to Meriden, Connecticut, where his father accepted the pastorship of a local church. As a boy, Lord spent his summers with relatives in Maine, and after completing high school he studied at Phillips Academy in Andover, Massachusetts, before going to Bowdoin College in Brunswick, Maine. While still in college he established myriad businesses, including a book-selling operation, a shoe repair service, and a taxi cab company.

After graduation, the 22-year-old was hired as the principal at the high school in the small town of Plainville, Connecticut, reportedly the youngest person in the United States to ever hold such a position. He soon grew bored with the job and headed to New York City, where, after a series of jobs in publishing, he began writing scripts for radio.

== The Seth Parker years ==
Lord was still in his twenties and living in New York City when he became a national radio personality. Creating the character "Seth Parker", a clergyman and backwoods philosopher based on his real-life grandfather, Hosea Phillips, Lord wrote stories for radio of rural New England life featuring ordinary folks singing hymns and telling jokes and stories; the show also regularly included a 15-second time of silent prayer, which Lord credited for much of the broadcast's popularity. On his own initiative, he communicated with several stations across the U.S. and sold them scripts he labeled as "Seth Parker's Singing School". An instant hit, Lord was soon contacted by NBC Radio, which contracted to buy scripts for a show to run six days a week that NBC called "Sunday Evening at Seth Parker's".

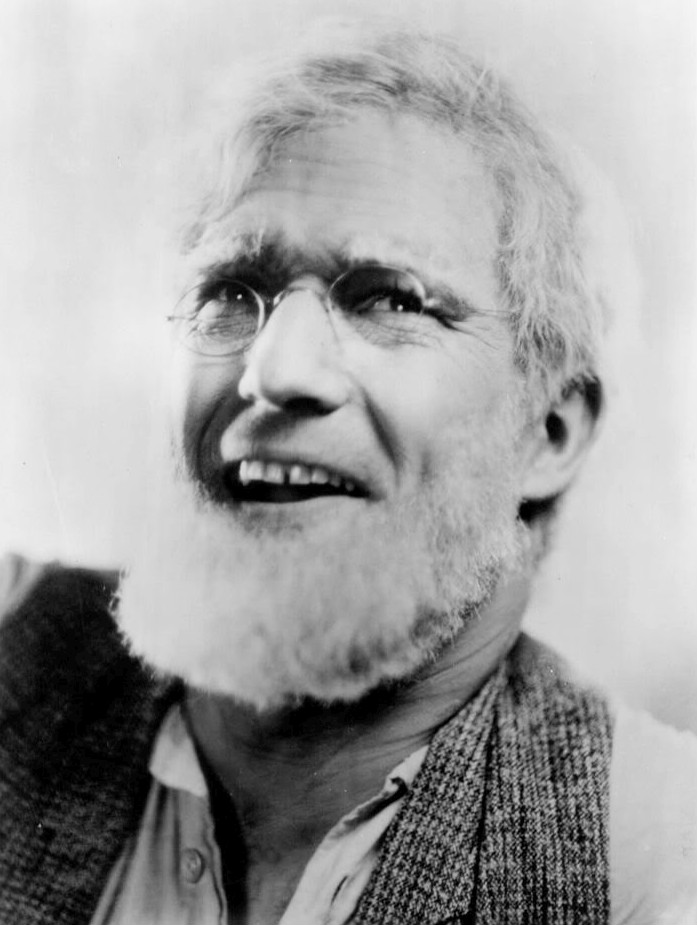
Lord as Seth Parker in 1939

This was followed by other magazine publications that acquired his scripts, and before long Lord was earning close to $100,000 a year. Not limited in his scope, during this time he wrote other successful radio programs that were designed to conclude after a specific number of episodes were broadcast. Lord's growing popularity resulted in his publishing two books in 1930, titled Seth Parker's Album and Seth Parker's Hymnal, that led to the release of 78rpm gospel records by the "Phillips Lord Trio". Lord and the radio show gained a wide audience and the September 1931 issue of The American Magazine had a feature article on him under the heading: "At 29 He Has Made a Million Friends".

In 1932, Lord published a book titled Seth Parker & His Jonesport Folks: Way Back Home from which he also wrote a stage play titled Seth Parker's Jonesport Folks; an entertainment in two acts. The book was published to coincide with the release of his 1932 motion picture produced by RKO Radio Pictures Inc., which used the shorter title from the book, Way Back Home. Starring opposite Bette Davis, Lord was billed as "Seth Parker, Preacher". Because the radio program was unknown in England, the motion picture was released there with the title Old Greatheart.

In 1933, Lord came up with the idea of buying a sailing ship and broadcasting his show via short-wave radio while sailing to exotic places around the world with a team of celebrities. He purchased the 188-foot, 867-ton four-masted schooner Georgette, which he renamed Seth Parker. Its masts were 125 feet tall. Much promotional material was released in advance of the adventure, including that Mr. Eugene Nohl would be bringing the "Hell Below", a diving shell to be used for undersea exploration. Equipped with the necessary under-water photographic equipment donated by the Pathé film studios, the hype surrounding the voyage promised that Eugene Nohl would photograph "the sunken civilizations of the South Seas Islands, of its deep marine life and formations" and of course "search for sunken treasure and bring back film of shipwrecks".

Sponsored by the Frigidaire appliance company, in December 1933 the schooner Seth Parker set sail for the South Pacific via the Panama Canal. Departing from Portland, Maine, the ship docked at various ports along the eastern seaboard such as Philadelphia, Pennsylvania, and Jacksonville, Florida, from where they broadcast their short-wave radio program that was retransmitted by NBC. For the listening public, this was a grand adventure by a group of wholesome Americans led by the creator of Rev. Seth Parker. However, the broadcasts revealed a bit of the frivolity behind the scenes of a voyage filled with wine, women and the kind of songs that were not found in any Seth Parker hymnal. In February 1935, disaster struck in the form of a tropical storm off the coast of American Samoa. The ship was severely damaged to the point where the expedition had to be abandoned, which spelled the end of the radio program. The ship's distress signal on February 11 was answered by HMAS Australia, which was carrying the Duke of Gloucester home to the United Kingdom. With little visible damage, Lord declined the offer of support, only to summon back the Australia with another distress call early the next morning. In heavy seas, the Australia took on board nine of the schooner's crew. In response to speculation that the distress signals were a hoax, the Australian government confirmed in May that they were genuine and that no action would be taken against Lord.

Despite everything, the shortened expedition proved immensely popular with the listening audience, and the Frigidaire company promoted a 32-page illustrated booklet called Aboard the Seth Parker to publicize the voyage and as an advertisement for Frigidaire equipment on the ship. The schooner was eventually sold and its new owner managed to sail it to Coconut Island in Kane'ohe Bay, O'ahu, Hawaii, where it was permanently anchored for use as a bar and movie theater by Fleischmann's Yeast heir Christian Holmes II. It can be seen in the 1948 Republic Pictures movie Wake of the Red Witch starring John Wayne and Gail Russell. In 1999, broadcast historian Elizabeth McLeod listed the Cruise of the Seth Parker as one of the top 100 old-time radio moments of the 20th century.

== The Gang Busters era ==
After returning from his sailing adventure, Lord immediately set about writing and creating a new radio program. He switched from the kindly Seth Parker persona to a dark and ominous narrator's voice for his Gang Busters program, billed as "The Crime Fighters of American Broadcasting". A law enforcement reality series using authentic case histories, during the 1930s the program was hosted by Col. H. Norman Schwarzkopf and featured various actors such as Art Carney. The thirty-minute program ran on Wednesday nights at 10:00 p.m. on CBS radio and opened with the portentous sounds of machine gun fire, police whistles screaming and tires screeching, causing the phrase "coming on like gangbusters" to be coined. Copied years later by the television show America's Most Wanted, each episode of Gang Busters had up-to-the-minute reports of criminals wanted by the FBI or other law enforcement officials, many of whom were later arrested due to tips from listeners. To accomplish this, Lord hired actor/writer/civil servant Helen Sioussat (1902–1995), who later became the head of the Talks and Public Affairs Department at CBS. Such was the influence of Lord that Sioussat was given a Washington D.C. office next to J. Edgar Hoover at the Justice Department, where she was allowed access to official information from files upon which the radio series was based.

The Gang Busters radio show was an enormous long-running success with 1,008 radio broadcasts over twenty-one years from July 20, 1935, to November 20, 1957. It also spawned a long-running DC Comics comic book of the same name, and was the basis for a motion picture with the same title as well as a half-hour weekly television series in 1952, both of which were narrated by Lord. In 1954, several episodes of the television series were used to create another documentary-style motion picture of the same title. The film proved successful enough that a second was put together in 1957 from more of the old television episodes and released under the title Guns Don't Argue. In 1998, Gang Busters was part of the 30-hour audio cassette called CBS's 60 Greatest Old-Time Radio Shows.

== Other accomplishments ==
Among his numerous other radio creations, with World War II and the Battle of Britain raging in Europe, between December 1939 and August 1940 Lord produced a radio show about aviators that opened with an interview of a real-life pilot recounting an exciting adventure in the air after which the show moved to a dramatization played by radio actors. From 1939 to 1952, he produced Mr. District Attorney, a 30-minute crime show inspired by the real-life exploits of New York's racket-busting district attorney Thomas Dewey. The radio broadcast spawned a 1941 motion picture from Republic Pictures of the same name and a 1947 Columbia Pictures production. A comic book series, Mr. District Attorney, was published by DC Comics from 1948–1959.

Lord produced the radio series By Kathleen Norris, making Norris "the first nationally famous writer to have her works brought to radio listeners as a daily serial program." The program was broadcast on CBS October 9, 1939 – September 26, 1941.

Lord's contribution to the radio industry was recognized with a star on the Hollywood Walk of Fame at 6912 Hollywood Blvd. He died in 1975 in Ellsworth, Maine. In 2004, his story was told by author Martin Grams, Jr. in the book Gang Busters: The Crime Fighters of American Broadcasting.

Phillips Lord was also instrumental in raising awareness and money for the restoration of the USS Constitution.

In later years, he retired to a home he built in Surry, Maine, and developed The Gatherings Campground nearby; it is still extant today. It is also known as The Gatherings Family Campground, but the locals just call it "The Gatherings".

He also built the Jordan River Country Club in Trenton Maine, and helped develop & establish many businesses on the Bar Harbor rd in Trenton including the Cheese House, The Country Store & Trenton Trading Post (Now known as Acadia World Traders)

== Marriages and children ==
Phillips Lord's first wife was Sophia Mecorney, and they had two children, Jean Phillips Lord and Patricia Ann Lord. They were divorced sometime after the second child was born. After her marriage to Phillips Lord, she acted in the role of Lizzy Peters in his Seth Parker radio show in the 1930s and appeared as Lizzie in the Seth Parker movie "Way Back Home", which also starred Bette Davis.

Phillips Lord married Donnie Boone on March 21, 1941.

See, https://timesmachine.nytimes.com/timesmachine/1941/03/22/85468770.html?pageNumber=19

https://www.nytimes.com/1941/03/22/archives/miss-donnie-e-boone-becomes-the-bride-of-phillips-haynes-lord-of.html

They had only one child, Phillipa Susan Lord. The couple divorced in 1950.
