= List of Universal Pictures films (1940–1949) =

This is a list of films produced or distributed by Universal Pictures in 1940–1949, founded in 1912 as the Universal Film Manufacturing Company. It is the main motion picture production and distribution arm of Universal Studios, a subsidiary of the NBCUniversal division of Comcast.

== 1940 ==
Release date	Title	Notes
January 9, 1940	The Green Hornet	Film serial
January 12, 1940	The Invisible Man Returns	
January 19, 1940	West of Carson City	
January 24, 1940	Chip of the Flying U	
January 26, 1940	Green Hell	
February 1, 1940	Oh Johnny, How You Can Love	
February 2, 1940	Danger on Wheels	
February 16, 1940	Honeymoon Deferred	
February 23, 1940	Framed	
March 1, 1940	Boss of Bullion City	
March 1, 1940	Double Alibi	
March 3, 1940	Flash Gordon Conquers the Universe (Note: Owned by Lionsgate)	Film serial
March 8, 1940	Zanzibar	
March 15, 1940	Ma! He's Making Eyes at Me	
March 15, 1940	My Little Chickadee	
March 22, 1940	It's a Date (Note: Owned by Warner Bros. (via Turner Entertainment Co.))	distribution only; produced by Joe Pasternak Productions
April 5, 1940	Half a Sinner	
April 5, 1940	Riders of Pasco Basin	
April 12, 1940	Black Friday	
April 12, 1940	The House of the Seven Gables	
April 19, 1940	Enemy Agent	
May 5, 1940	If I Had My Way	
May 10, 1940	Ski Patrol	
May 17, 1940	Alias the Deacon	
May 21, 1940	Sandy Is a Lady	
May 24, 1940	Hot Steel	
May 31, 1940	La Conga Nights	
May 1940	I Can't Give You Anything But Love, Baby	
June 1, 1940	Bad Man from Red Butte	
June 7, 1940	Love, Honor and Oh-Baby!	
July 2, 1940	Winners of the West	Film serial
July 5, 1940	Private Affairs	
July 16, 1940	Black Diamonds	
July 26, 1940	Son of Roaring Dan	
July 26, 1940	You're Not So Tough	
August 2, 1940	South to Karanga	
August 9, 1940	The Boys from Syracuse	
August 23, 1940	When the Daltons Rode	
September 6, 1940	Argentine Nights	
September 13, 1940	Hired Wife	
September 13, 1940	The Leather Pushers	
September 20, 1940	Ragtime Cowboy Joe	
September 20, 1940	The Mummy's Hand	
September 27, 1940	Spring Parade	
October 1, 1940	Diamond Frontier	
October 1, 1940	Junior G-Men	Film serial
October 11, 1940	A Little Bit of Heaven	
October 18, 1940	Slightly Tempted	
October 25, 1940	Seven Sinners	
November 1, 1940	I'm Nobody's Sweetheart Now	
November 1, 1940	The Devil's Pipeline	
November 8, 1940	Sandy Gets Her Man	
November 15, 1940	One Night in the Tropics	
November 22, 1940	Meet the Wildcat	
November 28, 1940	Law and Order	
November 29, 1940	The Bank Dick	
December 1, 1940	Dark Streets of Cairo	
December 1, 1940	Pony Post	
December 6, 1940	Margie	
December 13, 1940	Trail of the Vigilantes	
December 20, 1940	Give Us Wings	
December 25, 1940	The San Francisco Docks	
December 27, 1940	The Invisible Woman	

== 1941 ==
Release date	Title	Notes
January 3, 1941	Lucky Devils	
January 3, 1941	Where Did You Get That Girl?	
January 4, 1941	The Green Hornet Strikes Again!	Film serial
January 17, 1941	Six Lessons from Madame La Zonga	
January 31, 1941	Buck Privates	
February 7, 1941	Back Street	
February 14, 1941	Meet the Chump	
February 21, 1941	Nice Girl?	
March 1, 1941	Mr. Dynamite	
March 14, 1941	Double Date	
March 21, 1941	Bury Me Not on the Lone Prairie	
March 21, 1941	The Man Who Lost Himself	
March 28, 1941	Horror Island	
March 28, 1941	Man Made Monster	
April 8, 1941	Sky Raiders	Film serial
April 11, 1941	The Lady from Cheyenne	
April 17, 1941	Mutiny in the Arctic	
April 18, 1941	Model Wife	
April 25, 1941	The Flame of New Orleans	
May 2, 1941	The Black Cat	
May 30, 1941	In the Navy	
May 1941	Men of the Timberland	
June 4, 1941	Bachelor Daddy	
June 13, 1941	Tight Shoes	
June 20, 1941	Law of the Range	
June 20, 1941	San Antonio Rose	
June 27, 1941	Hit the Road	
June 1941	Hello, Sucker	
July 1, 1941	Riders of Death Valley	
July 18, 1941	Raiders of the Desert	
July 18, 1941	Rawhide Rangers	
July 1941	Cracked Nuts	
August 1, 1941	Too Many Blondes	
August 8, 1941	Hold That Ghost	
August 22, 1941	A Dangerous Game	
August 22, 1941	This Woman Is Mine	
August 27, 1941	Unfinished Business	
September 5, 1941	Man from Montana	
September 15, 1941	Badlands of Dakota	
September 19, 1941	The Kid from Kansas	
September 19, 1941	Sing Another Chorus	
September 26, 1941	It Started with Eve	
October 3, 1941	Mob Town	
October 10, 1941	Never Give a Sucker an Even Break	
October 14, 1941	Sea Raiders	Film serial
October 17, 1941	Burma Convoy	
October 17, 1941	South of Tahiti	
October 24, 1941	Flying Cadets	
October 24, 1941	The Masked Rider	
October 31, 1941	Appointment for Love	
November 7, 1941	Swing It Soldier	
November 14, 1941	Arizona Cyclone	
November 21, 1941	Moonlight in Hawaii	
November 28, 1941	Keep 'Em Flying	
December 4, 1941	Paris Calling	
December 9, 1941	Fighting Bill Fargo	
December 9, 1941	Melody Lane	
December 12, 1941	The Wolf Man	
December 19, 1941	Road Agent	
December 26, 1941	Hellzapoppin'	
December 28, 1941	Quiet Wedding	

== 1942 ==
Release date	Title	Notes
January 2, 1942	Don't Get Personal	
January 2, 1942	Sealed Lips	
January 6, 1942	Don Winslow of the Navy	Film serial
January 11, 1942	Bombay Clipper	
January 23, 1942	North to the Klondike	
January 30, 1942	Treat 'Em Rough	
February 1, 1942	Jail House Blues	
February 13, 1942	Ride 'Em Cowboy	
February 13, 1942	Stagecoach Buckaroo	
February 20, 1942	What's Cookin'?	
February 27, 1942	The Mad Doctor of Market Street	
March 10, 1942	Unseen Enemy	
March 13, 1942	Frisco Lil	
March 13, 1942	The Ghost of Frankenstein	
March 20, 1942	Butch Minds the Baby	
March 23, 1942	Broadway	
March 27, 1942	Juke Box Jenny	
March 31, 1942	Gang Busters	Film serial
April 17, 1942	Mississippi Gambler	
April 17, 1942	The Strange Case of Doctor Rx	
April 23, 1942	The Mystery of Marie Roget	
April 24, 1942	Saboteur	
May 3, 1942	You're Telling Me	
May 15, 1942	Escape from Hong Kong	
May 22, 1942	Almost Married	
June 5, 1942	Tough as They Come	
June 10, 1942	Danger in the Pacific	
June 11, 1942	The Spoilers	
June 12, 1942	Private Buckaroo	
June 12, 1942	Top Sergeant	
June 16, 1942	Eagle Squadron	distribution only; co-production with Walter Wanger Productions
June 19, 1942	Lady in a Jam	
June 26, 1942	There's One Born Every Minute	
June 30, 1942	Junior G-Men of the Air	Film serial
July 3, 1942	Men of Texas	
July 17, 1942	Drums of the Congo	
August 1, 1942	Timber	
August 5, 1942	The Silver Bullet	
August 7, 1942	Invisible Agent	co-production with Frank Lloyd Productions
August 7, 1942	Pardon My Sarong	co-production with Mayfair Productions Inc.
August 21, 1942	Boss of Hangtown Mesa	
September 1, 1942	Give Out, Sisters	
September 4, 1942	Between Us Girls	
September 18, 1942	Halfway to Shanghai	
September 18, 1942	Sherlock Holmes and the Voice of Terror	distribution only
September 25, 1942	Deep in the Heart of Texas	
September 25, 1942	Sin Town	
September 27, 1942	Overland Mail	Film serial
October 2, 1942	Eyes of the Underworld	
October 2, 1942	Get Hep to Love	
October 9, 1942	Destination Unknown	
October 16, 1942	Moonlight in Havana	
October 20, 1942	Night Monster	
October 23, 1942	The Mummy's Tomb	
November 6, 1942	Who Done It?	
November 13, 1942	Little Joe, the Wrangler	
November 13, 1942	Nightmare	
November 20, 1942	Strictly in the Groove	
December 4, 1942	Behind the Eight Ball	
December 11, 1942	Madame Spy	
December 11, 1942	The Old Chisholm Trail	
December 11, 1942	Pittsburgh	
December 18, 1942	The Great Impersonation	
December 18, 1942	Mug Town	
December 24, 1942	When Johnny Comes Marching Home	
December 25, 1942	Arabian Nights	distribution only; co-production with Walter Wanger Productions

== 1943 ==
Release date	Title	Notes
January 5, 1943	The Adventures of Smilin' Jack	Film serial
January 15, 1943	Shadow of a Doubt	
January 1943	How's About It	
February 5, 1943	Tenting Tonight on the Old Camp Ground	
February 12, 1943	Sherlock Holmes and the Secret Weapon	distribution only
February 19, 1943	The Amazing Mrs. Holliday	
February 25, 1943	Hi'ya, Chum	
February 26, 1943	Hi, Buddy	
March 5, 1943	Frankenstein Meets the Wolf Man	
March 19, 1943	It Ain't Hay	
March 26, 1943	He's My Guy	
March 1943	Keep 'Em Slugging	
April 6, 1943	Don Winslow of the Coast Guard	Film serial
April 9, 1943	It Comes Up Love	
April 12, 1943	Cheyenne Roundup	
April 16, 1943	Rhythm of the Islands	
April 23, 1943	White Savage	
April 30, 1943	Sherlock Holmes in Washington	distribution only
April 1943	Follow the Band	
May 1, 1943	Raiders of San Joaquin	
May 5, 1943	The Next of Kin	
May 7, 1943	Good Morning, Judge	
May 21, 1943	Cowboy in Manhattan	
May 28, 1943	Mister Big	
June 2, 1943	Hit the Ice	
June 4, 1943	Captive Wild Woman	
June 11, 1943	All by Myself	
June 18, 1943	Two Tickets to London	
June 21, 1943	Get Going	
June 1943	Frontier Law	
July 9, 1943	Gals, Incorporated	
July 16, 1943	Hers to Hold	
July 23, 1943	Honeymoon Lodge	
August 6, 1943	Frontier Badmen	
August 6, 1943	The Lone Star Trail	
August 27, 1943	Phantom of the Opera	
August 30, 1943	We've Never Been Licked (Note: Owned by Paramount Pictures (via CBS))	distribution only; co-production with Walter Wanger Productions
September 1, 1943	So's Your Uncle	
September 3, 1943	Fired Wife	
September 7, 1943	Adventures of the Flying Cadets	Film serial
September 10, 1943	Larceny with Music	
September 10, 1943	The Strange Death of Adolf Hitler	
September 15, 1943	Arizona Trail	
September 17, 1943	Sherlock Holmes Faces Death	distribution only
September 17, 1943	Top Man	
September 24, 1943	Always a Bridesmaid	
September 29, 1943	Corvette K-225	
October 8, 1943	Crazy House	
October 8, 1943	Hi'ya, Sailor	
October 22, 1943	You're a Lucky Fellow, Mr. Smith	
October 29, 1943	Flesh and Fantasy	
November 5, 1943	Son of Dracula	
November 12, 1943	The Mad Ghoul	
November 19, 1943	Never a Dull Moment	
November 26, 1943	His Butler's Sister	
December 10, 1943	She's for Me	
December 17, 1943	Calling Dr. Death	
December 20, 1943	Gung Ho!	distribution only; produced by Walter Wanger Productions
December 24, 1943	Moonlight in Vermont	

== 1944 ==
Release date	Title	Notes
January 7, 1944	Sing a Jingle	
January 14, 1944	Ali Baba and the Forty Thieves	
January 21, 1944	The Spider Woman (Note: Owned by Paramount Pictures (via Melange Pictures))	distribution only
January 22, 1944	Marshal of Gunsmoke	
January 28, 1944	Phantom Lady	
February 1, 1944	Chip Off the Old Block	
February 1, 1944	Ladies Courageous	distribution only; co-production with Walter Wanger Productions
February 4, 1944	Swingtime Johnny	
February 10, 1944	The Impostor	
February 14, 1944	Week-End Pass	
March 1, 1944	Weird Woman	
March 10, 1944	Hat Check Honey	
March 17, 1944	Oklahoma Raiders	
March 22, 1944	Hi, Good Lookin'!	
March 30, 1944	Her Primitive Man	
April 1, 1944	Moon Over Las Vegas	
April 25, 1944	The Great Alaskan Mystery	Film serial
April 1944	Slightly Terrific	
May 5, 1944	Follow the Boys	
May 12, 1944	Cobra Woman	
May 21, 1944	Boss of Boomtown	
May 26, 1944	The Scarlet Claw	distribution only
May 1944	Pardon My Rhythm	
May 1944	Twilight on the Prairie	
June 1, 1944	Jungle Woman	
June 2, 1944	This Is the Life	
June 9, 1944	The Invisible Man's Revenge	
June 16, 1944	Ghost Catchers	
June 23, 1944	South of Dixie	
June 28, 1944	Christmas Holiday	
July 7, 1944	The Mummy's Ghost	
July 7, 1944	Trigger Trail	
July 21, 1944	Allergic to Love	
July 25, 1944	Raiders of Ghost City	Film serial
August 1, 1944	The Pearl of Death	distribution only
August 2, 1944	Gypsy Wildcat	
August 18, 1944	In Society	
August 18, 1944	Trail to Gunsight	
August 1944	Reckless Age	
September 8, 1944	Moonlight and Cactus	
September 15, 1944	The Merry Monahans	
September 29, 1944	San Diego, I Love You	
September 1944	The Singing Sheriff	
October 20, 1944	The Climax	
October 24, 1944	Mystery of the River Boat	Film serial
October 27, 1944	Babes on Swing Street	
October 1944	Riders of the Santa Fe	
November 3, 1944	Bowery to Broadway	
November 10, 1944	Dead Man's Eyes	
November 24, 1944	Enter Arsène Lupin	
November 1944	The Old Texas Trail	
December 1, 1944	House of Frankenstein	
December 1, 1944	Murder in the Blue Room	
December 1, 1944	My Gal Loves Music	
December 18, 1944	Hi, Beautiful	
December 22, 1944	Destiny	
December 22, 1944	The Mummy's Curse	
December 29, 1944	Can't Help Singing	

== 1945 ==
Release date	Title	Notes
January 5, 1945	Night Club Girl	
January 12, 1945	She Gets Her Man	
January 19, 1945	Under Western Skies	
January 23, 1945	Jungle Queen	Film serial
January 31, 1945	The Suspect	
February 2, 1945	Here Come the Co-Eds	
February 9, 1945	Her Lucky Night	
February 23, 1945	Frisco Sal	
March 9, 1945	See My Lawyer	
March 16, 1945	Sherlock Holmes and the House of Fear	distribution only
April 1, 1945	I'll Remember April	
April 1, 1945	Song of the Sarong	
April 17, 1945	Salome, Where She Danced	distribution only; co-production with Walter Wanger Productions
April 18, 1945	Sudan	
April 24, 1945	The Master Key	Film serial
April 27, 1945	Beyond the Pecos	
May 4, 1945	Patrick the Great	
May 11, 1945	Honeymoon Ahead	
May 18, 1945	Swing Out, Sister	
May 1945	Blonde Ransom	
June 1, 1945	The Frozen Ghost	
June 1, 1945	Renegades of the Rio Grande	
June 1, 1945	That's the Spirit	
June 1, 1945	Trail to Vengeance	
June 8, 1945	I'll Tell the World	
June 22, 1945	Penthouse Rhythm	
June 29, 1945	The Jungle Captive	
June 1945	Bad Men of the Border	
July 6, 1945	The Naughty Nineties	
July 13, 1945	On Stage Everybody	
July 20, 1945	The Beautiful Cheat	
July 24, 1945	Secret Agent X-9	Film serial
July 27, 1945	The Woman in Green	distribution only
July 1945	Code of the Lawless	
July 1945	Easy to Look At	
August 17, 1945	Lady on a Train	
August 17, 1945	The Strange Affair of Uncle Harry	distribution only; produced by Charles K. Feldman Group
September 7, 1945	Shady Lady	
September 14, 1945	Men in Her Diary	
September 21, 1945	River Gang	
September 28, 1945	That Night with You	
October 5, 1945	Strange Confession	
October 12, 1945	Senorita from the West	
October 23, 1945	The Royal Mounted Rides Again	Film serial
October 26, 1945	Pursuit to Algiers	distribution only
November 2, 1945	This Love of Ours	
November 9, 1945	The Crimson Canary	
November 23, 1945	The Daltons Ride Again	
December 7, 1945	House of Dracula	
December 13, 1945	The Demi-Paradise (Note: Owned by ITV Studios) (Note: Owned by MGM (via United Artists))	U.S. distribution
December 14, 1945	Pillow of Death	
December 21, 1945	Frontier Gal	
December 21, 1945	The Wicked Lady	
December 28, 1945	Scarlet Street	distribution only; co-production with Walter Wanger Productions, Fritz Lang Productions and Diana Productions

== 1946 ==
Release date	Title	Notes
January 11, 1946	Girl on the Spot	
January 12, 1946	The Scarlet Horseman	Film serial
January 18, 1946	Gun Town	
January 18, 1946	Because of Him	
February 1946	Smooth as Silk	
February 1, 1946	Terror by Night	distribution only
February 8, 1946	Idea Girl	
February 15, 1946	The Seventh Veil	U.S. distribution
February 22, 1946	Little Giant	
February 28, 1946	Madonna of the Seven Moons	U.S. distribution
March 1946	Blonde Alibi	
March 13, 1946	The Man in Grey	U.S. distribution
March 22, 1946	The Spider Woman Strikes Back	
March 29, 1946	House of Horrors	
April 23, 1946	Lost City of the Jungle	Film serial
April 1946	Strange Conquest	
May 1, 1946	So Goes My Love (Note: Owned by Warner Bros.)	distribution only; produced by Skirball-Manning Productions
May 3, 1946	Night in Paradise	distribution only; produced by Walter Wanger Productions
May 17, 1946	She-Wolf of London	
May 17, 1946	The Cat Creeps	
May 31, 1946	She Wrote the Book	
June 1946	Cuban Pete	
June 4, 1946	The Runaround	
June 5, 1946	Her Adventurous Night	
June 6, 1946	Tangier	
June 7, 1946	Dressed to Kill	distribution only
June 21, 1946	Lover Come Back	
June 28, 1946	Inside Job	
July 12, 1946	Danger Woman	
July 17, 1946	Canyon Passage	distribution only; produced by Walter Wanger Productions
July 29, 1946	The Dark Horse	
August 1946	Gunman's Code	
August 1946	Rustler's Round-Up	
August 1, 1946	The Mysterious Mr. M	Universal's final film serial
August 2, 1946	Black Angel	
August 2, 1946	Slightly Scandalous	
August 9, 1946	Wild Beauty	
August 16, 1946	The Time of Their Lives	
August 16, 1946	Lawless Breed	
August 24, 1946	Brief Encounter	U.S. distribution
August 30, 1946	The Killers	distribution only; produced by Mark Hellinger Productions
August 30, 1946	White Tie and Tails	
August 30, 1946	Little Miss Big	
September 20, 1946	They Were Sisters	U.S. distribution
October 18, 1946	The Dark Mirror	distribution only; produced by International Pictures
November 1946	Magnificent Doll	distribution only; produced by Hallmark Productions
December 2, 1946	Temptation	distribution only; produced by International Pictures
December 5, 1946	Swell Guy	distribution only; produced by Mark Hellinger Productions
December 25, 1946	A Matter of Life and Death (Note: Owned by Sony Pictures (via Columbia Pictures))	U.S. Distribution, retitled to Stairway to Heaven.

== 1947 ==
Release date	Title	Notes
February 2, 1947	I'll Be Yours	First official Universal-International film following International Picture's merger with Universal
February 21, 1947	The Michigan Kid	
March 1947	Song of Scheherazade	
March 1947	Smash-Up, the Story of a Woman	distribution only; co-production with Walter Wanger Productions
April 4, 1947	Buck Privates Come Home	
April 12, 1947	This Happy Breed	U.S. distribution
April 23, 1947	Odd Man Out	U.S. distribution
May 3, 1947	Time Out of Mind	
May 22, 1947	Great Expectations	Nominee of the Academy Award for Best Picture. U.S. distribution only
May 25, 1947	The Web	
May 1947	The Egg and I	
June 1, 1947	The Vigilantes Return	
June 19, 1947	A Lady Surrenders	U.S. distribution
June 26, 1947	Ivy	distribution only; co-production with Inter-Wood Productions.
July 17, 1947	Slave Girl	
July 21, 1947	Something in the Wind	
August 9, 1947	I Know Where I'm Going!	U.S. distribution
August 13, 1947	Black Narcissus	U.S. distribution
August 13, 1947	Singapore	
August 1947	Brute Force	distribution only; produced by Mark Hellinger Productions
October 8, 1947	Ride the Pink Horse	
October 8, 1947	The Wistful Widow of Wagon Gap	
October 17, 1947	The Exile	distribution only; co-production with The Fairbanks Company
November 21, 1947	The Lost Moment	distribution only; produced by Walter Wanger Productions
December 1, 1947	Pirates of Monterey	
December 24, 1947	Secret Beyond the Door	distribution only; produced by Walter Wanger Productions
December 25, 1947	A Double Life	distribution only; produced by Kanin Productions
December 26, 1947	The Senator Was Indiscreet	distribution only; produced by Nunnally Johnson Productions

== 1948 ==
Release date	Title	Notes
January 29, 1948	A Woman's Vengeance	
March 3, 1948	Black Bart	
March 4, 1948	The Naked City	distribution only; produced by Mark Hellinger Productions
March 20, 1948	Are You with It?	
April 1948	Casbah	distribution only; produced by Marston Productions
April 28, 1948	Letter from an Unknown Woman	distribution only; produced by William Dozier Productions and Rampart Productions
May 18, 1948	Another Part of the Forest	
May 26, 1948	Up in Central Park	
May 1948	All My Sons	
June 15, 1948	Abbott and Costello Meet Frankenstein	
June 1948	Feudin', Fussin' and A-Fightin'	
June 1948	River Lady	
July 1, 1948	Man-Eater of Kumaon	distribution only; produced by Shaff Productions
August 11, 1948	Mr. Peabody and the Mermaid	distribution only; produced by Nunnally Johnson Productions
August 25, 1948	Tap Roots	distribution only; produced by Walter Wanger Productions
September 1, 1948	For the Love of Mary	
September 3, 1948	Larceny	
September 28, 1948	Rogues' Regiment	
September 29, 1948	The Saxon Charm	
September 29, 1948	Hamlet	Winner of the Academy Award for Best Picture. U.S. distribution only; produced by Two Cities
October 28, 1948	One Touch of Venus	distribution only; produced by Artists Alliance
October 28, 1948	You Gotta Stay Happy	distribution only; produced by William Dozier Productions and Rampart Productions
October 30, 1948	Kiss the Blood Off My Hands	co-production with Norma Productions and Harold Hecht Productions
November 1948	The Countess of Monte Cristo	distribution only; produced by Westwood Corporation
December 5, 1948	An Act of Murder	
December 27, 1948	Mexican Hayride	

== 1949 ==
Release date	Title	Notes
February 4, 1949	Criss Cross	
February 24, 1949	Family Honeymoon	
February 27, 1949	The Fighting O'Flynn	distribution only; co-production with The Fairbanks Company
April 1, 1949	Ma and Pa Kettle	
April 7, 1949	City Across the River	
April 16, 1949	The Life of Riley	co-production with Brecher Productions
April 20, 1949	Johnny Stool Pigeon	
May 5, 1949	Red Canyon	
May 20, 1949	The Lady Gambles	
June 1, 1949	Illegal Entry	
July 16, 1949	Calamity Jane and Sam Bass	
August 14, 1949	Take One False Step	
August 22, 1949	Abbott and Costello Meet the Killer, Boris Karloff	
August 24, 1949	Sword in the Desert	
September 1949	The Gal Who Took the West	
September 14, 1949	Yes Sir, That's My Baby	
September 24, 1949	Once More, My Darling	co-production with Neptune Productions
September 24, 1949	Arctic Manhunt	
October 6, 1949	Abandoned	
November 1949	The Story of Molly X	
November 23, 1949	Bagdad	
November 25, 1949	Free for All	
December 3, 1949	Undertow	

== See also ==
- List of Focus Features films
- List of Universal Pictures theatrical animated feature films
- Universal Pictures
- Category:Lists of films by studio
