= Walter Catlett =

American actor (1889–1960)

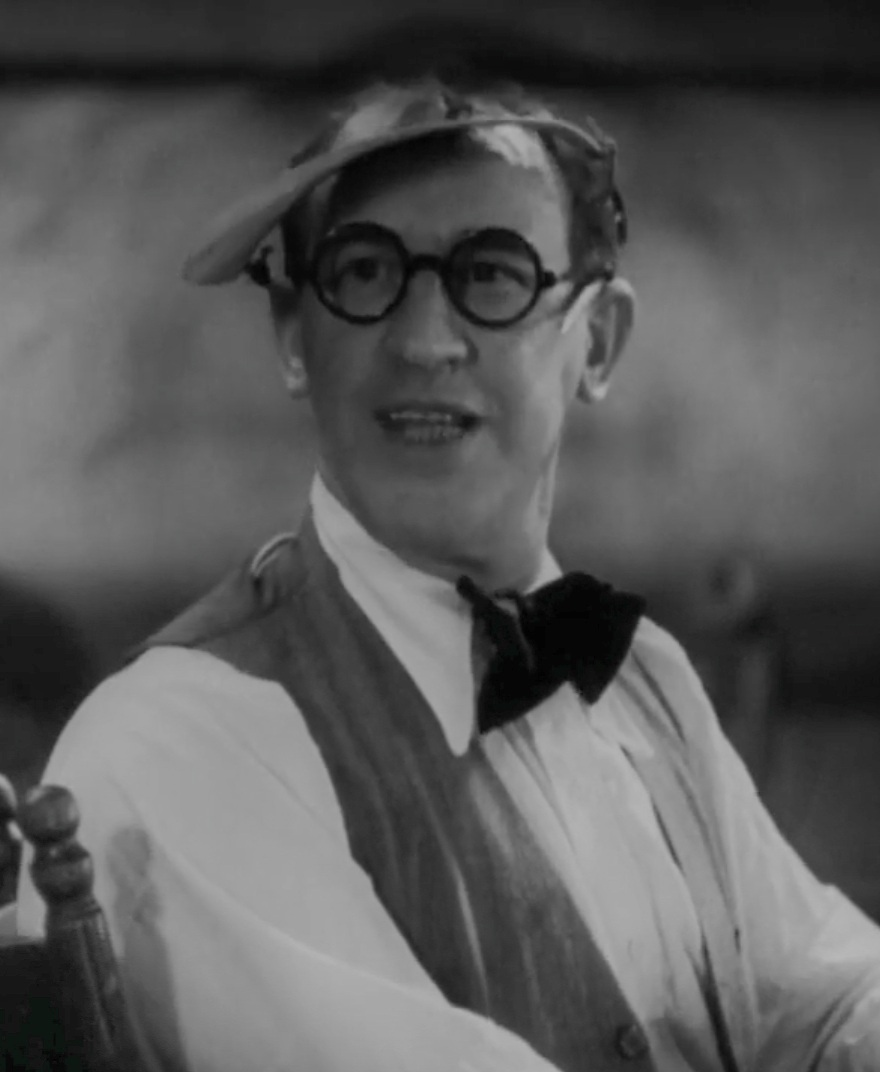
- Catlett in The Front Page (1931)
- Born: Walter Leland Catlett; February 4, 1889; San Francisco, California, U.S.
- Died: November 14, 1960 (aged 71); Woodland Hills, California, U.S.
- Resting place: Holy Cross Cemetery, Culver City, California
- Occupations: Actor; comedian
- Years active: 1906–1957
- Spouses: Zanetta Watrous (m. 1908; div. 1930) Ruth Verney (divorced): Kathlene Winifred Martyn
- Children: 1

Walter Leland Catlett (February 4, 1889 – November 14, 1960) was an American actor and comedian. He was famous for playing excitable, meddlesome, temperamental, and officious blowhards.

== Career ==
Catlett was born on February 4, 1889, in San Francisco, California.

He started out in vaudeville, teaming up with Hobart Cavanaugh at some point, with a detour for a while to opera, before breaking into acting.

He debuted on stage in 1906 and made his first Broadway appearance in either The Prince of Pilsen (1910 or 1911) or So Long Letty (1916). His first film appearance was in 1912, but then he went back to the stage and did not return to films until 1929. He performed in operettas and musicals, including The Ziegfeld Follies of 1917, the original production of the Jerome Kern musical Sally (1920) and the Gershwins' Lady, Be Good (1924). In the last, he introduced the song "Oh, Lady Be Good!" In 1918, he starred in, stage-managed and rewrote an Oliver Morosco-Elmer Harris-Harry Plani production titled Look Pleasant, playing at the Majestic Theatre in Los Angeles. His antics in the musical Baby Bunting in London in 1922 had King George V laughing "uproariously".

Catlett made a handful of silent film appearances, but his film career did not catch on until the advent of talking pictures allowed moviegoers to experience his full comic repertoire. He starred in a number of 'two-reelers', mostly in the 1930s, some as a comedy duo with Eugene Pallette, for RKO; most were for RKO, but six were for Columbia between 1934 and 1940.

Three of his better remembered roles were perhaps as the theatre manager driven to distraction by James Cagney's character in Yankee Doodle Dandy, the local constable who throws the entire cast in jail and winds up there himself in the Howard Hawks classic screwball comedy Bringing Up Baby, and as Morrow, the drunken poet in the restaurant who "knows when [he's] been a skunk" and takes Longfellow Deeds on a "bender" in Mr. Deeds Goes to Town. He was also widely reported to have been Katharine Hepburn's comedy coach while filming Bringing Up Baby. The New York Times film critic Mordaunt Hall wrote that "This clever comedian runs away with the acting laurels" in Big City Blues (1932). He played John Barsad in the 1935 David O. Selznick production of A Tale of Two Cities, starring Ronald Colman. He also provided the uncredited voice of J. Worthington Foulfellow (a.k.a. Honest John) the Fox, the main antagonist in Walt Disney's 1940 animated film Pinocchio. In the 1950s, he appeared in films like Here Comes the Groom, Friendly Persuasion, and Beau James.

For his contributions to the film industry, Catlett was inducted into the Hollywood Walk of Fame on February 8, 1960, with a motion pictures star located at 1713 Vine Street.

== Death ==
Catlett died of a stroke on November 14, 1960, at the age of 71, in Woodland Hills, California. He was interred in Holy Cross Cemetery, Culver City, California.

== Filmography ==
- Second Youth (1924) as John McNab
- Summer Bachelors (1926) as Bachelor No. 1
- The Music Master (1927) as Medicine Show Barker
- Why Leave Home? (1929) as Elmer
- Married in Hollywood (1929) as Joe Glitner
- Happy Days (1929) as End Man - Minstrel Show
- Let's Go Places (1930) as Rex Wardell
- The Big Party (1930) as Mr. Goldfarb
- The Golden Calf (1930) as Master of Ceremonies
- The Florodora Girl (1930) as De Boer
- The Front Page (1931) as Murphy
- Honeymoon Trio (1931 short) as The Nuisance
- One Quiet Night (1931 short)
- Platinum Blonde (1931) as Bingy
- Maker of Men (1931) as McNeil
- Cock of the Air (1932) as Col. Wallace
- Sky Devils (1932) as Master of Ceremonies - Canteen Show (uncredited)
- The Expert (1932) as Al
- It's Tough to Be Famous (1932) as Joseph Craig 'Joe' Chapin
- Back Street (1932) as Bakeless
- Okay, America! (1932) as City Editor aka 'Lucille'
- Big City Blues (1932) as Cousin 'Gibby' Gibboney
- Rain (1932) as Quartermaster Bates
- The Sport Parade (1932) as 'Shifty' Morrison
- Rockabye (1932) as Jimmy Dunn
- Olsen's Big Moment (1933) as Robert Brewster III
- Private Jones (1933) as Spivey
- Private Wives (1933) Walter Catlett two-reeler, as Walter
- Hunting Trouble (1933) Walter Catlett two-reeler, as Walter
- Caliente Love (1933) Walter Catlett two-reeler, as Harrison
- Dream Stuff (1933) Walter Catlett two-reeler, as Cousin Walter
- Road Queen (1933) Walter Catlett two-reeler, as Walter Knox
- Daddy Knows Best (1933) Walter Catlett two-reeler, as Mr. Boyce
- Husbands' Reunion (1933) Walter Catlett two-reeler, as Walter
- The Big Fibber (1933) Walter Catlett two-reeler, as Walter Moore
- Meet The Champ (1933) Eugene Pallette and Walter Catlett two-reeler; as himself
- Sailors Beware (1933) Eugene Pallette and Walter Catlett two-reeler; as Smitty
- One Awful Night (1933) Eugene Pallette and Walter Catlett two-reeler; as himself
- So This Is Harris (1933, Oscar winner for Best Short Subject) Phil Harris three-reeler co-starring Walter Catlett as himself
- Mama Loves Papa (1933) as Tom Walker
- Arizona to Broadway (1933) as Ned Flynn
- Only Yesterday (1933) as Barnes (uncredited)
- Gold Nuggets (1933) Walter Catlett two-reeler; as himself
- Elmer Steps Out (1934. Columbia) Walter Catlett two-reeler; as Elmer
- Get Along Little Hubby (1934, Columbia) Walter Catlett two-reeler; as Elmer Tuttle
- The New Dealers (1934) Eugene Pallette and Walter Catlett two-reeler; as himself
- News Hounds (1934) Eugene Pallette and Walter Catlett two-reeler; as himself
- Making the Rounds (1934) Eugene Pallette and Walter Catlett two-reeler; as himself
- The Fuller Gush Man (1934) Walter Catlett two-reeler; as Harry Judson
- Old Maid's Mistake (1934) Walter Catlett two-reeler; as himself
- Unknown Blonde (1934) as Publicity Man
- The Captain Hates the Sea (1934) as Joe Silvers
- Lightning Strikes Twice (1934) as Gus
- Every Night at Eight (1935) as Master of Ceremonies
- The Affair of Susan (1935) as Gilbert
- In the Sweet Bye and Bye (1935) Walter Catlett two-reeler; as Elmer
- A Tale of Two Cities (1935) as Barsad
- Mr. Deeds Goes to Town (1936) as Morrow, the Poet
- We Went to College (1936) as Senator Budger
- Follow Your Heart (1936) as Joe Sheldon
- Cain and Mabel (1936) as Jake Sherman
- Four Days' Wonder (1936) as Duffy
- Banjo on My Knee (1936) as Warfield Scott
- Sing Me a Love Song (1936) as Mr. Sprague (uncredited)
- I Loved a Soldier (1936)
- Fibbing Fibbers (1936, Columbia) Walter Catlett two-reeler; as himself
- Upper Cutlets (1936, aka Uppercutlets) Walter Catlett two-reeler; as himself
- On the Avenue (1937) as Jake Dibble
- Love Is News (1937) as Eddie Johnson
- Wake Up and Live (1937) as Gus Avery
- Love Under Fire (1937) as Tip Conway
- Varsity Show (1937) as Professor Sylvester Biddle
- Danger – Love at Work (1937) as Uncle Alan
- Every Day's a Holiday (1937) as Nifty Bailey
- Come Up Riches (1937)
- Bringing Up Baby (1938) as Slocum
- Zaza (1938) as Marlardot
- Going Places (1938) as Franklin Dexter
- Exile Express (1939) as Gus
- Kid Nightingale (1939) as Skip Davis
- Static in the Attic (1939, Columbia) Walter Catlett two-reeler; as himself
- Pinocchio (1940) as Honest John Worthington Foulfellow (uncredited voice)
- Half a Sinner (1940) as Station Attendant
- Pop Always Pays (1940) as Tommy Lane
- Comin' Round the Mountain (1940) as W.P.A. Clerk
- Spring Parade (1940) as Headwaiter
- The Quarterback (1940) as Tom
- Li'l Abner (1940) as Barber
- You're Next! (1940) Walter Catlett two-reeler; as Slocum
- Alex In Wonderland (1940) Walter Catlett two-reeler; as Fred
- Blondes and Blunders (1940) Walter Catlett two-reeler; as himself
- Remedy for Riches (1940) as Clem
- Honeymoon for Three (1941) as Waiter
- The Wild Man of Borneo (1941) as 'Doc' Skelby
- You're the One (1941) as Program Director
- Horror Island (1941) as Sergeant McGoon
- Million Dollar Baby (1941) as Mr. Simpson
- Hello, Sucker (1941) as G. Remington 'Max' Conway
- Bad Men of Missouri (1941) as Mr. Pettibone
- Manpower (1941) as Sidney Whipple
- Unfinished Business (1941) as Billy Ross
- Sing Another Chorus (1941) as Theodore Gateson
- It Started with Eve (1941) as Doctor Harvey
- Steel Against the Sky (1941) as Professor Rupert Sampson
- Wild Bill Hickok Rides (1942) as Sylvester W. Twigg
- Star Spangled Rhythm (1942) as Walter
- My Gal Sal (1942) as Col. Truckee
- Syncopation (1942) as Spelvin
- Yankee Doodle Dandy (1942) as Theatre Manager
- Maisie Gets Her Man (1942) as Jasper
- Give Out, Sisters (1942) as Gribble
- Between Us Girls (1942) as Desk Sergeant
- Heart of the Golden West (1942) as Colonel Silas Popen
- How's About It (1943) as Whipple
- They Got Me Covered (1943) as Hotel Manager
- Hit Parade of 1943 (1943) as J. MacClellan Davis
- Cowboy in Manhattan (1943) as Ace Robbins
- Get Going (1943) as Horace Doblem
- The West Side Kid (1943) as Ramsey Fensel
- Fired Wife (1943) as Judge Allen
- His Butler's Sister (1943) as Mortimer Kalb
- Up in Arms (1944) as Major Brock
- Hat Check Honey (1944) as Tim Martel
- Her Primitive Man (1944) as Hotel Clerk
- Lady, Let's Dance (1944) as Timber Applegate
- Pardon My Rhythm (1944) as O'Bannion
- Ghost Catchers (1944) as Colonel Breckinridge Marshall
- Three Is a Family (1944) as Barney Meeker
- My Gal Loves Music (1944) as Dr. Bilbo
- Hi, Beautiful (1944) as Gerald Bisbee
- Lake Placid Serenade (1944) as Carlton Webb
- The Man Who Walked Alone (1945) as Wiggins
- I Love a Bandleader (1945) as B. Templeton James
- Riverboat Rhythm (1946) as Colonel Jeffrey "Smitty" Witherspoon
- Slightly Scandalous (1946) as Mr. Wright
- I'll Be Yours (1947) as Mr. Buckingham
- Are You with It? (1948) as Jason (Pop) Carter
- Mr. Reckless (1948) as Joel Hawkins
- The Boy with Green Hair (1948) as The King
- Henry, the Rainmaker (1949) as Mayor Colton
- Leave It to Henry (1949) as Mayor Colton
- Look for the Silver Lining (1949) as himself
- Dancing in the Dark (1949) as Joe Brooks
- The Inspector General (1949) as Colonel Castine
- Father Makes Good (1950) as Mayor George Colton
- Father's Wild Game (1950) as Mayor George Colton
- Father Takes the Air (1951) as Mayor George Colton
- Here Comes the Groom (1951) as Mr. McGonigle
- Honeychile (1951) as Al Moore
- Davy Crockett and the River Pirates (1956) as Colonel Plug (archive footage)
- Friendly Persuasion (1956) as Professor Quigley
- The Gay Nineties (1956)
- Beau James (1957) as Gov. Alfred E. "Al" Smith

== Broadway stage credits ==
- So Long Letty (1916–1917)
- Ziegfeld Follies of 1917 (1917)
- Follow the Girl (1918)
- Sally (1920–1922, 1923)
- Dear Sir (1924)
- Lady, Be Good (1924–1925)
- Lucky (1927)
- Treasure Girl (1928)
