= Half a Sinner =

Half a Sinner may refer to:

- Half a Sinner (1934 film), an American film directed by Kurt Neumann
- Half a Sinner (1940 film), an American film directed by Al Christie
