= Oscar O'Shea =

Canadian-American actor

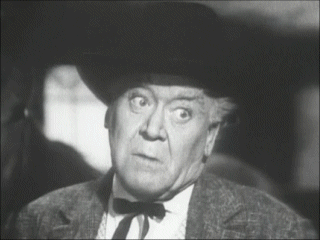
- O'Shea in The Bashful Bachelor (1942)
- Born: October 8, 1881; Peterborough, Ontario, Canada
- Died: April 6, 1960 (aged 78); Hollywood, California, U.S.
- Occupation: Actor
- Years active: 1937–1953

Oscar O'Shea (8 October 1881 – 6 April 1960) was a Canadian-American character actor with over 100 film appearances from 1937 to 1953.

== Early years ==
O'Shea was born in Peterborough, Ontario, Canada.

== Acting ==
O'Shea was a comic actor who earned a million dollars but lost it all in the Great Depression. His first straight role came in a Federal Theatre Project production of It Can't Happen Here, a play based on the novel of the same name.

O'Shea's first film was Captains Courageous (1937).

== Management ==
Beginning in 1929, O'Shea operated the Oscar O'Shea Players repertory theater company in the Embassy Theatre in Ottawa, Canada. He eventually ended the enterprise "to seek a field where his art would be more widely appreciated." He then set up an operation in Chicago, "where he managed his own theatre and stock company during good and bad years."

== Death ==
O'Shea died in Hollywood, California, in 1960 at age 78.

== Selected filmography ==
- The Good Old Soak (1937) as Jake (uncredited)
- Captains Courageous (1937) as Captain Walt Cushman
- Big City (1937) as John C. Andrews
- Double Wedding (1937) as Turnkey (uncredited)
- Thoroughbreds Don't Cry (1937) as Man Seated Next to Wilkins (uncredited)
- You're Only Young Once (1937) as Sheriff (uncredited)
- Mannequin (1937) as 'Pa' Cassidy
- Rosalie (1937) as Mr. Callahan
- Man-Proof (1938) as Gus
- Love Is a Headache (1938) as Pop Sheeman, Stage Doorman (uncredited)
- Border Wolves (1938) as Judge Coleman
- King of the Newsboys (1938) as Mr. Stephens
- International Crime (1938) as Heath
- Hold That Kiss (1938) as Pop, Man Bringing Usher's Clothes (uncredited)
- Numbered Woman (1938)
- The Main Event (1938) as Captain Rorty
- Rebellious Daughters (1938) as Dad Elliott
- Racket Busters (1938) as Pop Wilson
- Youth Takes a Fling (1938) as Captain Walters
- Stablemates (1938) as Pete Whalen
- The Shining Hour (1938) as Charlie Collins
- Angels with Dirty Faces (1938) as Kennedy (uncredited)
- King of the Turf (1939) as Bartender
- Love Affair (1939) as Priest (uncredited)
- Undercover Agent (1939) as Pat Murphy
- Big Town Czar (1939) as Pa Daley
- Lucky Night (1939) as Police Lieutenant
- Tell No Tales (1939) as Sam O'Neil
- S.O.S. Tidal Wave (1939) as Mike Halloran
- Invitation to Happiness (1939) as Divorce Judge
- She Married a Cop (1939) as Pa Duffy
- The Star Maker (1939) as Mr. Flannigan
- Those High Grey Walls (1939) as Warden
- The Roaring Twenties (1939) as Customer (uncredited)
- Missing Evidence (1939) as John C. 'Pop' Andrews
- The Night of Nights (1939) as Mr. Conway (uncredited)
- Of Mice and Men (1939) as Jackson
- I Take This Woman (1940) as Dowling (scenes deleted)
- Zanzibar (1940) as Captain Craig
- Forty Little Mothers (1940) as Janitor at Train Station (uncredited)
- 20 Mule Team (1940) as Train Conductor
- You Can't Fool Your Wife (1940) as Dr. Emery, Colony College Chaplain
- Susan and God (1940) as Samr (uncredited)
- Pier 13 (1940) as Skipper Kelly
- Stranger on the Third Floor (1940) as The Judge
- Wildcat Bus (1940) as Charles Dawson
- The Bride Wore Crutches (1940) as Pop (uncredited)
- Always a Bride (1940) as Uncle Dan Jarvis
- The Phantom Submarine (1940) as Captain Velsar
- Four Mothers (1941) as George Edwards (uncredited)
- Sleepers West (1941) as Engineer McGowan
- Mutiny in the Arctic (1941) as Capt. Bob Morrissey
- Blossoms in the Dust (1941) as Dr. West (uncredited)
- Accent on Love (1941) as Magistrate
- Ringside Maisie (1941) as Conductor
- Harmon of Michigan (1941) as 'Pop' Branch
- Lydia (1941) as Doctor Richards (uncredited)
- Riders of the Purple Sage (1941) as Noah Judkins
- The Officer and the Lady (1941) as Dan Regan
- Fly-by-Night (1942) as Pa Prescott
- Torpedo Boat (1942) as Captain Mike
- The Bashful Bachelor (1942) as Squire Skimp
- I Was Framed (1942) as Cal Beamish
- The Postman Didn't Ring (1942) as Judge Barrington
- Just Off Broadway (1942) as Pop
- Halfway to Shanghai (1942) as Doctor McIntyre
- Sin Town (1942) as Train Conductor (uncredited)
- Henry Aldrich, Editor (1942) as Judge Sanders
- Lady Bodyguard (1943) as Justice of the Peace (uncredited)
- City Without Men (1943) as Joseph Barton
- Two Weeks to Live (1943) as Squire Skimp (uncredited)
- Good Morning, Judge (1943) as Magistrate
- Three Hearts for Julia (1943) as Stage Doorman (uncredited)
- Two Tickets to London (1943) as Mr. Tinkle
- Gals, Incorporated (1943) as Justice (uncredited)
- The Good Fellows (1943) as Great Grand Caesar (uncredited)
- Corvette K-225 (1943) as Capt. Smith (uncredited)
- Happy Land (1943) as Father Case (uncredited)
- Her Primitive Man (1944) as Jonathan
- South of Dixie (1944) as Col. Hatcher
- The Mummy's Ghost (1944) as Watchman
- Haunted Harbor (1944, Serial) as John Galbraith [Chs. 1, 7, 15]
- Mystery of the River Boat (1944, Serial) as Capt. Ethan Perrin
- Here Come the Waves (1944) as Commodore (uncredited)
- Bewitched (1945) as Capt. O'Malley
- Senorita from the West (1945) as Dusty
- Without Reservations (1946) as Conductor (uncredited)
- Personality Kid (1946) as Officer O'Brien
- The Brute Man (1946) as Mr. Haskins, Grocer (uncredited)
- Abie's Irish Rose (1946) as Bishop (uncredited)
- Stallion Road (1947) as Doc Brady, DVM (uncredited)
- Sport of Kings (1947) as Judge Sellers
- Where There's Life (1947) as Uncle Philip (uncredited)
- It Had to Be You (1947) as Irish Neighborhood Watchman (scenes deleted)
- My Wild Irish Rose (1947) as Pat Daly
- Fury at Furnace Creek (1948) as Jailer (uncredited)
- One Sunday Afternoon (1948) as Toby
- The Daughter of Rosie O'Grady (1950) as Mr. Flannigan (uncredited)
- Thy Neighbor's Wife (1953) (final film role)
