= Grace McDonald =

American actress (1918–1999)

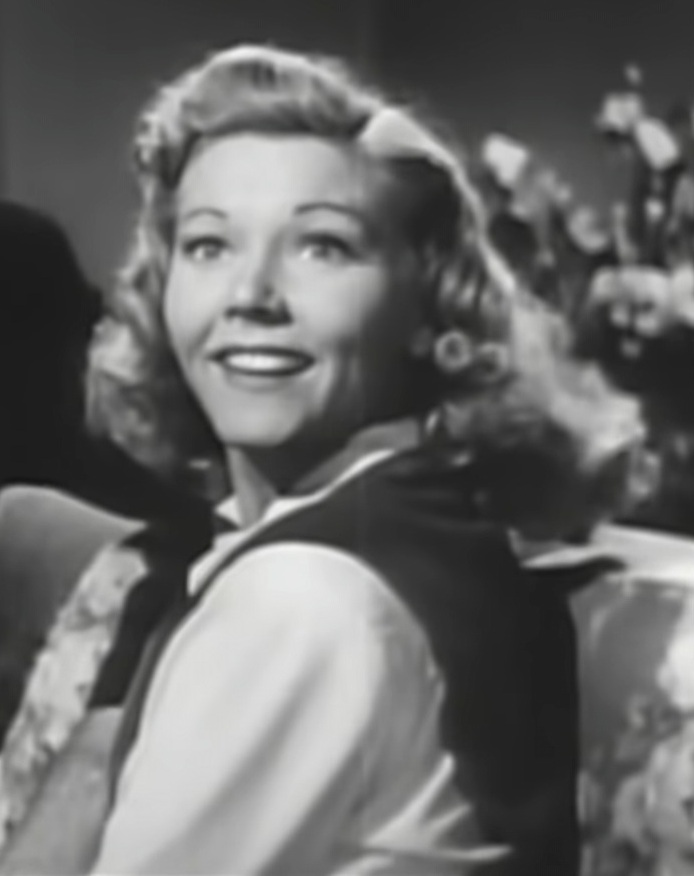
- McDonald in Gung Ho! (1943)
- Born: June 15, 1918; New York City, U.S.
- Died: October 30, 1999 (aged 81); Scottsdale, Arizona, U.S.
- Occupation: Actress
- Years active: 1936–1967
- Spouse: Lt. Ralph Green (m. 1944)
- Children: 3
- Relatives: Ray McDonald (brother)

Grace McDonald Green (June 15, 1918 – October 30, 1999) was an American actress who appeared in films in the early 1940s, mostly B movies.

== Early life ==
Born in New York City, she and her brother Ray McDonald had their Broadway debut in 1937 in Babes in Arms as part of the dance team and singing "I Wish I Were in Love Again". Other Broadway plays in which she performed included One for the Money (1939), Very Warm for May (1939), and The More the Merrier (1941).

== Career ==
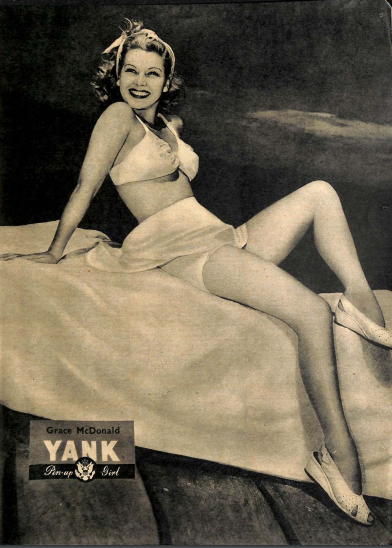
Pin-up photo of McDonald for Yank, the Army Weekly in 1943

McDonald's work in Babes in Arms led to a film contract with Universal Pictures. She made her screen debut in 1940's Dancing on a Dime, and appeared in Give Out, Sisters (1942), It Ain't Hay (1943), Destiny (1944), See My Lawyer (1945), and Strictly in the Groove in 1942.

McDonald also performed in vaudeville. During World War II, she participated in publicity campaigns related to gasoline rationing, donations of books for military personnel, saving cooking fat for military use, rag salvage, and other public-service activities. She also worked as a hostess at the Hollywood Canteen and entertained troops during tours of Army camps.

== Personal life ==
In late 1944 she married Lt. Ralph Green and moved to Minneapolis in 1947, leaving Hollywood behind, and eventually having three children. She died of pneumonia in Scottsdale, Arizona on October 30, 1999.

== Filmography ==
Year	Title	Role	Notes
1940	Dancing on a Dime	Lorie Fenton	
1942	What's Cookin'?	Angela	
1942	Give Out, Sisters	Gracie Waverly	
1942	Strictly in the Groove	Dixie	
1942	Behind the Eight Ball	Babs	
1942	Mug Town	Norene Steward	
1943	How's About It	Marion Bliss	
1943	It Ain't Hay	Kitty McGloin	
1943	Get Going	Judy King	
1943	Gals, Incorporated	Molly	
1943	Always a Bridesmaid	Linda Mae Perkins	
1943	Crazy House	Herself	Uncredited
1943	Flesh and Fantasy	Gaspar's Partner	Uncredited
1943	She's for Me	Jan Lawton	
1943	Gung Ho	Kathleen Corrigan	
1944	Hat Check Honey	Susan Brent	
1944	Follow the Boys	Kitty West	
1944	Murder in the Blue Room	Peggy	
1944	My Gal Loves Music	Judy Mason	
1944	Destiny	Betty	
1945	See My Lawyer	Betty Wilson	
1945	Honeymoon Ahead	Evelyn	(final film role)
