= I Hear Music =

"I Hear Music" is a popular song composed by Burton Lane, with lyrics by Frank Loesser for the Paramount Pictures movie Dancing on a Dime (1940). In the film it was performed by Robert Paige, Peter Lind Hayes, Frank Jenks and Eddie Quillan.

== Notable recordings ==
- Billie Holiday - Okeh 5831 (recorded September 12, 1940)
- Irene Daye with Gene Krupa - Okeh 5802 (recorded September 17, 1940)
- Nat King Cole - The Piano Style of Nat King Cole (1956) (non vocal)
- Blossom Dearie - Blossom Dearie (1957)
- Peggy Lee - Jump for Joy (1959)
- Ella Fitzgerald - Ella Swings Brightly with Nelson (1962), Ella and Oscar (1975)
- Bing Crosby - Bing Crosby's Treasury - The Songs I Love (1968 version)
- Sue Raney - Sue Raney Volume II (2004)
