= Honeymoon Ahead =

1945 film directed by Reginald LeBorg

- Theatrical release poster
- Directed by: Reginald LeBorg
- Screenplay by: Val Burton; Elwood Ullman
- Story by: Val Burton
- Produced by: Will Cowan
- Starring: Allan Jones; Grace McDonald; Raymond Walburn; Vivian Austin; Jack Overman; Murray Alper
- Cinematography: Paul Ivano; Charles Van Enger
- Edited by: Ted J. Kent
- Music by: Frank Skinner
- Production company: Universal Pictures
- Distributed by: Universal Pictures
- Release date: May 11, 1945
- Running time: 60 minutes
- Country: United States
- Language: English

Honeymoon Ahead is a 1945 American comedy film directed by Reginald LeBorg and written by Val Burton and Elwood Ullman. The film stars Allan Jones, Grace McDonald, Raymond Walburn, Vivian Austin, Jack Overman and Murray Alper. The film was released on May 11, 1945, by Universal Pictures.

== Cast ==
- Allan Jones as Orpheus
- Grace McDonald as Evelyn Mack
- Raymond Walburn as Rollie Mack
- Vivian Austin as Rosita
- Jack Overman as Knuckles
- Murray Alper as Spike
- Eddie Acuff as Connors
- John Abbott as Welles
- William Haade as Trigger
- Arthur Loft as Sheriff Weeks
- Ralph Peters as George
- Charles F. Miller as Ephraim
- Sarah Padden as Mrs. Halett
- Jack Rube Clifford as Gus
