= Dancing on a Dime =

1940 film by Joseph Santley

- Directed by: Joseph Santley
- Written by: Maurice Rapf; Anne Morrison Chapin; Allen Rivkin
- Produced by: A.M. Botsford
- Cinematography: Charles Lang
- Edited by: Doane Harrison
- Music by: Victor Young
- Production company: Paramount Pictures
- Distributed by: Paramount Pictures
- Release date: November 1, 1940 (United States)
- Running time: 74 minutes
- Country: United States
- Language: English

Dancing on a Dime is a 1940 Paramount Pictures film directed by Joseph Santley about five actors and dancers putting on a show while living in a theatre. It is adapted from a novel of the same name written by Dorothy Young, which itself is based loosely on her own life. It starred Robert Paige, Peter Lind Hayes, Eddie Quillan, Frank Jenks, and Grace McDonald. It is known for its song, I Hear Music.

== Songs ==
- "Dancing on a Dime", music by Burton Lane, lyrics by Frank Loesser, sung by Grace McDonald and Robert Paige (neither credited)
- "Debutante Number One", music by Victor Young, lyrics by Frank Loesser
- "I Hear Music", music by Burton Lane, lyrics by Frank Loesser, sung by Robert Paige, Peter Lind Hayes, Frank Jenks and Eddie Quillan (none credited)
- "Mañana", music by Burton Lane, lyrics by Frank Loesser
- "Lovable Sort of Person", music by Victor Young, lyrics by Frank Loesser
