= See My Lawyer =

1945 film directed by Edward F. Cline

- Theatrical release poster
- Directed by: Edward F. Cline
- Screenplay by: Edmund Hartmann; Stanley Davis
- Based on: See My Lawyer by: Richard Maibaum; Harry Clork
- Produced by: Edmund Hartmann
- Starring: Ole Olsen; Chic Johnson; Alan Curtis; Grace McDonald; Noah Beery Jr. Franklin Pangborn; Edward Brophy
- Cinematography: Paul Ivano
- Edited by: Paul Landres
- Production company: Universal Pictures
- Distributed by: Universal Pictures
- Release date: March 9, 1945
- Running time: 67 minutes
- Country: United States
- Language: English

See My Lawyer is a 1945 American comedy film directed by Edward F. Cline and written by Edmund Hartmann and Stanley Davis. It is based on the 1939 musical See My Lawyer by Richard Maibaum and Harry Clork. The film stars Ole Olsen, Chic Johnson, Alan Curtis, Grace McDonald, Noah Beery Jr., Franklin Pangborn, and Edward Brophy. The film was released on March 9, 1945, by Universal Pictures.

== Plot ==
Comedians Olsen and Johnson are under contract as the resident headliners at B. J. Wagonhorn's nightclub, so they can't accept a movie offer from Hollywood. A struggling law firm convinces them to break their nightclub contract. The comedians hire stooges to pose as the club's customers, who will be insulted and abused by Olsen and Johnson's slapstick antics. These "customers" file 39 phony lawsuits against Wagonhorn, and in desperation he sells the nightclub to Olsen and Johnson. The stratagem backfires, however, when a genuine lawsuit is filed against Olsen and Johnson. The case is tried in a courtroom, but is decided on the scene at Olsen & Johnson's nightclub.

== Cast ==
- Ole Olsen as Ole
- Chic Johnson as Chic
- Alan Curtis as Charlie Rodman, attorney
- Grace McDonald as Betty Wilson
- Noah Beery Jr. as Arthur Lane, attorney
- Franklin Pangborn as B. J. Wagonhorn
- Edward Brophy as Otis Fillmore, process server
- Richard Benedict as Joe Wilson, attorney
- Lee Patrick as Sally Evans
- Gus Schilling as J. Ambrose (Winky) Winkler
- William B. Davidson as Judge
- Stanley Clements as Willie
- Mary Gordon as Mrs. Fillmore
- Ralph Peters as O'Brien
- Carmen Amaya as herself
- Yvette (Elsa Harris Silver) as Specialty Singer
- Nat King Cole as himself (in The King Cole Trio)
- Vernon Dent as Nightclub Patron

== Production ==
See My Lawyer was the last of four Olsen & Johnson features produced by Universal Pictures. The first two films were among the studio's costliest productions, so Universal economized on the last two. See My Lawyer is the most economical of all, with Olsen and Johnson absent from much of the action and the bulk of the film consisting of vaudeville and specialty acts. (One number is actually old material, originally filmed in 1943 for the Ritz Brothers comedy Never a Dull Moment.) Olsen & Johnson's limited footage was actually viewed as an asset by trade reviewer Pete Harrison: "This time the two comedians have wisely refrained from dominating the proceedings, with the result that the picture is a decided improvement over their last two efforts."

== Reception ==
Olsen and Johnson's very broad comedy had always been a matter of taste, as Independent Film Bulletin explained: "As always, the middle-aged comics fall back on the corniest gags -- mud or custard pies thrown in the face, seltzer water squirted on indignant folk, dresses ripped off lovely girls, and plenty of screaming and shooting of cap pistols -- a brand of humor which many patrons abhor but plenty of others delight in. The film starts out with a semblance of plot, based on the well-known stage play, but this is later forgotten for long stretches... Laughter was plentiful in a New York naborhood [sic] house where this was billed above the main feature, Guest in the House." Photoplay columnist Sara Hamilton liked the stars but not the picture: "It was a long, dry spell between laughs, believe us. Too bad, too, because no one can be funnier than Ole Olsen and Chic Johnson with the right material. Another like this and they'll see my lawyer."

See My Lawyer was reissued by Realart Pictures in 1952 under a new title, In a Padded Cell. This was in reference to one of Olsen & Johnson's old radio routines, "The Padded Cell of the Air."
