= Neely Edwards =

American actor

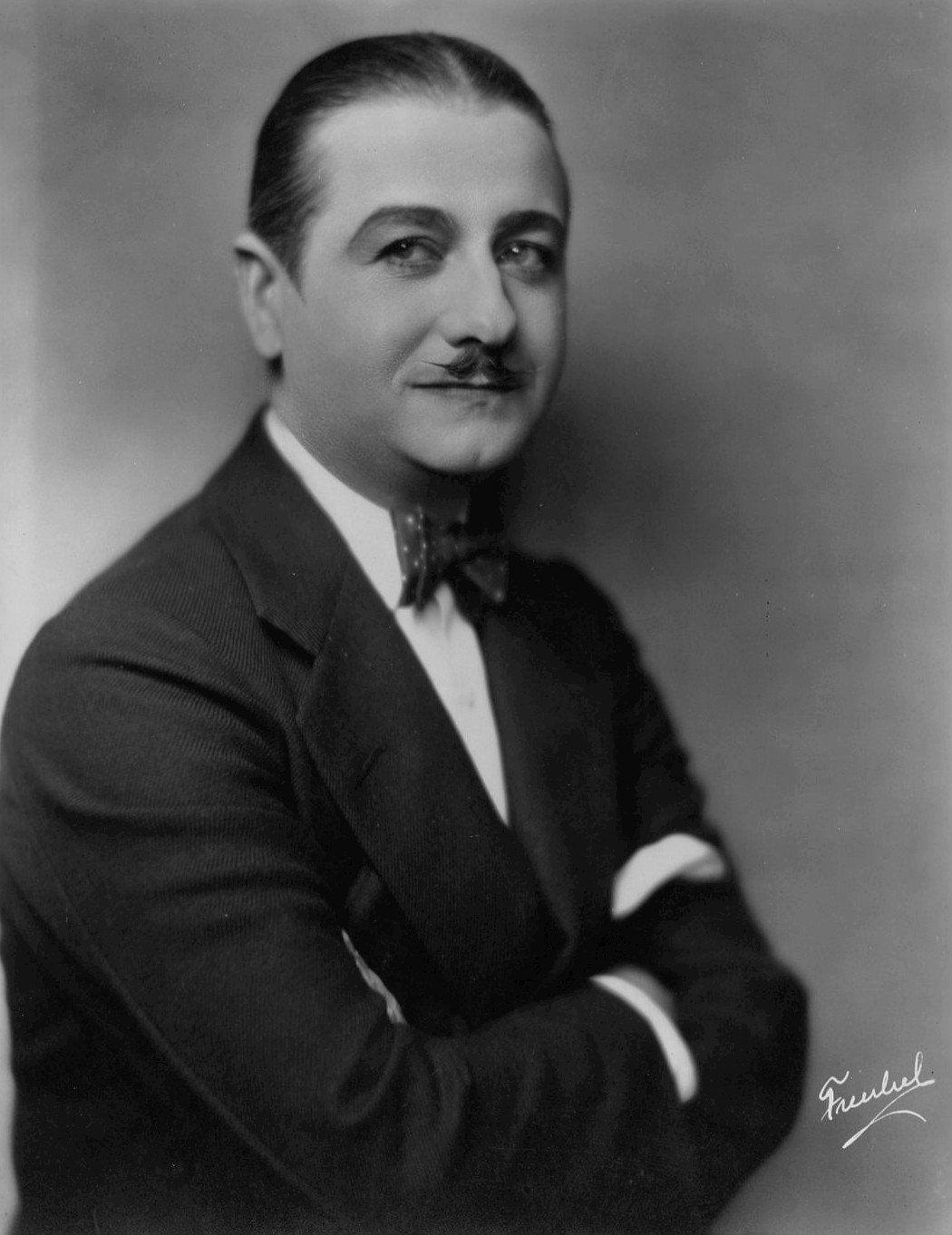
- in 1934
- Born: Cornelius Limbach; September 16, 1883; Delphos, Ohio, U.S.
- Died: July 10, 1965 (aged 81); Woodland Hills, Los Angeles, U.S.
- Years active: 1915-1959

Neely Edwards (born Cornelius Limbach; September 16, 1883 – July 10, 1965) was an American vaudeville performer and film actor.

== Biography ==
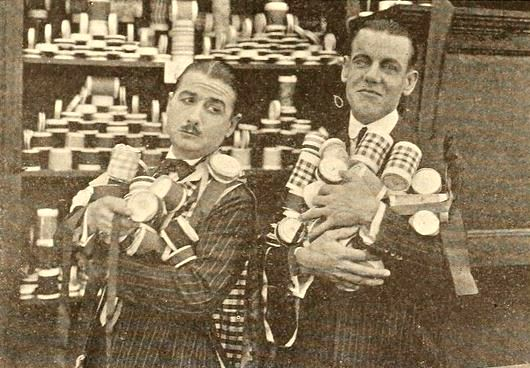
Neely Edwards (left) and Edward Flanagan in a "Hall Room Boys" comedy short

Edwards appeared in 174 films between 1915 and 1959. The first was as an unbilled player in a Harold Lloyd short.

In the early 1920s Edwards and his vaudeville partner Edward Flanagan appeared as the "Hall Room Boys" in some of the earliest short films produced by Cohn-Brandt-Cohn Film Sales, which would develop into Columbia Pictures. Of his credited film appearances, about 140 are comedy short subjects, notably the "Nervy Ned" one-reelers made for Universal Pictures from 1922 to 1924, in which he and Bert Roach played a couple of hoboes who typically get into slapstick trouble.

His later career is marked by bit parts and character work. Edwards was married to actress Marguerite Snow. He was born in Delphos, Ohio, and died in Woodland Hills, Los Angeles.

== Vaudeville farces and skits ==
- "Off and On" - skit of stage life 1917

== Partial filmography ==
- The Hungry Actors (1915)
- You Never Can Tell (1920)
- The Little Clown (1920)
- Brewster's Millions (1921)
- The Green Temptation (1922)
- Made for Love (1926)
- Footloose Widows (1926)
- The Princess on Broadway (1927)
- Show Boat (1929)
- Gold Diggers of Broadway (1929)
- Dynamite (1929)
- Scarlet Pages (1930)
- Love, Honor, and Oh Baby! (1933)
- Strictly in the Groove (1942)
- Hat Check Honey (1944)
- Patrick the Great (1945)
