= Cain and Mabel =

1936 film by Lloyd Bacon

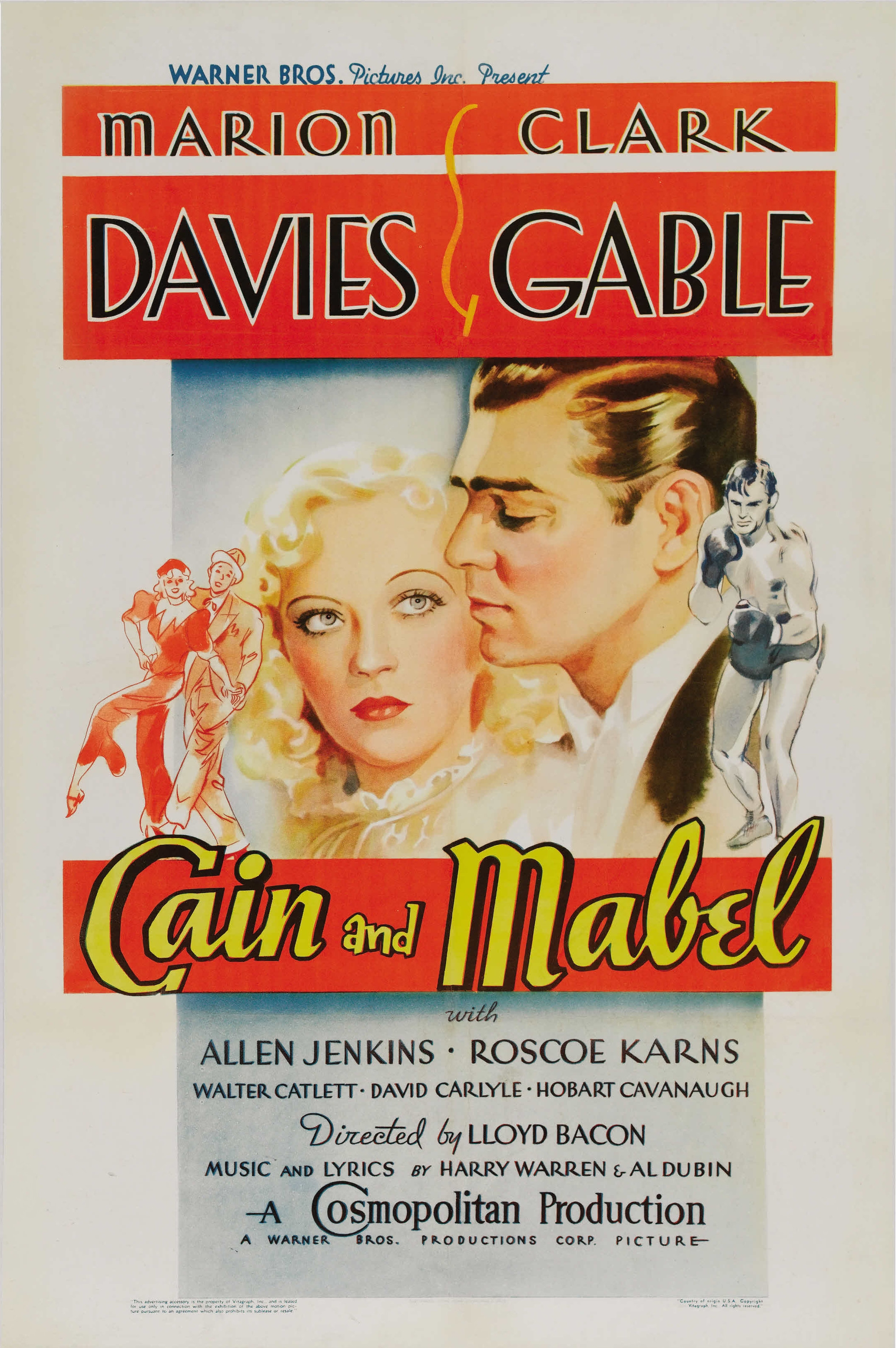
- Film poster
- Directed by: Lloyd Bacon
- Screenplay by: Laird Doyle
- Story by: H.C. Witwer
- Produced by: Hal B. Wallis; Jack L. Warner
- Starring: Marion Davies; Clark Gable; Allen Jenkins; Robert Paige
- Cinematography: George Barnes
- Edited by: William Holmes
- Music by: Songs: Harry Warren (music); Al Dubin (lyrics); Score: Bernhard Kaun; Heinz Roemheld (both uncredited)
- Production company: Cosmopolitan Pictures
- Distributed by: Warner Bros. Pictures
- Release date: September 26, 1936
- Running time: 90 minutes
- Country: United States
- Language: English

Cain and Mabel is a 1936 American romantic comedy film directed by Lloyd Bacon and designed as a vehicle for Marion Davies in which she co-stars with Clark Gable. The story had been filmed before, in 1924, by William Randolph Hearst's production company, Cosmopolitan, as a silent called The Great White Way, starring Anita Stewart and Oscar Shaw. In this version, Robert Paige introduced the song "I'll Sing You a Thousand Love Songs", with music by Harry Warren and words by Al Dubin, who also wrote "Coney Island", "Here Comes Chiquita", and other songs.

== Plot ==
Waitress-turned-Broadway star Mabel O'Dare and garage-mechanic-turned-prize fighter Larry Cain dislike each other intensely, but press agent Aloysius K. Reilly cooks up a phony romance between them for publicity. Inevitably, the two fall in love for real, and plan on getting married, with Mabel quitting show business to be a housewife and Cain quitting the fight racket to run garages in New Jersey.

When their entourages get wind of their plan, they plant the story in the newspapers, and each thinks the other one betrayed their secret - until Mabel's aunt tells Mabel the truth. Mabel abandons her show and rushes to Philadelphia where Cain is fighting. Having been told by his manager that Mabel is going to marry crooner Ronny Caudwell, an enraged Cain is waging an all-out fight against his opponent, until he hears Mabel's voice and is knocked down. Reilly confesses to Cain that he was the one who leaked the story, and Cain's second, DoDo accidentally throws a towel into the ring, making Cain the loser by a technical knockout. But since Mabel has bet on the other boxer, the newly reunited couple will have a tidy nest egg to start their new life together.

== Cast ==
- Marion Davies as Mabel O'Dare
- Clark Gable as Larry Cain
- Allen Jenkins as Dodo
- Roscoe Karns as Aloysius K. Reilly
- Walter Catlett as Jake Sherman
- Robert Paige as Ronny Cauldwell (credited as David Carlyle)
- Hobart Cavanaugh as Milo, the Stage Manager
- Ruth Donnelly as Aunt Mimi
- Pert Kelton as Toddy Williams
- William Collier, Sr. as Pat "Pop" Walters
- Sammy White as singer in "Coney Island"
- E.E. Clive as Charles "Chuck" Fendwick
- Allen Pomeroy as Tom Reed, a Boxer
- Robert Middlemass as Mr. George, Cafe Proprietor
- Joseph Crehan as Reed's Manager
- Charles Teske as a Dancer
- Marie Prevost as Sherman's receptionist (uncredited)

== Production and reception ==
Marion Davies, whose acting career was supported by her lover William Randolph Hearst, left Metro-Goldwyn-Mayer after she failed to receive parts in The Barretts of Wimpole Street and Marie Antoinette. She gained a contract with Warner Bros. Pictures which started with Page Miss Glory and Hearts Divided.

Shooting on Cain and Mabel was delayed because the part of the leading man, which eventually went to Clark Gable, had not yet been cast. Hearst persuaded Warner Bros. studio head Jack L. Warner, an old friend, to get Gable from MGM as Davies' co-star. Hearst wielded considerable influence on the production: he also rejected Dick Powell for the part which went to Robert Paige – billed here as "David Carlyle" – apparently because he was jealous. He perceived that Davies found Powell attractive.

The film was shot on Stage 16 at the Warner lot, which was the standard 45 feet tall, but Davies wanted the set to be larger, so she called Warner and requested that they raise the roof of the sound stage. Warner refused until Davies called Hearst and convinced Warner to sign onto the idea, but only if Hearst paid for the renovation. Due to the shooting schedule, they could not do it the standard way and rip the roof off and build up. Instead, they got several hundred workers and hand jacks and surrounded the building with four large bass drums on each corner. Then the drum would be hit, and the workers would crank in unison. Once the building was a foot off the ground railroad ties were placed. Then they raised it another foot and crisscrossed the railroad ties. They continued with this until the sound stage was standing at its current height of 98 feet. Then the foundation and walls were quickly built, and the sound stage was available again. Stage 16 is now one of the tallest sound stages in North America.

== Reception ==
The film was a box-office flop, with critics finding that Gable was miscast as a fighter. Paige stated that he "was absolutely crushed" by the poor reception to the film and stopped using Carlyle for credits. Davies appeared in only one more film, Ever Since Eve.

== Awards and honors ==
Cain and Mabel was nominated for a 1937 Academy Award for "Best Dance Direction" by Bobby Connolly.

== Works cited ==
- Medved, Harry; Medved, Michael (1984). The Hollywood Hall of Shame: The Most Expensive Flops in Movie History. Angus & Robertson. ISBN 0207149291.
