= Dorothy Young =

American entertainer and actress (1907–2011)

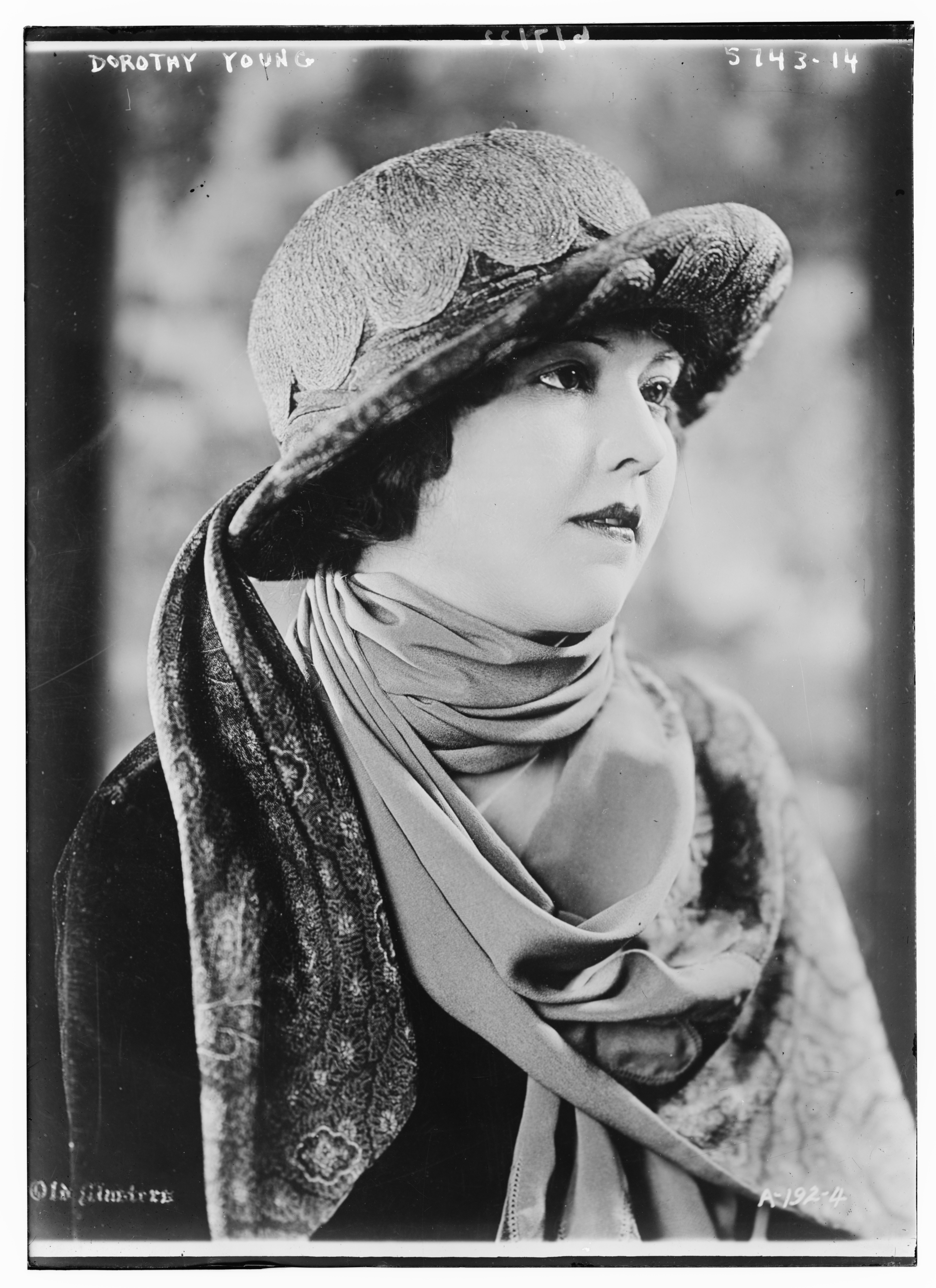
- Young [between ca. 1920 and ca. 1925]
- Born: Dorothy Lena Young; May 3, 1907; Otisville, New York, U.S.
- Died: March 20, 2011 (aged 103); Tinton Falls, New Jersey, U.S.
- Occupations: Actress; stage assistant to Harry Houdini; novelist
- Years active: 1925–2007

Dorothy Lena Young (May 3, 1907 – March 20, 2011) was an American entertainer who worked as a stage assistant to magician Harry Houdini from 1925 to 1926. She later became a Broadway actress as well as a touring dancer.

== Career ==
She was selected by Houdini because she was shorter than he was. She left the act two months prior to his death on October 31, 1926. She appeared in the several Houdini documentaries.

After his death, Young, the daughter of a Methodist minister, appeared on Broadway in Jarnegan (1928–29), Conquest (1933), and New Faces of 1936 (1936). After leaving acting, she and her second husband, Gilbert Kiamie, toured the world as the Latin dancing team of "Dorothy and Gilbert".

She was the author of two novels loosely based on her life: Diary Without Dates and Dancing on a Dime, the latter of which was made into a feature film in 1940 by Universal Studios, as well as the booklet Touring with Houdini, published in 2003.

== Personal life ==
Her first husband, Robert Perkins, was an agent for the FBI. Her second husband, Gilbert Kiamie, died in 1992. Young, the last surviving member of Houdini's touring show, died in Tinton Falls, New Jersey, on March 20, 2011, aged 103.

== See also ==
- List of centenarians (actors, filmmakers and entertainers)

== Legacy ==
- The Dorothy Young Center for the Arts, housed at Drew University in Madison, New Jersey.
