= Janet Warren =

- Born: Ruth Elaine Morey; October 3, 1921; Santa Ana, California, U.S.
- Died: January 6, 2008 (aged 86); Chatsworth, Los Angeles, California, U.S.
- Occupation: Actress

Janet Warren (October 3, 1921 - January 6, 2008), also known as Elaine Morey, was an actress in the United States during the 1940s and 50s. She attended schools in the Los Angeles metropolitan area, including an acting school she started attending since the age of 13. After spending her late teen years as a drama coach for other child actors, she signed a contract with Universal Pictures in 1940 and began appearing in films, frequently in Abbott and Costello comedies, horror films, and teenage musicals.

== Career ==
During her childhood, Warren attended Hollywood High School and Alexander Hamilton High School. She was also enrolled in a child acting school from the age of 13, with Jane Withers as one of her classmates. The school would also have a play written by the principal for Warren in particular that she acted in. Later living in Santa Ana, California in her late teens, she worked as a drama coach and ran a class for children that worked in theatre. She also performed at the Little Theatre in Los Angeles, California.

Warren was cast in the film Buck Privates in December 1940. The casting occurred after approaching studio executives to ask for a role for one of her students, but was offered a role herself instead. She was also signed to a long-term contract for several future films. After appearing in several minor roles in early 1941, she was cast in a major female role in Moonlight in Hawaii. Her impressive performance resulted in her contract being renewed in June 1941.

== Filmography ==
- Buck Privates (1941)
- Hello, Sucker (1941) as Receptionist
- Cracked Nuts (1941)
- Sing Another Chorus (1941)
- Keep 'Em Flying (1941)
- Moonlight in Hawaii (1941) as Doris
- Too Many Blondes (1941) as Sophie Deltz
- Double Date (1941) as Schoolgirl
- Law of the Range (1941) as Virginia O'Brien
- The Flame of New Orleans (1941)
- It Started with Eve (1941)
- Pardon My Sarong (1942)
- Broadway (1942) as Ruby
- Wild Horse Phantom (1944) as Marian Garnet
- The Jade Mask (1945) as Jean Kent
- The Shanghai Cobra (1945) as Record Machine Operator
- Winter Wonderland (1947)
- The Twonky (1953) as Carolyn West

== Personal life ==
Warren married drama coach Robert W. Major. In September 1943, she disappeared and was reported missing by her husband, with only a note reading "I'm going away; goodbye forever" left behind. By the following year, she had filed for divorce from Major, charging him with "extreme cruelty". The divorce was finalized in December 1944.

Warren married again, in 1949, to Barton Yarborough, a union that lasted until his death in 1951.
