= Maureen Cannon (singer) =

American singer and actress

Maureen Catherine Cannon (December 3, 1924 - September 4, 2004) was an American singer and actress.

== Early years ==
Maureen Catherine Cannon was born in Chicago, the daughter of immigrants from Ireland. Her father, Edward Cannon, was a streetcar conductor in Chicago. She had a theatrical background on her mother, Bridget's, side; her grandfather was a singer and dancer. Cannon began studying tap dancing when she was nine years old, and she and her brother, Edward, formed an amateur dance team. By age 12, however, she "decided there was nothing in it" and focused her attention on singing instead. She gave her first concert 1 1/2 years later.

Her voice attracted the attention of Chicago impresario Paul Longone when she was 15 years old. He saw her future as a coloratura opera singer, but his death and her changing musical preferences turned her interest to a career in popular music. She sang in some local clubs and in a production of My Maryland at Providence High School in Chicago. On July 7, 1941, actor Ezra Stone visited Chicago looking for talent, and Cannon sang for him. Stone encouraged her to go to New York to see producer George Abbott. She saw Abbott on the first day of a two-day trip and signed a contract with him on the second day.

== Career ==
With no previous professional experience, Cannon debuted on Broadway when she was 16 years old, portraying Helen Schlessinger in Best Foot Forward (1941). An Associated Press article about her noted that she sang two hit songs in the musical and that she was "overshadowed only by Rosemary Lane in the importance of her role". Theater critic Burns Mantle wrote that Cannon "sings 'Shady Lady Bird' to many encores". Following the Broadway production, She performed on the road in Best Foot Forward including a run in Chicago.

In 1943, Cannon signed a seven-year contract with Universal Pictures with a salary specified to graduate to $2500 per week. Superior Judge Joseph W. Vickers approved the contract with the stipulations that 10 percent of her income be invested in war bonds and another 10 percent be put in a trust fund. Her film debut came in Get Going (1943). Two of the film's songs, "Got Love" and "Hold that Line", were written especially for Cannon's singing style. She also appeared in the film Gals, Incorporated (1943), but her option was not picked up.

During World War II, Cannon was active in patriotic entertainment, including functions of the United Service Organizations. In March 1944 she debuted as a night club performer at the Copacabana, performing there for 14 weeks. Another debut followed in July 1944 when she performed in a St. Louis Municipal Opera Theatre presentation for the first time. The production was Hit the Deck. She returned to Muny Opera a month later to sing the title role in Irene. She also performed with Starlight Operettas in Dallas.

Cannon returned to Broadway in 1945, portraying Rosie Moore in Up in Central Park. An Associated Press article stated, "The critics were unanimous in approving the sprite's ability and attractiveness". The opportunity for that role arose when producer Mike Todd was dissatisfied with the performance of the actress who had the role in tryouts in Philadelphia. He contacted Cannon, who left her work in a night club in Washington and auditioned for the part. The audition was successful, and she stepped into the part five days before the show opened on Broadway. After that show's Broadway run concluded, she went with the road version on a coast-to-coast tour.

Cannon also returned to St. Louis, appearing in the Muny Opera's productions of Irene (1949), The New Moon (1949), Bloomer Girl (1949), Of Thee I Sing (1950), and Gentlemen Prefer Blondes (1959).

In June 1950, Paul Whiteman chose Cannon for his television program. That September she became a regular on the show, singing two songs in each episode. She and Earl Wrightson co-starred in the 1951 summer replacement for Whiteman's show. She stayed on Whiteman's show for 3 1/2 years. Other TV programs on which she appeared included Eddie Fisher's and Jack Paar's shows, Goodyear Playhouse, and Holiday Hotel. She also performed for 13 weeks on a BBC program in England.

In 1952 she sang nightly at the Radisson's Flame Room in Minneapolis. Other venues in which she performed included the Mapes Hotel in Reno, the Palmer House in Chicago, the Shamrock Hotel in Dallas, and the Waldorf Astoria in New York.
