= How's About It =

1943 film by Erle C. Kenton

- Directed by: Erle C. Kenton
- Starring: The Andrews Sisters; Grace McDonald; Robert Paige; Shemp Howard
- Production company: Universal Pictures
- Distributed by: Universal Pictures
- Release date: February 5, 1943
- Country: USA
- Language: English

How's About It is a 1943 musical film starring The Andrews Sisters.

== Cast ==
- The Andrews Sisters as Themselves
- Grace McDonald as Marion Bliss
- Robert Paige as George Selby
- Shemp Howard as Alf
- Buddy Rich as Orchestra Leader

== Production ==
The film was known during production as I Want to Dance, then Solid Senders.
