= Destiny (1944 film) =

1944 film by Reginald LeBorg

- Theatrical release poster
- Directed by: Reginald LeBorg; Julien Duvivier (uncredited)
- Screenplay by: Roy Chanslor; Ernest Pascal
- Story by: Jean Levy-Strauss (uncredited)
- Produced by: Roy William Neill; Howard Benedict (uncredited)
- Starring: Gloria Jean; Alan Curtis; Frank Craven
- Cinematography: Paul Ivano; George Robinson
- Edited by: Paul Landres
- Music by: Frank Skinner; Alexandre Tansman
- Production company: Universal Pictures
- Distributed by: Universal Pictures
- Release date: December 22, 1944 (United States)
- Running time: 65 minutes
- Country: United States
- Language: English

Destiny is a 1944 American drama film noir directed by Reginald LeBorg and starring Gloria Jean, Alan Curtis, Frank Craven, and Grace McDonald.

== Plot ==
Cliff Banks is a hard-luck drifter, wanted by the police after becoming an unwitting accomplice in a bank robbery. He encounters a succession of women: a showgirl who steals his money; a librarian who listens to his story sympathetically but is left stranded when Cliff takes off with her car; a roadhouse proprietor who tries to turn Cliff in for a reward; and finally Jane Broderick, a blind girl who lives with her father at a secluded farmhouse. Cliff intends to rob the farmer and move on, but Jane discovers the theft and compels him to stay. When the bank robber confesses, Cliff is exonerated and begins a new life with Jane.

== Cast ==
- Gloria Jean as Jane Broderick
- Alan Curtis as Cliff Banks
- Frank Craven as Clem Broderick
- Grace McDonald as Betty
- Vivian Austin as Phyllis Prager
- Frank Fenton as Sam Baker
- Minna Gombell as Marie

== Background ==
Destiny was originally planned as the opening segment of the episodic all-star drama Flesh and Fantasy (1943), directed by Julien Duvivier. Universal Pictures previewed the film to enthusiastic response; Gloria Jean's performance received the highest praise, but the studio recut the feature from four sequences to three and shelved the first half-hour.

Two years later, the studio assigned producer Roy William Neill to expand the half-hour Gloria Jean sequence into a full-length feature.(Neill produced and directed the Sherlock Holmes film series starring Basil Rathbone and Nigel Bruce.) Neill produced the new material but did not direct; the project was rushed through production in two weeks while Gloria Jean was available, so Neill had no time to plan his artistic, carefully composed scenes. Indeed, Neill never appeared on the set during filming of Destiny.

The new director was Reginald LeBorg. Screenwriter Roy Chanslor wrote additional material: his action-melodrama script covered the first half of the new feature, with Alan Curtis the focal point; Gloria Jean does not appear until the second half, constituting the original Flesh and Fantasy footage with the blind girl and her father. Chanslor tacked on a new, happier ending to replace the tragic ending staged for Flesh and Fantasy. Because the new footage had not only a different director but also a different cameraman and art director, sharp-eyed viewers can easily tell the new LeBorg scenes photographed by George Robinson (which have the "flat" look of most of that era's Universal crime thrillers) from the Duvivier sequence photographed by Paul Ivano, which is much more atmospheric and shadow-laden. The new footage for Destiny (under the working title The Fugitive) was filmed in September 1944; the film was released to theaters in December.

== Reception ==
Critical response was generally very good to excellent. The Independent: "Here's a gem of a sleeper in the program division... a sterling attraction for the lower half of any bill. As a matter of fact, in the average house, it will serve very nicely as a topper." Showmen's Trade Review: "Well above the average in general entertainment. A picture most theatergoers will enjoy so much that they'll carry the 'must-see' message to their friends... Alan Curtis gives an unusually strong characterization of the ex-convict. Gloria Jean is excellent as the blind girl and Frank Craven unusually good as her father." Charles Ryweck of Motion Picture Daily was more discerning, noticing the film's patchwork: "The transition from a tough, fast-moving thriller, depicting Alan Curtis as an innocent who has twice been implicated in crimes, to idyllic sequences between Curtis and Gloria Jean, playing a straight role as a sensitive, blind girl who is instrumental in purging Curtis of any impulse to do wrong, is difficult to follow... The parts are more interesting than the whole as the sharp break in mood mitigates against the film."

Gloria Jean singled out Destiny as both her favorite performance and her greatest professional disappointment. She recalled seeing Destiny in a studio projection room: "First I got the shock that it was cut out of Flesh and Fantasy. They said it was so good they had to make a full-length movie out of it... They didn't tell me it was going to be a B with a bad ending!"

== See also ==
- List of American films of 1944
