= Fired Wife =

1943 film by Charles Lamont

- Directed by: Charles Lamont
- Written by: Michael Fessier; Ernest Pagano
- Based on: original story by Hagar Wilde
- Produced by: Universal Pictures
- Starring: Diana Barrymore; Robert Paige; Louise Allbritton
- Cinematography: Paul Ivano
- Edited by: Paul Landres
- Music by: Frank Skinner
- Distributed by: Universal Pictures
- Release date: September 3, 1943
- Running time: 73 minutes
- Country: United States
- Language: English

Fired Wife is a 1943 comedy film directed by Charles Lamont and starring Robert Paige, Diana Barrymore and Louise Allbritton. It was produced and distributed by Universal Pictures. This was one of the final films in Barrymore's short-lived Universal contract.

== Cast ==
- Diana Barrymore – Eve Starr
- Robert Paige – Hank Dunne
- Louise Allbritton – Tabitha 'Tig' Dunne
- Walter Abel – Chris McClelland
- George Dolenz – Oscar Blix

== Production ==
The film was originally meant to star Robert Cummings but he turned down the role, leading to a contract dispute with Universal.
