= Strictly in the Groove =

1942 film

- Directed by: Vernon Keays
- Cinematography: John W. Boyle
- Music by: Songs: Jimmy McHugh (music); Harold Adamson (lyrics)
- Distributed by: Universal Pictures
- Release date: 20 November 1942
- Running time: 60 minutes
- Country: United States
- Language: English

Strictly in the Groove is a 1942 American musical comedy film directed by Vernon Keays. It is built around musical numbers, experienced comedy acts and guest stars.

== Plot ==
A jive-talking college student tries to organize a swing-music show at a local resort, where the manager puts up some opposition.

== Cast ==
- Leon Errol as Durham
- Shemp Howard as Pops
- Franklin Pangborn as Cathcart
- Grace McDonald as Dixie
- Mary Healy as Sally Monroe
- Richard Davies as Bob Saunders
- Russell Hicks as R.C. Saunders
- Eddie Johnson as Skat
- Charles Lang as Russ Monroe
- Ralph Dunn as Big Boy
- Holmes Herbert as Commissioner
- Lloyd Ingraham as McClelland
- Tim Ryan as Professor Blake
- unbilled players include Spade Cooley and Neely Edwards

== Musical guests ==
- Ozzie Nelson and his Orchestra
- Martha Tilton
- Jimmie Davis
- The Dinning Sisters
- Diamond Solid-Aires
- Jimmy Wakely and his Trio
