= Hat Check Honey =

1944 film by Edward F. Cline

- Directed by: Edward F. Cline
- Starring: Leon Errol; Grace McDonald
- Cinematography: Milton R. Krasner
- Distributed by: Universal Pictures
- Release date: March 10, 1944
- Running time: 68 minutes
- Country: United States
- Language: English

Hat Check Honey is a 1944 American musical-comedy film directed by Edward F. Cline. It stars Leon Errol and Grace McDonald.

== Plot ==
Dan Briggs and his son work as a duo in a carnival act, but the father breaks up the act so his son can pursue his solo career. As he works his way from busboy at the Penguin Club, to boy singer, then to Hollywood, romantic entanglements and a father-son reconciliation are woven among several musical numbers.

== Cast ==
- Leon Errol as 'Happy' Dan Briggs
- Grace McDonald as Susan Brent
- Walter Catlett as Tim Martel
- Richard David as Dan Briggs Jr.
- Ramsay Ames as Mona Mallory
- Jimmy Cash as Band Singer Jimmy Cash
- Milburn Stone as David Courtland
- Mary Gordon as Jennie
- Freddie Slack as himself
- Harry Owens as himself
- Ted Weems as himself
- Lee Bennett as Alan Dane
- Russell Hicks as J.J. Worthington
- Chester Clute as Uniformed Officer
- Emmett Vogan as Lym
- Jack Rice as C.B.
- Minna Phillips as Flossie
- Eddie Acuff as Cameraman
- Claire Whitney as Mrs. Worthington
- Ray Walker as Gabby Post
- Unbilled players include Neely Edwards

== See also ==
- List of American films of 1944
