= Don't Get Personal (1942 film) =

1942 film directed by Charles Lamont

- Directed by: Charles Lamont
- Written by: Bernard Feins; Hugh Wedlock, Jr. Howard Snyder
- Starring: Jane Frazee
- Music by: Franz Waxman
- Distributed by: Universal Pictures
- Release date: January 2, 1942
- Running time: 60 min.
- Country: United States
- Language: English

Don't Get Personal is a 1942 American romantic musical film directed by Charles Lamont and starring Jane Frazee.

== Cast ==
- Hugh Herbert - Elmer Whippet / Oscar Whippet
- Mischa Auer - Stainslaus Noodnick a.k.a. Charlie
- Jane Frazee - Mary Reynolds
- Anne Gwynne - Susan Blair
- Robert Paige - Paul Stevens
- Ernest Truex - Jules Kinsey
- Andrew Tombes - James M. Snow
- Sterling Holloway - Lucky
- Richard Davies - John Stowe
- Ray Walker - Pitchman
