= Hello, Sucker =

1941 film

- Theatrical release poster
- Directed by: Edward F. Cline
- Screenplay by: Maurice Leo; Paul Gerard Smith
- Story by: Arthur T. Horman
- Produced by: Ken Goldsmith
- Starring: Hugh Herbert; Tom Brown; Peggy Moran; Lewis Howard; June Storey; Walter Catlett; Robert Emmett Keane
- Cinematography: Charles Van Enger
- Edited by: Ralph Dixon
- Production company: Universal Pictures
- Distributed by: Universal Pictures
- Release date: July 11, 1941
- Running time: 60 minutes
- Country: United States
- Language: English

Hello, Sucker is a 1941 American comedy film directed by Edward F. Cline and written by Maurice Leo and Paul Gerard Smith. The film stars Hugh Herbert, Tom Brown, Peggy Moran, Lewis Howard, June Storey, Walter Catlett and Robert Emmett Keane. The film was released on July 11, 1941, by Universal Pictures.

== Synopsis ==
A young couple take over a failing booking agency for vaudeville performers and try to turn the business around with the assistance of Hubert Worthington Clippe.

== Cast ==
- Hugh Herbert as Hubert Worthington Clippe
- Tom Brown as Bob Wade
- Peggy Moran as Rosalie Watson
- Lewis Howard as Walter Guggin
- June Storey as Trixie Medcalf
- Walter Catlett as G. Remington 'Max' Conway
- Robert Emmett Keane as Connors
- Mantan Moreland as Elevator Boy
- Janet Warren as Receptionist
- Nell O'Day as Model
- Dorothy Darrell as Model
- William Black (actor) as Man with dog (uncredited)

== Bibliography ==
- Fetrow, Alan G. Feature Films, 1940-1949: a United States Filmography. McFarland, 1994.
