= Give Out, Sisters =

1942 film by Edward F. Cline

Give Out Sisters
- Directed by: Edward F. Cline
- Written by: Paul Gerard Smith; Warren Wilson; (screenplay); Lee Sands; Fred Rath; (original story)
- Produced by: Bernard W. Burton
- Starring: The Andrews Sisters; Grace McDonald; Dan Dailey; Charles Butterworth; Walter Catlett; William Frawley
- Cinematography: George Robinson
- Edited by: Paul Landres
- Distributed by: Universal Pictures
- Release date: September 1, 1942
- Running time: 65 minutes
- Country: United States
- Language: English

Give Out, Sisters is a 1942 American film starring The Andrews Sisters. The film co-stars Dan Dailey and the teenage couple of the time, Donald O'Connor and Peggy Ryan. Dailey and O'Connor went on to be in the 1954 film There's No Business Like Show Business. The song "Pennsylvania Polka" was introduced by the Andrews Sisters.

== Cast ==
- The Andrews Sisters as Themselves
- Grace McDonald as Gracie Waverly
- Dan Dailey as Bob Edwards
- Charles Butterworth as Prof. Woof
- Walter Catlett as Gribble
- William Frawley as Harrison
- Donald O'Connor as Don
- Peggy Ryan as Peggy
- Edith Barrett as Agatha Waverly
- Marie Blake as Biandina Waverly
- Fay Helm as Susan Waverly
- Emmett Vogan as Batterman
- Leonard Carey as Jamison - The Waverly Butler
- Richard Davies as Kendall
- Irving Bacon as Dr. Howard
- The Jivin' Jacks and Jills as Dancers
- Leon Belasco as Waiter
- Robert Emmett Keane as Lawyer Peabody
- Lorin Raker as Dr. Bradshaw
- Jason Robards Sr. as Drunk
- Duke York as Louie
- Alphonse Martell as Headwaiter
- Emmett Smith as Porter
- Fred 'Snowflake' Toones as Nightclub Valet
