= Cowboy in Manhattan =

1943 film

- Theatrical release poster
- Directed by: Frank Woodruff
- Screenplay by: Warren Wilson
- Story by: William C. Thomas; Maxwell Shane; Warren Wilson
- Produced by: Paul Malvern
- Starring: Robert Paige; Frances Langford; Leon Errol; Walter Catlett; Joe Sawyer; Jennifer Holt
- Cinematography: Elwood Bredell
- Edited by: Fred R. Feitshans Jr.
- Production company: Universal Pictures
- Distributed by: Universal Pictures
- Release date: May 21, 1943
- Running time: 56 minutes
- Country: United States
- Language: English

Cowboy in Manhattan is a 1943 American comedy film directed by Frank Woodruff and written by Warren Wilson. The film stars Robert Paige, Frances Langford, Leon Errol, Walter Catlett, Joe Sawyer and Jennifer Holt. The film was released on May 21, 1943, by Universal Pictures.

== Plot ==
Producer Ace Robbins (Walter Catlett) induces a group of rich Texans to finance his new play, but they demand that it open by December 29 (the day Texas was admitted as a state). To generate free publicity, Robbins plants a fake story about star Barbara Lee (Frances Langford) having an affair. She is furious, and threatens to quit if he does it again.

Texan and songwriter Bob Allen (Robert Paige) shows up the week before the show is to open, and tries to get Robbins to use his songs in the play. Robbins refuses his offer. With ticket sales faltering, Allen comes up with a scheme: He'll impersonate a Texas cattle baron who is in love with Barbare Lee and pretend to buy up all the tickets for the show. This will dupe the public into thinking the show is a hit, and subsequently create demand for the show.

On opening night, Allen (in his cattle baron disguise) interrupts the musical and demands that the cast sing songs he himself has written. Robbins is furious, but Allen says he'll reveal the love-affair scheme if he's stopped. Barbara and the cast like the songs, and the show is rewritten. When Barbara learns that "the cattle baron" is a fake, she goes into hiding with the help of nightclub owner Louie Moran (Joe Sawyer). When Robbins presses Moran about Barbara's whereabout, Moran says she'd been kidnapped by a vicious criminal. Bob Allen, who by now has fallen in love with Barbara, raises $25,000 to free her. Moran pockets the money, and tells Robbins and Allen where their star is hiding out.

Moran has surrounded Barbara by a bunch of thugs to prevent Robbins and Allen from recapturing her, but Allen fights his way through to her. Allen confesses that he loves Barbara, and she returns his affections. Barbara arrives back at the theater just in time for the opening curtain. Allen's uncle, having discovered that Bob has punched out some criminals, decides to give Bob a $2 million inheritance now that he's proven he is a "real Texan". The show is a huge hit.

== Cast ==
- Robert Paige as Bob Allen
- Frances Langford as Barbara "Babs" Lee
- Leon Errol as Hank
- Walter Catlett as Ace Robbins
- Joe Sawyer as Louie Moran
- Jennifer Holt as Mitzi
- George Cleveland as Wild Bill
- Will Wright as Higgins
- Dorothy Granger as Tommy
- Lorin Raker as Potter
- Marek Windheim as Count Kardos
- Jack Mulhall as Headwaiter
- Matt McHugh as Cab Driver
- Tommy Mack as Mac
- Billy Nelson as Bill
