= Patrick the Great =

1945 film

- Directed by: Frank Ryan
- Written by: Ralph Block; Jane Hall; Frederick Kohner
- Screenplay by: Dorothy Bennett; Bertram Millhauser
- Produced by: Howard Benedict
- Starring: Donald O'Connor; Peggy Ryan; Frances Dee
- Cinematography: Frank Redman
- Edited by: Ted J. Kent
- Music by: Hans J. Salter
- Production company: Universal Pictures
- Distributed by: Universal Pictures
- Release date: 4 May 1945
- Running time: 84 minutes
- Country: United States
- Language: English

Patrick the Great is a 1945 American drama film starring Donald O'Connor, Peggy Ryan, and Frances Dee. This was the last film for O'Connor and Ryan together, who had been a teenage team for the past several years. This was also O'Connor's last film before he went to serve in World War II.

== Plot ==
Pat Donahue (Donald O'Connor) is living and working in the highland region of western Massachusetts, but longs for a career in show business. The young, but talented, Donahue hears about an opening in New York, and travels to the auditions. He wins the role, but later finds out that it was originally intended for his father Patrick Donahue (Donald Cook). Judy Watkin (Peggy Ryan) considers the younger Donahue her boyfriend, but a New York sophisticated young lady Lynn Andrews (Frances Dee) catches the young man's eye. The young Donahue struggles with his reluctance to do what's right with respect to his father. Comedy and music are in abundant supply in this romp.

== Cast ==
- Donald O'Connor as Pat Donahue Jr.
- Peggy Ryan as Judy Watkin
- Frances Dee as Lynn Andrews
- Donald Cook as Pat Donahue Sr.
- Eve Arden as Jean Mathews
- Thomas Gomez as Max Wilson
- Gavin Muir as Prentis Johns
- Andrew Tombes as Sam Bassett
- Irving Bacon as Mr. Merney
- Emmett Vogan as Alsop
- unbilled players include Neely Edwards, Lassie Lou Ahern and Ray Walker
