= Moonlight in Hawaii =

1941 film by Charles Lamont

- Directed by: Charles Lamont
- Written by: Eve Greene; Morton Grant]
- Produced by: Ken Goldsmith
- Starring: Jane Frazee; Johnny Downs; Leon Errol
- Cinematography: Stanley Cortez
- Edited by: Arthur Hilton
- Music by: Frank Skinner
- Production company: Universal Pictures
- Distributed by: Universal Pictures
- Release date: November 21, 1941
- Running time: 60 minutes
- Country: United States
- Language: English

Moonlight in Hawaii is a 1941 American musical comedy film directed by Charles Lamont and starring Jane Frazee, Johnny Downs and Leon Errol. It was produced and distributed by Universal Pictures. Future star Maria Montez has a small role, with her hair dyed blonde.

== Plot ==
Deciding to quit his singing act and become a tourist guide, Pete Fleming escorts wealthy Mrs. Floto and her three nieces to Hawaii for a vacation. Behind his back, Pete's three bandmates stowaway and tag along.

At a resort, bandleader Clipper Conovan can't hire the musicians, but hotel guest Toby Spencer, taking a shine to Pete, introduces him to her father Walter, who runs a pineapple plantation. Walter is involved in a business dispute with his partner, Lawton, and both men vie for Mrs. Floto's attentions as well.

Toby falls for Pete, who discovers she can sing and wants her to be a part of the band's new act. But one of Mrs. Floto's nieces also wants to sing, and exotic entertainer Ilani catches everyone's eye, too. Toby and Pete ultimately form a partnership, professionally and romantically, while Mrs. Floto, unable to decide between the two pineapple growers, surprises both by deciding to marry Clipper the bandleader.

== Cast ==
- Johnny Downs as Pete
- Jane Frazee as Toby
- Leon Errol as Spencer
- Mischa Auer ... Clipper
- Charles Coleman as Butler
- Sunnie O'Dea as Gloria
- Marjorie Gateson as Aunt Effie Floto
- Richard Carle as Lawton
- Maria Montez as Ilani
- Janet Warren as Doris
- Judd McMichael as Ollie Barrett
- Ted McMichael as Red Simpson
- Joe McMichael as Beans Smith
- Mary Lou Cook as Mary Lou
- Ernie Stanton as Truck Driver (uncredited)

== Bibliography ==
- Fetrow, Alan G. Feature Films, 1940-1949: a United States Filmography. McFarland, 1994.
