= Shady Lady (1945 film) =

1945 film by George Waggner

- Directed by: George Waggner
- Screenplay by: Curt Siodmak
- Starring: Charles Coburn; Robert Paige
- Production company: Universal Studios
- Release date: October 1945
- Running time: 91 minutes
- Country: United States
- Language: English

Shady Lady is a 1945 American romantic comedy film directed by George Waggner and starring Charles Coburn, Robert Paige, and Ginny Simms. Waggner originally offered Susanna Foster a starring role which she refused. Ginny Simms sings floor show songs "Cuddle Up a Little Closer", "In Love With Love" and "Xango".

The choreography is by Lester Horton.

== Cast ==
- Charles Coburn as Col. John Appleby
- Robert Paige as Bob Wendell
- Ginny Simms as Leonora Lee Appleby
- Alan Curtis as Marty Martin
- Martha O'Driscoll as Gloria Wendell
- Kathleen Howard as Butch
- James Burke as Crane
- Joe Frisco as Tramp
- John Gallaudet as Rappaport
- Thomas E. Jackson as Bowen
- Billy Wayne as Fred
- William Hall as Clarence
- William Hunt as Warren
- William E. Green as Billy Norton
- Chuck Hamilton as Carlson
