= Frontier Badmen =

1943 film by Ford Beebe

- Directed by: Ford Beebe
- Screenplay by: Gerald Geraghty; Morgan Cox
- Story by: Gerald Geraghty; Morgan Cox
- Produced by: Ford Beebe
- Starring: Robert Paige; Anne Gwynne; Diana Barrymore
- Cinematography: William A. Sickner
- Edited by: Fred Feitshans
- Production company: Universal Pictures
- Distributed by: Universal Pictures
- Release date: August 6, 1943
- Running time: 73 minutes
- Country: United States
- Language: English

Frontier Badmen is a 1943 American Western film directed by Ford Beebe and starring Robert Paige, Anne Gwynne and Diana Barrymore. It was produced and distributed by Universal Pictures. Several members of the cast are offspring of silent screen stars including Noah Beery Jr., Lon Chaney Jr. and Diana Barrymore.

== Plot ==
A Texas cattle rancher (Robert Paige) and his sidekick (Noah Beery Jr.) break up a buying monopoly in Kansas.

== Cast ==
- Robert Paige as Steve Logan
- Anne Gwynne as Chris Prentice
- Noah Beery Jr. as Jim Cardwell
- Diana Barrymore as Claire
- Leo Carrillo as Chinito Galvez
- Andy Devine as Slim; Cowhand
- Lon Chaney Jr. as Chango
- Thomas Gomez as Ballard
- Frank Lackteen as Cherokee
- William Farnum as Dad Courtwright
