= Senorita from the West =

1945 film directed by Frank R. Strayer

- Directed by: Frank Strayer
- Written by: Howard Dimsdale
- Produced by: Philip Cahn
- Starring: Allan Jones; Bonita Granville
- Cinematography: Paul Ivano
- Edited by: Paul Landres
- Music by: Edgar Fairchild
- Production company: Universal Pictures
- Distributed by: Universal Pictures
- Release date: October 12, 1945 (US)
- Running time: 63 minutes
- Country: United States
- Language: English

Senorita from the West is a 1945 American comedy-drama film directed by Frank Strayer from an original screenplay by Howard Dimsdale. The picture stars Allan Jones and Bonita Granville, and was released by Universal Pictures on October 12, 1945.

== Cast ==
- Allan Jones as Phil Bradley
- Bonita Granville as Jeannie Blake
- Jess Barker as Tim Winters
- George Cleveland as Cap
- Fuzzy Knight as Rosebud
- Oscar O'Shea as Dusty
- Renny McEvoy as William Wylliams
- Olin Howlin as Justice of Peace
- Danny Mummert as Kid
- Bob Merrill as Elmer
- Emmett Vogan as Producer
- Billy Nelson as Taxi driver
- Jack Clifford as Motor cop
- Spade Cooley as himself
