= Her Primitive Man =

1944 film directed by Charles Lamont

- Theatrical release poster
- Directed by: Charles Lamont
- Screenplay by: Michael Fessier; Ernest Pagano
- Story by: Dick Irving Hyland
- Produced by: Michael Fessier; Ernest Pagano
- Starring: Louise Allbritton; Robert Paige; Robert Benchley; Edward Everett Horton; Helen Broderick; Stephanie Bachelor; Walter Catlett; Ernest Truex
- Cinematography: Charles Van Enger
- Edited by: Ray Snyder
- Music by: Edward Ward
- Production company: Universal Pictures
- Distributed by: Universal Pictures
- Release date: March 30, 1944
- Running time: 79 minutes
- Country: United States
- Language: English

Her Primitive Man is a 1944 American comedy film directed by Charles Lamont and written by Michael Fessier and Ernest Pagano. The film stars Louise Allbritton, Robert Paige, Robert Benchley, Edward Everett Horton, Helen Broderick, Stephanie Bachelor, Walter Catlett and Ernest Truex. The film was released on March 30, 1944, by Universal Pictures.

== Plot ==
A new book being written by "adventurer" Pete Matthews, entitled Life and Death Among the Lupari Savages, is making thousands of dollars in advanced sales due to the publicity efforts of its publisher, Martin Osborne. Unknown to the publisher and the treatise's prospective readers, however, is the fact that Peter is writing his book from the barstool of a Havana casino, where he is getting his information about the headhunters of Lupari Island from Orrin Tracy, a worldly bartender. Wealthy anthropologist Sheila Winthrop learns of Peter's deception and tells Martin that she plans to expose the hoax if the book is published. Unaware that his book has been canceled, Peter takes a $10,000 loan from his socialite girl friend, Marcia Stafford, with an offer of marriage as his collateral. Later, Peter meets Sheila, and learns that she plans to go to Lupari Island and bring one of the natives back to New York City. With the help of Orrin, Peter then impersonates a Luparian headhunter named Pangi and becomes Sheila's anthropological subject. Returning to New York, Peter and Orrin make a deal with Martin to write a book about the "headhunter's" life with the Winthrop family. Matters are complicated, however, when Marcia nearly recognizes Peter at a nightclub. Peter is then forced to become a house guest of the Winthrops, and must change back and forth from "Pangi" to himself in order to continue his ruse. Sheila soon begins to fall in love with Peter, despite her engagement to stuffed-shirt Gerald Van Horn, and she confesses these feelings to "Pangi." In a fit of passion, Sheila kisses "Pangi," which brings great disgrace upon the Winthrop family. Peter, in turn, destroys the only copy of his expose of the Winthrops, having fallen in love with Sheila. Meanwhile, Gerald and Marcia combine forces and attempt to bribe Orrin into exposing "Pangi" as a fraud during Sheila's lecture before an anthropological society. Their plot fails, however, when Peter and Orrin bring a real Luparian headhunter to the lecture in "Pangi's" place. Afterward, Peter confesses all, then uses the bribery money to pay back Marcia. Now free of their previous romantic entanglements, Peter and Sheila are united, while Martin, Gerald and Caleb, the Winthrop's gardener, flee for their lives as the real headhunter sets his sites on their craniums.

== Cast ==
- Louise Allbritton as Sheila Winthrop
- Robert Paige as Peter Mathews
- Robert Benchley as Martin Osborne
- Edward Everett Horton as Orrin Tracy
- Helen Broderick as Mrs. Winthrop
- Stephanie Bachelor as Marcia Stafford
- Walter Catlett as Hotel Clerk
- Ernest Truex as Uncle Hubert
- Louis Jean Heydt as Gerald Van Horn
- Nydia Westman as Aunt Penelope
- Oscar O'Shea as Jonathan
- Sylvia Field as Aunt Martha
- Ian Wolfe as Caleb
- Irving Bacon as Mr. Smith
