= Robert Paige =

American actor, newscaster (1911–1987)

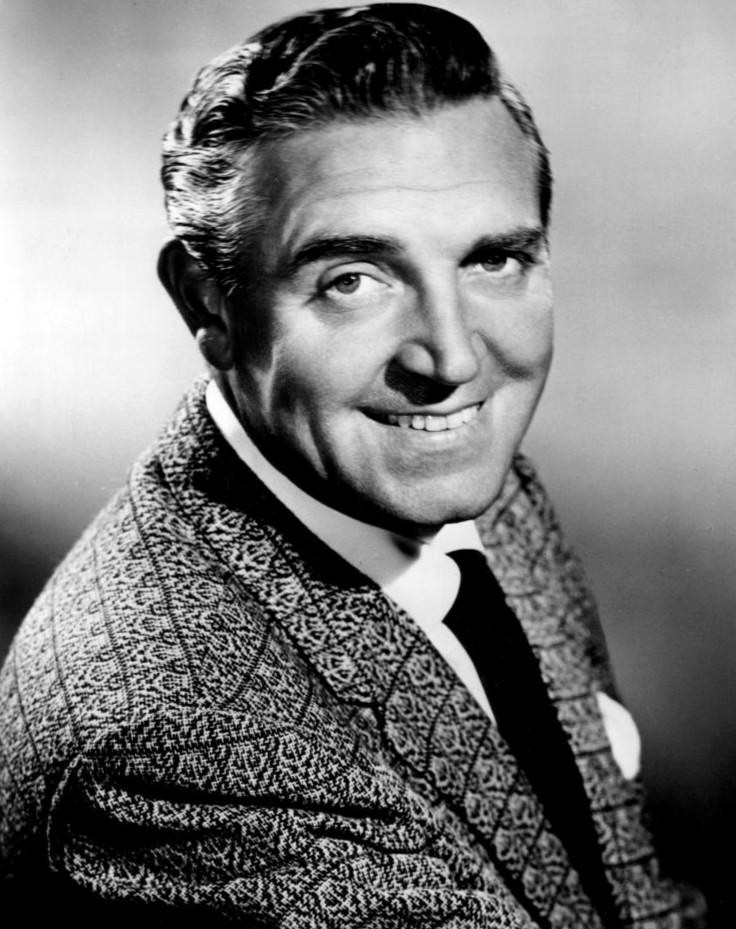
- Paige in 1957
- Born: John Arthur Paige; December 2, 1910; Indianapolis, Indiana, U.S.
- Died: December 21, 1987 (aged 76); San Clemente, California, U.S.
- Resting place: Holy Cross Cemetery Culver City, California
- Occupation: Actor
- Years active: 1934–1963
- Spouses: Betty Henning (m. 1940; div. 1960) Joanne Ludden (m. 1962; div. 1980) Maxine Hoppe (m. 1985)
- Children: 1

Robert Paige (born John Arthur Paige, December 2, 1910 – December 21, 1987) was an American actor who made 65 films in his lifetime. He may be best remembered today for his work in Universal feature films of the 1940s, notably his leading role in the 1943 horror film Son of Dracula. After his screen career he was a TV newscaster and political correspondent.

== Early life ==
Born in Indianapolis, Indiana in 1910, Paige was related to Admiral David Beatty, hero of the World War I Battle of Jutland.

== Education ==
Paige's professional resumestates that he was educated at West Point. Recent research has refuted this: there were only three graduates of the U.S. Military Academy by the name of Paige, and this actor was not one of them. This has been verified by the USMA Register of Graduates.

== Career ==
Robert Paige began his show-business career in radio, where he worked for six years. He began his screen career in 1934, initially billed as David Carlyle to avoid confusion with another rising leading man, John Payne. His handsome features and assured speaking voice earned him prominent roles in motion pictures, such as Cain and Mabel with Clark Gable and Marion Davies. He worked primarily for Warner Brothers and Republic Pictures during this period.

In 1938 he signed a contract with Columbia Pictures, which changed his screen name to Robert Paige. Columbia cast him in "B" features and starred him in one serial, Flying G-Men. These were action pictures that didn't capitalize on his singing voice; when Columbia did allow him to sing, it was to supply uncredited vocals for other male stars. (He dubbed for Charles Starrett in the 1938 college musical Start Cheering.) When the Columbia contract lapsed, Paige moved to Paramount Pictures for one year, and appeared in seven feature films, the most noteworthy being the horror film The Monster and the Girl (1941).

Robert Paige finally found a home in 1941 at Universal Pictures, where he quickly became one of the studio's reliable stars. He played romantic leads in many Universal comedies and musicals, including those of Abbott and Costello, Olsen and Johnson, Gloria Jean, and Hugh Herbert, as well as numerous "B" musicals, often paired with another singer, Jane Frazee. Many of Paige's performances displayed a flair for comedy, lending his romantic roles a breezy charm. Paige left Universal after a corporate shakeup in 1946, when the studio temporarily abandoned its program of light entertainments in favor of serious, artistic films. (Paige would return to Universal years later for one more feature, reuniting with Abbott and Costello in their science-fiction comedy Abbott and Costello Go to Mars.)

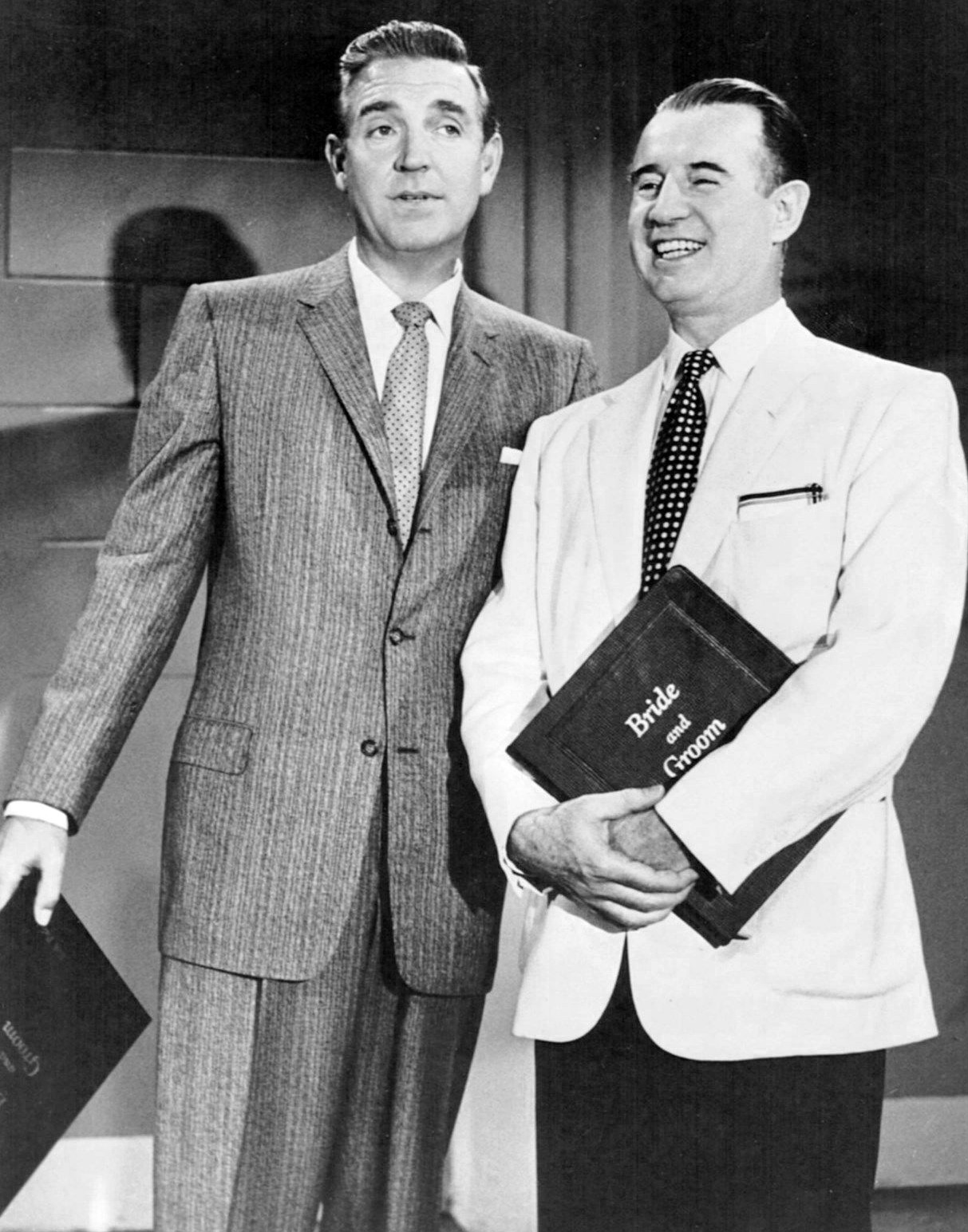
Robert Paige (left) and Frank Parker on Bride and Groom (1957)

Paige became an independent film producer in 1947 and entered the new field of television. He was the last permanent host of NBC's variety series The Colgate Comedy Hour, and won an Emmy in 1955 for "Best Male Personality" (a category that no longer exists). In the 1960s, he became a TV newscaster in Los Angeles at KABC-TV, Channel 7.

Paige continued to work in occasional films through 1963; his last two films were The Marriage-Go-Round (1961) and Bye Bye Birdie (1963). From 1966 to 1970 Paige was a newscaster and political correspondent for ABC News in Los Angeles. He left the news desk to become Deputy Supervisor of Los Angeles under Baxter Ward, and then moved into the public relations field. He retired in the late 1970s.

== Death ==
Robert Paige died from a sudden aortic aneurysm in 1987. He was 76 years old.

== Spouses ==
- Maxine Hoppe (1985–1987; his death)
- Joanne Ludden (1962–1980; divorce); 1 child
- Betty Henning (1940–1960; divorce)

== Children ==
His only child, born when he was in his late 50s, is daughter Colleen Paige, a pet and home lifestyle expert, author, designer and the founder of National Dog Day, and many more philanthropic holidays. She currently resides in Los Angeles, California with her family and a menagerie of pets.

== Filmography ==
- You Can't Buy Everything (1934) as Wedding extra (uncredited)
- Crime of Helen Stanley (1934)
- Annapolis Farewell (1935) as Ensign (uncredited)
- Hearts in Bondage (1936) as Union Lt. Evans (uncredited)
- Cain and Mabel (1936) as Ronny Cauldwell (billed as David Carlyle)
- Rose Bowl (1936) as Football Player (uncredited)
- Smart Blonde (1937) as Lewis Friel (billed as David Carlyle)
- Once a Doctor (1937) as Dr. Burton (billed as David Carlyle)
- Melody for Two (1937) as Mr. Carlson (uncredited)
- The Cherokee Strip (1937) as Tom Valley (billed as David Carlyle)
- Rhythm in the Clouds (1937) as Phil Hale (billed as David Carlyle)
- Meet the Boyfriend (1937) as Tony Page (billed as David Carlyle)
- Talent Scout (1937) as Bert Smith (billed as David Carlyle)
- Sergeant Murphy (1938) as Lt. Duncan (uncredited)
- The Kid Comes Back (1938) as Radio Announcer (billed as David Carlyle)
- Who Killed Gail Preston? (1938) as "Swing" Traynor
- When G-Men Step In (1938) as G-Man Bruce Garth
- There's Always a Woman (1938) as Jerry Marlowe
- The Main Event (1938) as Mac Richards
- Highway Patrol (1938) as William Rolph
- The Lady Objects (1938) as Ken Harper
- I Stand Accused (1938) as Joe Benson
- The Last Warning (1938) as Tony Henderson (billed as Robert Page)
- Homicide Bureau (1939) as Thurston
- Flying G-Men (1939) as Hal Andrews, the Black Falcon
- Death of a Champion (1939) as Alec Temple
- First Love (1939) as Ball Guest (uncredited)
- Emergency Squad (1940) as Chester "Chesty" Miller
- Parole Fixer (1940) as Steve Eddson
- Women Without Names (1940) as Fred MacNeil
- Opened by Mistake (1940) as Jimmie Daniels
- Golden Gloves (1940) as Wally Matson
- Dancing on a Dime (1940) as Ted Brooks
- The Monster and the Girl (1941) as Larry Reed
- The Flame of New Orleans (1941) as Narrator (uncredited)
- San Antonio Rose (1941) as Con Conway
- Melody Lane (1941) as Gabe Morgan
- Hellzapoppin' (1941) as Jeff Hunter
- Don't Get Personal (1942) as Paul Stevens
- Jail House Blues (1942) as Cliff Bailey
- What's Cookin'? (1942) as Bob J. Riley
- You're Telling Me (1942) as Dr. Burnside 'Burnsy' Walker
- Almost Married (1942) as James Manning, III
- Pardon My Sarong (1942) as Tommy Layton
- Get Hep to Love (1942) as Stephen Winters
- How's About It (1943) as George Selby
- Hi'ya, Chum (1943) as Tommy Craig
- Hi, Buddy (1943) as Johnny Blake
- Keep 'Em Slugging (1943, in stock footage from Hi'ya, Chum) as star in moviehouse film (uncredited)
- Cowboy in Manhattan (1943) as Bob Allen
- What We Are Fighting For? (1943, Short) as Karl Baxter, German husband
- Mister Big (1943) as Johnny Hanley
- Get Going (1943) as Bob Carlton
- Frontier Badmen (1943) as Steve Logan
- Fired Wife (1943) as Hank Dunne
- Crazy House (1943) guest appearance as himself
- Son of Dracula (1943) as Frank Stanley
- Her Primitive Man (1944) as Peter Mathews
- Follow the Boys (1944) uncredited guest appearance as himself
- Can't Help Singing (1944) as Lawlor
- Shady Lady (1945) as Bob Wendell
- Tangier (1946) as Paul Kenyon
- The Red Stallion (1947) as Andy McBride
- The Flame (1947) as Barry MacAllister
- Blonde Ice (1948) as Les Burns
- The Green Promise (1949) as David Barkley
- Out There (1951, TV Series)
- Gruen Guild Playhouse (1952, TV Series)
- The Unexpected (1952, TV Series) as Gigolo
- Fireside Theatre (1952–1953, TV Series) as Harrison / Boss / Steven
- The Schaefer Century Theatre (1952, TV Series) as Father
- Abbott and Costello Go to Mars (1953) as Dr. Wilson
- Split Second (1953) as Arthur Ashton
- Lux Video Theatre (1953, TV Series)
- Cavalcade of America (1953, TV Series)
- The Pepsi-Cola Playhouse (1953–1954, TV Series) as The Father / Sam / Roger Libbott
- Four Star Playhouse (1954, TV Series) as Paul Campbell
- The Colgate Comedy Hour (1955, TV Series) as Himself – Host
- Bride and Groom (1957–1958, TV Series)
- The Big Payoff (1958, TV Series) as Himself – Host
- It Happened to Jane (1959) as Bob Paige – Host 'The Big Payoff' (as Bob Paige)
- The Millionaire (1960, TV Series) as Whitney Ames
- The Marriage-Go-Round (1961) as Dr. Ross Barnett
- The Barbara Stanwyck Show (1961, TV Series) as Roger Haines
- Bye Bye Birdie (1963) as Bob Precht (final film role)
