= Get Going =

Film directed by Jean Yarbrough

- Theatrical release poster
- Directed by: Jean Yarbrough
- Screenplay by: Warren Wilson
- Produced by: Will Cowan
- Starring: Robert Paige; Grace McDonald; Barbara Jo Allen; Walter Catlett; Maureen Cannon; Lois Collier; Milburn Stone
- Cinematography: George Robinson
- Edited by: Ray Snyder
- Production company: Universal Pictures
- Distributed by: Universal Pictures
- Release date: June 21, 1943
- Running time: 57 minutes
- Country: United States
- Language: English

Get Going is a 1943 American comedy film directed by Jean Yarbrough and written by Warren Wilson. The film stars Robert Paige, Grace McDonald, Barbara Jo Allen, Walter Catlett, Maureen Cannon, Lois Collier and Milburn Stone. The film was released on June 21, 1943, by Universal Pictures.

== Cast ==
- Robert Paige as Bob Carlton
- Grace McDonald as Judy King
- Barbara Jo Allen as Matilda Jones
- Walter Catlett as Horace Doblem
- Maureen Cannon as Bonnie
- Lois Collier as Doris
- Milburn Stone as Mr. Tuttle
- Frank Faylen as Hank Andrews
- Jennifer Holt as Vilma Walters
- Nana Bryant as Mrs. Daughtery
- Claire Whitney as Secretary
