= Flesh and Fantasy =

1943 film by Julien Duvivier

- Directed by: Julien Duvivier
- Written by: Ellis St. Joseph (Story segment 1); Oscar Wilde (Story segment 2); László Vadnay (Story segment 3); Ernest Pascal; Samuel Hoffenstein
- Starring: Edward G. Robinson; Charles Boyer; Barbara Stanwyck; Betty Field
- Cinematography: Stanley Cortez; Paul Ivano
- Edited by: Arthur Hilton
- Music by: Alexandre Tansman
- Distributed by: Universal Pictures
- Release dates: November 17, 1943 (New York); December 9, 1943 (Los Angeles)
- Running time: 94 minutes
- Country: United States
- Language: English
- Box office: $1.8 million (U.S. rentals)

Flesh and Fantasy is a 1943 American horror fantasy film directed by Julien Duvivier and starring Edward G. Robinson, Charles Boyer, Robert Cummings and Barbara Stanwyck. The film follows the success of Duvivier's previous anthology film Tales of Manhattan (1942). Flesh and Fantasy tells three stories, unrelated but with a supernatural theme, written by Ellis St. Joseph, Oscar Wilde and László Vadnay. Interstitial scenes to connect and present the three segments feature humorist Robert Benchley.

== Plot ==
=== First segment ===
In New Orleans, ugly and embittered young woman Henrietta secretly loves law student Michael. On Mardi Gras night, a mysterious stranger gives her a white mask of beauty that she must return at midnight. At a party, Michael falls in love with Henrietta but has yet to see her face under the mask. He implores her to remove the mask, assuring her that he will love her no matter what. Henrietta encourages Michael to follow a better life although it may mean losing him forever. Henrietta removes the mask at midnight to reveal that she is now beautiful and that her old, selfish attitude was the true cause of her ugliness. The man who gave her the mask is a figment of her imagination.

=== Second segment ===
The second story is based on Oscar Wilde's short story "Lord Arthur Savile's Crime". A palmist named Septimus Podgers delivers uncannily accurate predictions at a party for the rich and bored. He warns skeptical lawyer Marshall Tyler to avoid a specific street intersection on his way home. Marshall eschews the advice and is nearly shot during a police chase at the intersection. Marshall visits Podgers, who tells him that he will commit murder. The notion obsesses Marshall, who resolves to kill someone to fulfill the prediction and this become free of it. He comes close to killing two people but is unable to do so. He finally meets Podgers by accident on a bridge one night, and blaming Podgers for his problem, strangles him to death in a rage. Trying to escape, Marshall is hit by a car. The accident is witnessed by the Paul Gaspar, a high-wire artist.

=== Third segment ===
High-wire artist Paul Gaspar is haunted by dreams of falling, and in each dream of doom, he encounters a woman named Joan Stanley, whom he has never met. The dreams affect his performance as he is frightened to complete the most dangerous stunt, jumping from one wire to another without a net. He eventually meets his dream girl, but she has serious troubles of her own. Paul later resolves that he will not allow his bad dreams to affect him and that his life is his own. He performs the stunt successfully, not knowing that the woman with whom he has fallen in love with is soon to be arrested.

== Cast ==
- Edward G. Robinson as Marshall Tyler
- Charles Boyer as Paul Gaspar
- Barbara Stanwyck as Joan Stanley
- Betty Field as Henrietta
- Robert Cummings as Michael
- Thomas Mitchell as Septimus Podgers
- Charles Winninger as King Lamarr
- Robert Benchley as Doakes
- C. Aubrey Smith as Dean of Norwald
- Edgar Barrier as Proprietor of the Mask Shop

== Production ==
The film's working title was For All We Know. Robert Cummings and Betty Field were cast in March 1943.

A 30-minute segment concerning an escaped killer (Alan Curtis) who finds refuge with a farmer (Frank Craven) and his blind daughter (Gloria Jean) was produced but not included in the final film. Warner Bros. contract star John Garfield had been loaned to Universal for the lead role, but he refused the part because he would only consider assignments that had relevance to the current war effort. Garfield was suspended by Warner Bros. and replaced by Curtis. Universal had cast 16-year-old former child star Jean in order to begin her transition to mature roles. The sequence was filmed after the Edward G. Robinson and Charles Boyer segments but before the filming of the Mardi Gras segment.

The deleted segment ended with a spectacular storm scene in which the enraged killer races after the girl. Preview audience reacted positively to the scene, but Universal removed and shelved it. The end of the deleted scene survives in the final print, in which the killer's body is shown reaching the shore. To replace the excised footage, the studio connected the remaining three segments with scenes featuring humorist Robert Benchley.

Universal hired screenwriter Roy Chanslor to devise additional material and Reginald LeBorg to direct several new scenes so that the removed segment could be released as a separate feature film. The studio demanded new framing sequences to depict the refugee as innocent of the crimes for which he has been imprisoned and to provide a happy ending. The completed film was released in 1944 as Destiny.

== Reception ==
In a contemporary review for The New York Times, critic Thomas M. Pryor wrote: "It is in the film's conception and script that its shortcomings lie. Still it is, as they say, 'different.' And even if the stories do not come off as well as they might, there is a great deal to be said for the picture's variety. In short, 'Flesh and Fantasy' is as stuffing and diversified as a four-decker sandwich, complete with mayonnaise and coleslaw."

Critic Edwin Schallert of the Los Angeles Times wrote: "What actually happens during the sequences is not always what the individual characters anticipate will happen from their forebodings. It's a rather nebulous set of motifs that are presented in the film. These will find some observers, who like the occult, going all out for the picture, but the majority, perhaps, not so won over. 'Flesh and Fantasy' will, however, not fail to evoke discussion."
