= Gals, Incorporated =

Film directed by Leslie Goodwins

- Theatrical release poster
- Directed by: Leslie Goodwins
- Screenplay by: Edward Dein
- Story by: Dave Gould; Charles R. Marion
- Produced by: Will Cowan
- Starring: Leon Errol; Harriet Nelson; Grace McDonald; David Bacon; Betty Kean; Maureen Cannon; Lillian Cornell
- Cinematography: Jerome Ash
- Edited by: Arthur Hilton
- Production company: Universal Pictures
- Distributed by: Universal Pictures
- Release date: July 9, 1943
- Running time: 60 minutes
- Country: United States
- Language: English

Gals, Incorporated is a 1943 American comedy film directed by Leslie Goodwins and written by Edward Dein. The film stars Leon Errol, Harriet Nelson, Grace McDonald, David Bacon, Betty Kean, Maureen Cannon and Lillian Cornell. The film was released on July 9, 1943, by Universal Pictures. The film included the singing group The Pied Pipers.

== Cast ==
- Leon Errol as Cornelius Rensington III
- Harriet Nelson as Gwen Phillips
- Grace McDonald as Molly
- David Bacon as Bill Rensington
- Betty Kean as Bets Moran
- Maureen Cannon as Bubbles
- Lillian Cornell as Vicki
- Minna Phillips as Jennifer Rensington
- Marion Daniels as Virginia
- Jo Stafford as Member of The Pied Pipers
- Chuck Lowry as Member of The Pied Pipers
- John Huddleston as Member of The Pied Pipers
- Clark Yocum as Member of The Pied Pipers
- Glen Gray as himself
