= Half a Sinner (1940 film) =

1940 film by Al Christie

- Original film poster
- Directed by: Al Christie
- Written by: Frederick J. Jackson
- Story by: Dalton Trumbo ("Lady Takes a Chance")
- Produced by: Al Christie (uncredited); Jack H. Skirball (uncredited)
- Starring: Heather Angel; John "Dusty" King
- Cinematography: Charles Van Enger
- Edited by: Barney Rogan
- Production company: Arcadia Pictures
- Distributed by: Universal Pictures
- Release date: April 5, 1940
- Running time: 59 minutes
- Country: United States
- Language: English

Half a Sinner is a 1940 American comedy crime film directed by Al Christie. It stars Heather Angel as a schoolteacher who in one day becomes Public Enemy Number One in Pennsylvania. The film is based on Dalton Trumbo's short story "Lady Takes a Chance". The working titles of this film were Everything Happens to Ann and The Lady Takes a Chance.

== Plot ==
On the last day of the school year, plain 25-year-old teacher Anne Gladden has her student Willy write punishment lines on the blackboard. After the class is dismissed, she releases the boy and tells him that few can do what they want in life, so they might as well make the best of what they have. She is overheard by Margaret Ree, an older teacher. Margaret tells Anne that she regrets not doing wild things when she was young. She advises Anne to do what she never did and Anne decides to take her advice for one day.

She buys a pretty dress and hosiery and releases her pet canary. Sitting in a public park, Anne is propositioned by "Handsome", a persistent guy who will not go away. Anne finally knocks him down and drives off in his car. Handsome turns out to be a killer, he stole the car she is in and on the floor of the back seat is a body, that he and his partner Red, have murdered. Slick, their boss, is displeased when he learns that the body is hidden under his overcoat, which has a label with his name on it. Slick gives Red ten hours to get the coat back, or else. The police are also looking for the stolen vehicle. Unaware of any of this, Anne picks up a man named Larry Cameron, whose car has broken down.

Police officer Kelly spots the car and gives chase, but Anne manages to lose him. They head to the local country club for refreshments. Larry turns out to know far more about Anne's predicament than she does, pointing out that she has a corpse in the back seat. Snuffy, a snitch, runs into Red and tells him he found the car he is looking for. After Red leaves, Snuffy telephones Kelly. When Larry sees Kelly by the car, he points Red out as the driver. While Kelly is chasing Red, Larry and Anne drive away.

They stop for gas at a station. The attendant recognizes them as fugitives, but Larry ties him up. A rich elderly woman, Mrs Breckenbridge, pulls up in her chauffeur-driven limousine and while they are distracted, Larry switches license plates.

Then Larry and Anne break into an empty house, but Red and Handsome track them down. Fortunately, Larry manages to knock Red out and Handsome runs away after Anne burns him with a cigarette. Mrs Breckenbridge also shows up, after an encounter with Kelly. It comes out that they "broke into" Larry's home; the car is also Larry's. Despite Anne's assumption, he is not a crook. When the pair return the car to the park for the police to find, two other gang members take them at gunpoint to Slick. Then Mrs Breckenbridge bursts in. She was following in her car and, when she saw her friends being captured, sent her chauffeur for the police, who arrive and capture the gang.

Afterward, Anne tells Granny Gladden that she and Larry are getting married. Granny tells her that her canary has returned too, also with a companion.

== Cast ==
- Heather Angel as Anne Gladden
- John "Dusty" King as Larry Cameron
- Constance Collier as Mrs. Jefferson Breckenbridge
- Walter Catlett as Station Attendant
- Tom Dugan as Red [Egan]
- Robert Elliott as Officer Kelly
- Clem Bevans as Snuffy
- Emma Dunn as Granny Gladden
- Henry Brandon as Handsome
- William B. Davidson as Slick [Kopesco]
- Fern Emmett as Margaret Reed
- Sonny Bupp as Willy
- Wilbur Mack as Mason
- Joe Devlin as Steve [Kopesco henchman]

== Production ==
The film is Dalton Trumbo's second screen credit and the last of Jack Skirball's Arcadia Pictures. Skirball, an ordained rabbi, later produced Alfred Hitchcock's Shadow of a Doubt. The film started production in February 1939 and was to be released by Grand National Films. After the 1939 demise of Grand National, the completed film was picked up for release by Universal Pictures.

This film was the last under King's Universal Pictures contract.
