= Paul Ivano =

Serbian–French–American cinematographer

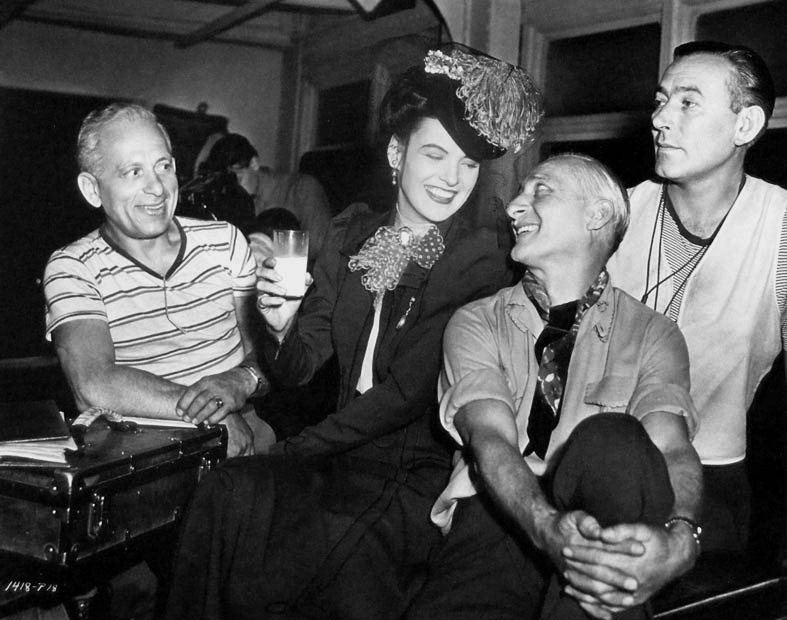
- Ivano (right) with camera assistants Robert Lazlo and Frank Heisler and Ella Raines on the set of The Suspect (1944)
- Born: Pavle Ivanišević (Romanized Serbian); May 13, 1900; Nice, France
- Died: April 9, 1984 (aged 83); Woodland Hills, California
- Occupation: Cinematographer
- Spouse: Margaret (Greta) Ginsburg Ivano

Paul Ivano, ASC (born Pavle Ivanišević, May 13, 1900 – April 9, 1984), was a Serbian-French-American cinematographer whose career stretched from 1920 into the late 1960s.

Born Pavle Ivanišević to Serbian parents in Nice, France, where the name was transcribed/recorded as "Paul Ivano Ivanichévitch", he served for two years with the Franco-American Ambulance Corps and the American Red Cross Ambulance Corps from 1916 to 1918. After the conclusion of World War I, he remained in the Balkans, acting as a photographer and interpreter for the American Red Cross. He arrived in the United States in 1919, and moved to California, the following year.

He began his Hollywood career on the crew of a Rudolph Valentino film, and became established as a reliable second-unit cameraman for major features and principal cameraman for minor ones. Among his second-unit credits are Ben-Hur, Hell's Angels, and Gone with the Wind. His most prestigious credit of the 1920s was Queen Kelly (1928), director Erich von Stroheim's last personal project, starring Gloria Swanson and highlighting Paul Ivano's luminous photography.

Director Julien Duvivier engaged Ivano to photograph Universal's all-star dramatic feature Flesh and Fantasy (1943). A half-hour sequence with Gloria Jean as a blind girl was removed from the film and made into its own feature, Destiny; Paul Ivano received screen credit for the Flesh and Fantasy segment. Duvivier left the studio but Ivano stayed on, filming Universal's comedies, musicals, and mysteries until the studio changed hands in 1946. After his tenure at Universal, Ivano signed on with independent producers.

Ivano had filmed the aerial scenes for the 1930 feature Hell's Angels; in 1947, he captured the first-ever aerial helicopter shots for an American feature film in Nicholas Ray's film noir They Live by Night.

Beginning in 1951, Paul Ivano was much in demand in the new field of television. His first series was Mark Saber. He often worked for producer Hal Roach during the 1950s, especially for the Telephone Time series. His other long-term assignments were for The Texan starring Rory Calhoun and Family Affair starring Brian Keith.

Paul Ivano worked steadily until his retirement in 1969. He was interviewed about his silent-era career for the Kevin Brownlow-David Gill series Hollywood (1980).

== Select filmography ==
Cinematographer
| Year | Film | Genre | Other notes |
|---|---|---|---|
| 1951 | Gold Raiders | western | independent production |
| 1950 | Champagne for Caesar | comedy | independent production |
| 1949 | Search for Danger | The Falcon mystery | independent production |
| 1945 | Pursuit to Algiers | Sherlock Holmes mystery | |
| 1945 | The Strange Affair of Uncle Harry | film noir | director of photography |
| 1945 | The Frozen Ghost | Inner Sanctum mystery | |
| 1945 | Senorita from the West | | |
| 1944 | Destiny | drama | incorporates Ivano's unused sequences from Flesh and Fantasy |
| 1944 | The Suspect | | director of photography |
| 1944 | The Impostor | | |
| 1943 | Flesh and Fantasy | episodic drama | |
| 1936 | The Plow That Broke the Plains | documentary film, selected in 1999, to be preserved in the U.S. National Film Registry | cinematography (uncredited) |
| 1929 | Queen Kelly | | a film by Erich von Stroheim |
| 1921 | The Four Horsemen of the Apocalypse | | top-grossing film of 1921 |

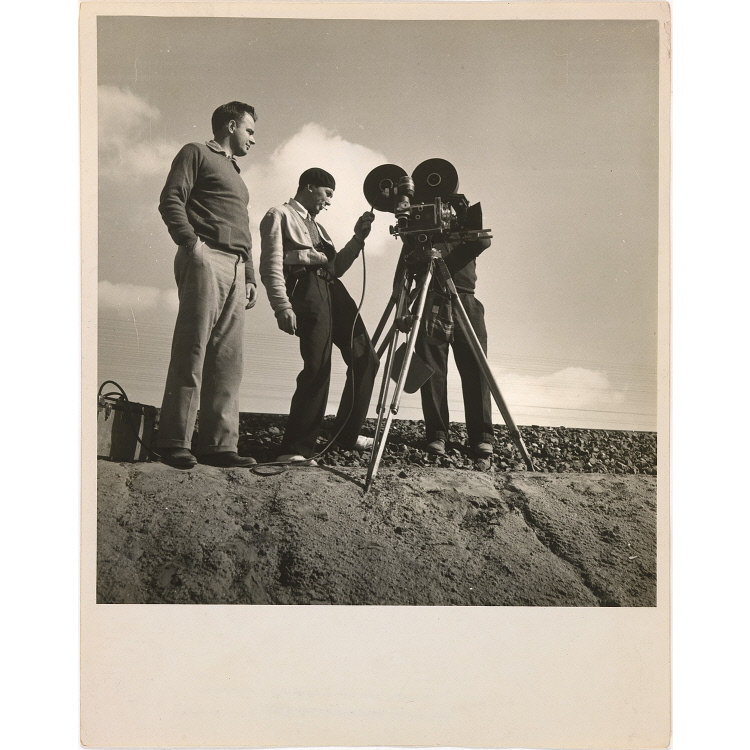
Dorothea Lange photograph of Paul Ivano, beside the camera at center, and documentary film pioneer Pare Lorentz, at left, in October 1935, near Bakersfield, California, at work on The Plow That Broke the Plains

== Television ==
- Mark Saber
- Waterfront
- My Little Margie
- Telephone Time
- The Texan
- Please Don't Eat the Daisies
- The Man from U.N.C.L.E.
- Daktari
- Family Affair
