= Riders of the Purple Sage (disambiguation) =

Riders of the Purple Sage may refer to:

== Books ==
- Riders of the Purple Sage, the original novel by Zane Grey

== Films ==
- Riders of the Purple Sage (1918 film), starring William Farnum
- Riders of the Purple Sage (1925 film), starring Tom Mix
- Riders of the Purple Sage (1931 film), starring George O'Brien
- Riders of the Purple Sage (1941 film), starring George Montgomery
- Riders of the Purple Sage (1996 film), starring Ed Harris

== Music ==
- Riders of the Purple Sage (band), three Western music bands
- New Riders of the Purple Sage, an American country rock band

== Similar titles ==
- Riders of the Purple Wage, a 1967 science fiction novella by Philip José Farmer
- Writer of the Purple Rage, a 1994 collection of short works by Joe R. Lansdale
