= Sons o' Fun =

Musical by Sammy Fain and Jack Yellen

- Carmen Miranda and the cast of Sons O' Fun
- Music: Sammy Fain; Jack Yellen
- Lyrics: Sammy Fain; Jack Yellen
- Book: Harold "Chic" Johnson; John "Ole" Olsen; Hal Block
- Productions: 1941 Broadway

Sons o' Fun is a musical revue written by the comedy team of Olsen and Johnson, consisting of John "Ole" Olsen and Harold "Chic" Johnson, also starring Ella Logan and Carmen Miranda, with music and lyrics by Sammy Fain and Jack Yellen. The revue ran on Broadway from December 1, 1941, through August 29, 1943.

== Production ==
Sons o' Fun opened at the Winter Garden Theatre on December 1, 1941, and remained there until March 29, 1943, when it transferred to the 46th Street Theatre, remaining there until the show's closing on August 29, 1943. The musical was directed by Lee and J.J. Shubert and produced by Eddie Dowling. It ran for a total of 742 performances. It included performances by The Blackburn Twins.
