= George Mann (vaudeville performer) =

American actor (1905–1997)

George Kline Mann
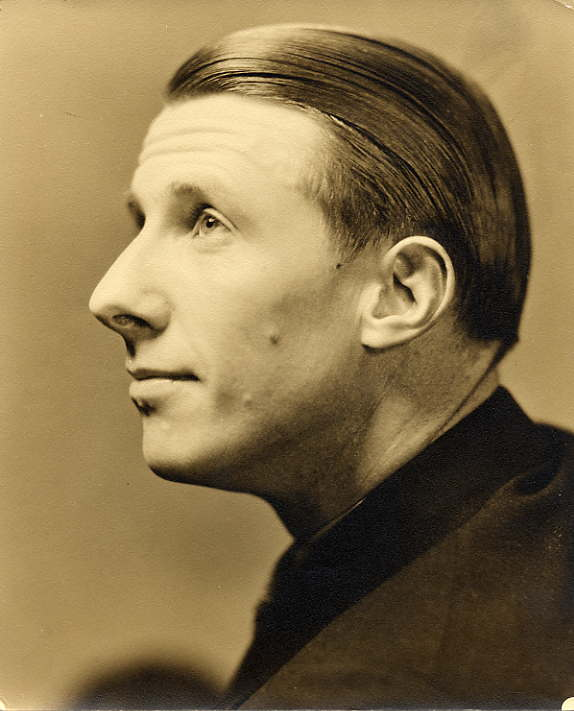
- Self-portrait, circa 1940
- Born: George Kline Mann; December 2, 1905; Hollywood, California
- Died: November 22, 1977 (aged 71); Santa Monica, California
- Occupations: Vaudevillian and Photographer

George Kline Mann (December 2, 1905 – November 22, 1977) was best known as the taller half of the comedic and acrobatic dance act Barto and Mann.

== Early life ==
Mann was born in Hollywood, California. His father, George "Mack" Mann, moved to California from Cassopolis, Michigan, in the late 19th century and worked as a construction superintendent of railroad bridges. His mother, Jean (Kline) Mann, was also from Cassopolis. Mack and Jean met and married in Los Angeles, California.

George Mann grew up in the Silver Lake area of Los Angeles, moving to Santa Monica as a teenager with his parents. George was listed as the "Snaps Editor" as well as being responsible for all of the photography in the Athletic section of the Venice Union Polytechnic High High School 1925 Annual, The Gondolier. He was Vice President of the Junior A Class that would graduate in June 1926, but didn't graduate with his class. During his junior year, he was vice-president of the drama club and had a leading role in the play, "What Happened to Jones" with Irene Hervey, then Irene Herwick. He played center on the varsity basketball team and was a member of the swimming team.

== Early career ==
George studied dance with Roy Randolph of the Randolph's La Monica Dance School in Santa Monica, California. Shortly after turning 20, he developed a dance act - Mann & Clark - with his high school friend Lester Clark. Signing with the William Meiklejohn Agency, they performed together in Los Angeles for three or four months before George signed on as a single with Fanchon and Marco enterprises. George (6'6") was soon performing for comedic effect with a much shorter (4'11") Dewey Barto (father of the comedian Nancy Walker). Two days after George turned 21, George and Dewey signed a ten-year contract with Fanchon and Marco as the comedy team Barto and Mann.

== Barto and Mann ==
During 1926, they performed up and down the West Coast of the United States until William Morris of the William Morris Agency booked them “cold" (having never appeared on the East Coast of the United States) into the Palace Theatre on March 14, 1927, during its celebration of vaudeville's 100th anniversary. They were a great success. With offers from all the major vaudeville circuits, they chose to sign with the Orpheum Circuit, with whom they toured across the U.S. until they signed with the Earl Carroll's Vanities from August 1928 to February 1929. They continued touring in the U.S. and Canada, with European tours in the summers of 1931 and 1934.

George met Barbara Bradford, a top model at the John Robert Powers modeling agency, in March 1936. They were married in June 1937. In 1938, George and Barbara appeared in a very short film directed by George starring The Three Stooges. George and Barbara had one son, Brad, born in February 1941. George and Barbara were divorced in June 1943. George never remarried.

As vaudeville faded, Barto & Mann joined the Broadway cast of Ole Olsen and Chic Johnson's Hellzapoppin, with featured billing from 1938 through 1942. The team split up in December 1943 when George began working for Douglas Aircraft Company providing entertainment for Douglas employees, but worked together again briefly to perform with the USO.

== Photographer ==
Following World War II, George acted in small roles in several movies, on the stage, and with Jack Carson's stage revue but primarily devoted himself to making a living with photography, an activity he had pursued actively while in vaudeville when he took about 12,000 black and white photographs, many of them demonstrating an extraordinary skill and aesthetic sensibility. He also took thousands of feet of B&W and color 16mm film.

In the late 1940s, George began a period of invention, first designing and obtaining a patent for an endless magnetic loop recording and playback device, elements of which were later incorporated into the Lear Jet Stereo 8 track cartridge player. George and Bill Lear became close friends after George introduced Bill to his future wife, Ole Olsen's daughter Moya. George next turned his inventive and mechanical skills to designing a 3D viewer that would display the 3D photographs he was taking with his 35mm Stereo Realist cameras, mostly around Southern California. He leased the viewers to various businesses, including restaurants, and doctor's offices where people sometimes had to wait for service. Every couple of weeks, George would swap out the 3D photographs of such places as Calico Ghost Town, Catalina Island, Descanso Gardens, Disneyland, Knott's Berry Farm, Pacific Ocean Park, Watts Towers, Palm Springs, Salton Sea or Las Vegas. He also leased his viewers to bars in Los Angeles with photographs of nude pinups he had taken.

== King Vitaman ==
In the early 1970s, George was hired by Quaker Oats to portray King Vitaman in commercials and on the front of the King Vitaman cereal box.

George Mann lived in Santa Monica, California, at the time of his death on November 23, 1977, at age 71.

== Selected filmography ==
- Broadway Thru a Keyhole (1933) himself, as member of the Barto and Mann comedy team
- Where Do We Go from Here? (1945) - (uncredited)
- Two Sisters from Boston (1946) - Tall Assistant (uncredited)
- Easy to Wed (1946) - Theodore - Homer Henshaw's Assistant (uncredited)
- The Yearling (1946) - Pack Forrester (uncredited)
- Undercover Maisie (1947) - Hawkins, Tall Deadpan (uncredited)
- The Senator Was Indiscreet (1947) - Texan (as George K. Mann)
- Neptune's Daughter (1949) - Tall Wrangler
- Too Late for Tears (1949) - Man in Cowboy Hat (uncredited)
- Cold Turkey (1971) - Bishop Manley
- The Steagle (1971) - Dean Briggs
- Bedknobs and Broomsticks (1971) - Old Home Guardsman (uncredited)
- Charge of the Model T's (1977) - Rancher (final film role)

== See also ==
- Barto and Mann
- Dewey Barto
- Hellzapoppin
