= Country Gentlemen (film) =

1936 film by Ralph Staub

- Directed by: Ralph Staub
- Written by: Jo Graham (story); Jack Harvey (story); Joseph Hoffman; John P. Medbury (additional dialogue); Gertrude Orr; Milton Raison (story)
- Produced by: Nat Levine (producer); Herman Schlom (associate producer)
- Starring: See below
- Cinematography: Ernest Miller
- Edited by: Ernest J. Nims
- Distributed by: Republic Pictures
- Release date: 1936
- Running time: 66 minutes 53 minutes (edited version)
- Country: United States
- Language: English

Country Gentlemen is a 1936 American comedy film directed by Ralph Staub for Republic Pictures with the comedy duo of Olsen and Johnson.

== Plot summary ==
Two swindlers, their Gracie Allen type secretary and her Great Dane named Fluffy are on the run and end up in the small town of Chesterville. Though Ole wishes to give up the dishonest life and settle in the small town with hotel owner Louise and her son, they sense the smell of money when a Veteran's Home is built in the town and they can swindle the ex-soldiers of their bonuses. Things expand with a scheme in selling shares in an oil exploration project.

== Cast ==
- Ole Olsen as J.D. McAllister, aka Jerome D. Hamilton
- Chic Johnson as Charles Watson, aka Charlie "Chubby" Williams
- Joyce Compton as Gertie
- Lila Lee as Mrs. Louise Heath
- Pierre Watkin as Mr. Grayson
- Donald Kirke as Mr. Martin
- Ray Corrigan as Briggs
- Sammy McKim as Billy Heath
- Wade Boteler as First Deputy
- Ivan Miller as Harry, Second Deputy
- Olin Howland as Lawyer
- Frank Sheridan as Chief of Police
- Harry Harvey as Shorty, an Investor
- Joe Cunningham as Chuck, the Counterman
- Prince as Fluffy (the Great Dane)
