= All Over Town =

1937 film by James W. Horne

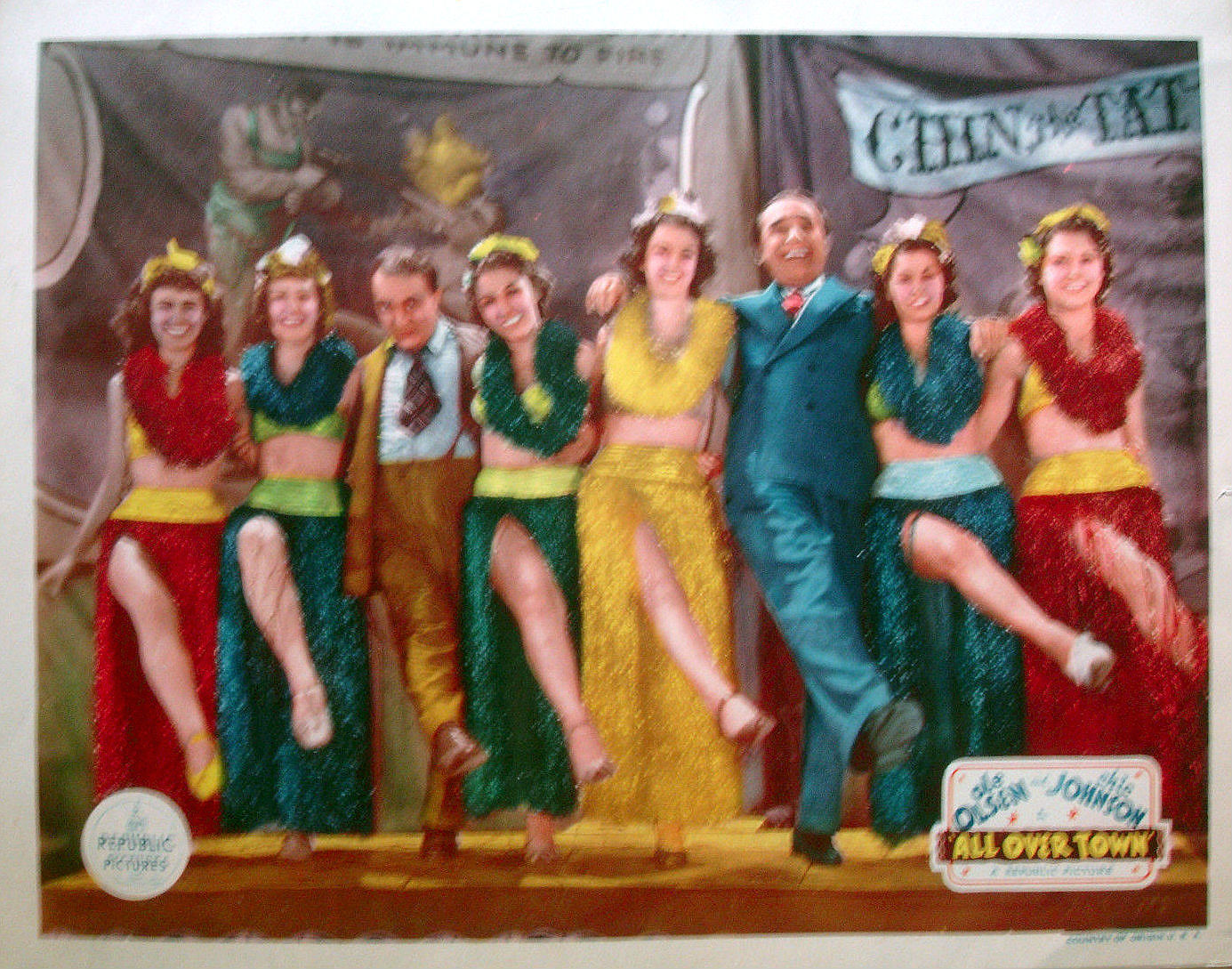
- Lobby card
- Directed by: James W. Horne
- Written by: Jerome Chodorov; Richard English; James Parrott; Jack Townley
- Produced by: Leonard Fields
- Starring: Ole Olsen; Chic Johnson; Mary Howard
- Cinematography: Ernest Miller
- Edited by: Howard O'Neill
- Music by: Alberto Colombo
- Production company: Republic Pictures
- Distributed by: Republic Pictures
- Release date: August 10, 1937
- Running time: 63 minutes
- Country: United States
- Language: English

All Over Town is a 1937 American comedy film directed by James W. Horne and starring Olsen and Johnson alongside Mary Howard, Harry Stockwell and James Finlayson. It was produced and distributed by Republic Pictures.

== Cast ==
- Ole Olsen as Olsen
- Chic Johnson as Johnson
- Mary Howard as Joan Eldridge
- Harry Stockwell as Don Fletcher
- Franklin Pangborn as The Costumer
- James Finlayson as MacDougal
- Eddie Kane as William Bailey
- Stanley Fields as Slug
- D'Arcy Corrigan as Davenport
- Lew Kelly as Martin
- John Sheehan as McKee
- Earle Hodgins as Barker
- Gertrude Astor as Mamie
- Blanche Payson as Mother Wilson, Landlady
- Otto Hoffman as Peter Stuyvesant "Pete" Phillips
- Fred Kelsey as Inspector Murphy
- Charlie Becker in a bit part (uncredited)
- Alan Ladd as Young Man

== Bibliography ==
- Etling, Laurence. Radio in the Movies: A History and Filmography, 1926–2010. McFarland, 2011.
- Alan G. Fetrow. Sound Films, 1927-1939: a United States Filmography. McFarland, 1992.
