= Fireball Fun for All =

American television comedy-variety program

- Genre: Variety
- Directed by: Ezra Stone
- Music by: Al Goodman; Charles Sanford
- Country of origin: United States

Production
- Producer: Ezra Stone

Original release
- Network: NBC
- Release: June 28 – October 27, 1949

Fireball Fun for All is an American television comedy-variety program that was broadcast on NBC from June 28, 1949 to October 27, 1949. Hooper Ratings for July 1949 showed the program leading all TV shows with a rating of 46.2.

== Format and personnel ==
Debuting as a summer replacement for Texaco Star Theater, the program was hosted by the comedy team of Olsen and Johnson and featured slapstick comedy and sight gags. Viewers saw sights that included baboons, beautiful girls, collapsing stages, explosions, leopard men, midgets, and wild costumes.

The show was based on the duo's "extravaganza that made them world-famous", Hellzapoppin. Regulars on the program were Ole Olsen, Chick Johnson, Bill Hayes, Marty May, June Johnson, J. C. Olsen, and The Buick Belles. Al Goodman's orchestra initially provided music. In July that group was replaced by Charles Sanford's orchestra.

The premiere episode had a mobile TV unit stationed outside the theater, with announcer May greeting celebrities as they arrived for the broadcast.

== Critical reception ==
Fireball brought many elements of Hellzapoppin to TV. In the process of doing so, media historian Hal Erickson wrote, "the traditions of the 'standard' variety program were blown to pieces". In his book "From Beautiful Downtown Burbank": A Critical History of Rowan and Martin's Laugh-In, 1968-1973, Erickson described the opening sequence of one episode:

An attractive singing ensemble, suddenly enveloped by smoke, begins screaming as the stage trembles earthquake-style. When the smoke clears, the curtain rises (carrying a struggling chorus girl with it) to reveal a brick wall, which in turn is smashed down by Olsen and Johnson, who shout belligerently "All right — who locked the front door?

Erickson attributed the program's lack of success to Olsen and Johnson's failure to adapt their comedy style to the constraints of television receivers of that era. He wrote that Milton Berle "learned early on to scale his performance down to television level without losing any of his essential raw energy" but Olsen and Johnson did not do so.

Will Jones, writing in the Minneapolis Morning Tribune after having seen a kinescope of the first episode of the show, commented, "Milton Berle now has a television rival". He added, however, "And there's some question how long they'll be able to hold the pace," noting that so much activity was packed into the hour-long show that it seemed more like a half-hour.

A review in Radio and Television Best magazine noted a change in the program after the first two episodes, which "consisted of nothing but brash pie-in-the-face kind of stuff" that kept the reviewer "annoyed to chagrin". The third broadcast, however, was described as better organized with improved performances, including a dance team, a tumbling trio, and a medley by the program's singers.

== Production ==
Fireball Fun for All was broadcast from the Center Theatre in New York City. Ezra Stone produced and directed. Eddie Cline was assistant director for the last five episodes. Don Walker orchestrated the music. Dave Gould was choreographer for four weeks. The program used five cameras and was sponsored by General Motors.
