= Crazy House (1943 film) =

1943 film by Edward F. Cline

- Theatrical poster
- Directed by: Edward F. Cline
- Written by: Robert Lees; Frederic I. Rinaldo
- Produced by: Erle C. Kenton
- Starring: Ole Olsen; Chic Johnson; Cass Daley
- Cinematography: Charles Van Enger
- Edited by: Arthur Hilton
- Music by: George Hale
- Distributed by: Universal Pictures
- Release dates: October 8, 1943 (U.S.); May 22, 1944 (Sweden); July 31, 1950 (Denmark)
- Running time: 80 min.
- Country: United States
- Language: English
- Box office: $1 million (US rentals)

Crazy House is a 1943 comedy film starring Ole Olsen and Chic Johnson, directed by Edward F. Cline.

Crazy House is notable for its cast of supporting comedians (Percy Kilbride, Cass Daley, Shemp Howard, Edgar Kennedy, Franklin Pangborn, Billy Gilbert, Richard Lane, Andrew Tombes, Chester Clute, and Hans Conried) and guest stars under contract to Universal at the time (Allan Jones, Basil Rathbone and Nigel Bruce, Robert Paige, Leo Carrillo, Johnny Mack Brown, and Andy Devine).

== Plot ==
Two Broadway stars return to Universal Studios to make another movie. The mere mention of Olsen and Johnson's names evacuates the studio and terrorizes the management and personnel. Undaunted, the comedians hire an assistant director and unknown talent, and set out to make their own movie. Financed by an eccentric "angel", the completed feature is set to premiere when angry creditors confiscate most of the film. Olsen and Johnson keep the preview going anyway and their venture is a success; but only because the team gives the president of their former studio a hotfoot to trick him into standing up and "bidding" for the film.

== Cast ==
- Ole Olsen as himself
- Chic Johnson as himself
- Cass Daley as herself and her stand-in, Sadie Silverfish
- Martha O'Driscoll as Marjorie Nelson, alias Marjorie Wyndingham
- Patric Knowles as Edmund "Mac" MacLean
- Percy Kilbride as Col. Cornelius Merriweather
- Hans Conried as Roco, set designer
- Leighton Noble as himself, bandleader
- Richard Lane as Hanley, production broker
- Thomas Gomez as N. G. Wagstaff, Universal executive
- Billy Gilbert as Sid Drake, offering camera rentals
- Edgar Kennedy as Judge
- Andrew Tombes as Horace L. Gregory, offering laboratory services
- Chester Clute as Mr. Fud, offering costume rentals
- Franklin Pangborn as hotel clerk
- Shemp Howard as Mumbo
- Fred Sanborn as Jumbo
- Joseph Crehan as Wagstaff's doctor
- Count Basie Orchestra with Jimmy Rushing and Thelma Carpenter
- The Delta Rhythm Boys
- Ray Walker as radio host at drive-in
- James Dime as dead end character
- Cameo appearances by Allan Jones, Leo Carrillo, Andy Devine, Basil Rathbone, Nigel Bruce, Johnny Mack Brown, Robert Paige, Ramsay Ames

== Reception ==
Crazy House was the first of three Olsen & Johnson vehicles following up the success of their 1941 film Hellzapoppin'. The team's wild style of comedy had always been a matter of taste, more for "plain folks" than sophisticates, and contemporary exhibitor reports ran the gamut: "Just made for small towns. Some people said it was the best picture we had shown in months." (F. R. Crist, Crist Theatre, Loveland, Ohio.) "These boys are not appreciated here. However, it was played to average business and drew many laughs from those who came in." (C. A. Smith, Regent Theatre, Chapleau, Ontario.) "This picture is just what the name implies. We did below average business and I received no favorable comments from my patrons." (Charles A. Brooks, Ritz Theatre, Marshfield, Missouri.) "This is the first Olsen and Johnson I've ever played and it's the last. This feature is terrible." (O. E. Simon, Roxy Theatre, Menno, South Dakota.)

The film did well in first-run engagements, grossing more than one million dollars. However, the high budget cut into the profit margin, so Universal economized on Olsen & Johnson's next two features, Ghost Catchers and See My Lawyer.
