= Riders of the Purple Sage (1941 film) =

1941 film by James Tinling

- Directed by: James Tinling
- Screenplay by: William Bruckner; Robert F. Metzler
- Based on: Riders of the Purple Sage; 1912 novel by Zane Grey
- Produced by: Sol M. Wurtzel
- Starring: George Montgomery; Mary Howard; Robert Barrat
- Cinematography: Lucien N. Andriot
- Edited by: Nick DeMaggio
- Music by: Cyril J. Mockridge
- Production company: Twentieth Century Fox
- Distributed by: Twentieth Century Fox
- Release date: October 10, 1941
- Running time: 54 minuntes
- Country: United States
- Language: English

Riders of the Purple Sage is a 1941 American Western film based on the 1912 novel by Zane Grey, directed by James Tinling, and starring George Montgomery as Lassiter and Mary Howard as Jane Withersteen. The picture is the fourth of five screen adaptations of Grey's novel produced across an eight-decade span.

== Synopsis ==
Jim Lassiter learns early on that his niece Fay Larkin has been cheated out of her inheritance by crooked Judge Dyer.

== Cast ==
- George Montgomery as Jim Lassiter
- Mary Howard as Jane Withersteen
- Robert Barrat as Judge Dyer
- Lynne Roberts as Bess
- Kane Richmond as Adam Dyer
- Patsy Patterson as Fay Larkin
- Richard Lane as Oldring
- Oscar O'Shea as Noah Judkins
- James Gillette as Venters
- Frank McGrath as Pete
- LeRoy Mason as Jerry Card

== Other films based on novel ==
- Riders of the Purple Sage (1918 film) starring William Farnum
- Riders of the Purple Sage (1925 film) starring Tom Mix
- Riders of the Purple Sage (1931 film) starring George O'Brien
- Riders of the Purple Sage (1996 film) starring Ed Harris
