= Robert Bean =

Robert Bean may refer to:

- Robert S. Bean (1854–1931), American judge, Chief Justice of the Oregon Supreme Court
- Robert Bean (politician) (1935–1987), British Labour Party politician and polytechnic lecturer
- Robert Bean (gridiron football) (born 1978), American player of Canadian football
- Robert Bean (artist), Canadian artist, writer and teacher
- Robert Bennett Bean (1874–1944), American professor of anatomy and ethnologist
