= The Wild Man of Borneo (film) =

1941 film directed by Robert B. Sinclair

- Theatrical release poster
- Directed by: Robert B. Sinclair
- Screenplay by: Waldo Salt; John McClain
- Based on: The Wild Man of Borneo (1927 play) by Marc Connelly; Herman J. Mankiewicz
- Produced by: Joseph L. Mankiewicz
- Starring: Frank Morgan; Mary Howard; Billie Burke
- Cinematography: Oliver T. Marsh
- Edited by: Frank Sullivan
- Music by: David Snell
- Production company: Metro-Goldwyn-Mayer
- Distributed by: Loew's Inc.
- Release date: January 24, 1941
- Running time: 79 minutes
- Country: United States
- Language: English

The Wild Man of Borneo is a 1941 American period comedy film directed by Robert B. Sinclair and written by Waldo Salt and John McClain, based on the 1927 Broadway play by Marc Connelly and Herman J. Mankiewicz. The film stars Frank Morgan and features Mary Howard, Billie Burke, Donald Meek, Marjorie Main, Connie Gilchrist, Bonita Granville and Dan Dailey. The film was released on January 24, 1941 by Metro-Goldwyn-Mayer.

== Cast ==
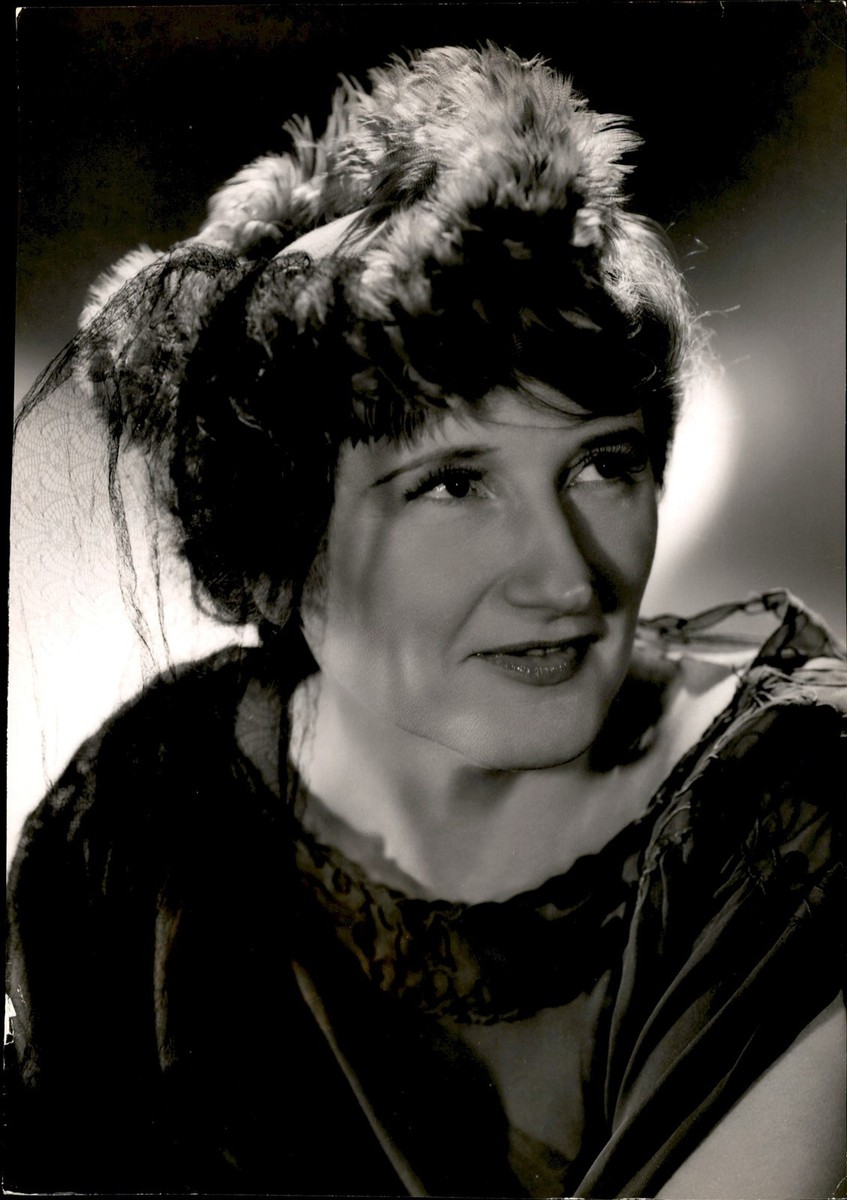
Promotional photo of Marjorie Main, 1941

- Frank Morgan as J. Daniel "Dan" Thompson
- Mary Howard as Mary Thompson
- Billie Burke as Bernice Marshall
- Donald Meek as Professor Charles W. Birdo
- Marjorie Main as Irma
- Connie Gilchrist as Mrs. Evelyn Diamond
- Bonita Granville as Francine "Frankie" Diamond
- Dan Dailey as Ed LeMotte
- Andrew Tombes as "Doc" Dunbar
- Walter Catlett as "Doc" Skelby
- Joseph J. Greene as Mr. Robert Emmett Ferderber
- Phil Silvers as Murdock
- Matt McHugh as Buggy driver
- James Flavin as Policeman

== Reception ==
Writing for Turner Classic Movies, Glenn Erickson observed: “The colorful cast includes a gallery of distinctive personalities: Donald Meek, Marjorie Main, Bonita Granville and Phil Silvers. Did producer Joseph Mankiewicz intend this odd comedy as an 'origin story' for the motion picture business?”

== Production ==
Principal photography took place from early October to mid-November 1940, with retakes starting on January 2, 1941, photographed by Robert Planck, since Oliver T. Marsh, the film's cinematographer, was shooting another film.

MGM employed Ruby Ray, a bird call imitator, to instruct Donald Meek on how to purse his lips so as to appear to be imitating birds. She also did the actual whistling heard in the film.

== Bibliography ==
- Fetrow, Alan G. Feature Films, 1940-1949: a United States Filmography. McFarland, 1994.
