= Riders of the Purple Sage =

1912 Western novel by Zane Grey

- Grosset & Dunlap first edition cover
- Author: Zane Grey
- Illustrator: Douglas Duer
- Cover artist: Wendell Galloway
- Language: English
- Genre: Western
- Publisher: Harper & Brothers, Grosset & Dunlap
- Publication date: 1912
- Publication place: United States
- Media type: Paper, 8vo
- Pages: 356
- Preceded by: The Heritage of the West
- Followed by: The Rainbow Trail

Riders of the Purple Sage is a Western novel by Zane Grey, first published by Harper & Brothers in 1912. Considered by scholars to have played a significant role in shaping the formula of the popular Western genre, the novel has been called "the most popular western novel of all time".

== Plot summary ==
Riders of the Purple Sage is a story about three main characters, Bern Venters, Jane Withersteen, and Jim Lassiter, who in various ways struggle with persecution from the local Mormon community led by Bishop Dyer and Elder Tull in the fictional town of Cottonwoods, Utah, around 1870-71.

Jane Withersteen, a born-and-raised Mormon, provokes Elder Tull because she is attractive, wealthy (and single), and befriends "Gentiles" (non-Mormons), namely, a little girl named Fay Larkin, a man she has hired named Bern Venters, and another hired man named Jim Lassiter. Elder Tull, a polygamist with two wives already, wishes to have Jane for a third wife, along with her estate.

The story involves cattle-rustling, horse-theft, kidnapping and gunfights.

During World War II the novel was rejected for publication as an Armed Services Editions paperback provided to US servicemen because of its perceived bias against Mormonism.

== Setting ==
The setting is Southern Utah canyon country, 1871. The influx of Mormon settlers from 1847 to 1857 serves as a backdrop for the plot. The Mormons had been living in Kirtland, Ohio, in the 1830s, but ventured west to escape local religious persecution.

== Point of view ==
The story is told by an omniscient narrator reporting the characters' actions and thoughts, for example: "On this night the same old loneliness beset Venters..."

== Characters ==
Jane Withersteen

Wealthy owner and operator of the sizable Withersteen ranch founded by her father. She is single, having resisted the efforts of others to push her into a plural marriage. Miss Withersteen sympathizes with both Mormons (her own people) and Gentiles, which gets her into trouble with the local bishop and elder.

Bern Venters

Venters is a non-Mormon employed by Miss Withersteen. As the story opens he is in a very poor state, being persecuted by the local Mormons. He is very able with firearms and horses, and is determined to survive and prosper.

Jim Lassiter

Lassiter is a gunfighter on a mysterious mission which brings him to Cottonwoods and Miss Withersteen. He is a non-Mormon and has no creed except his own pride.

Bess/Elizabeth Erne

Bess, known as the Masked Rider, has been raised by the outlaw Oldring and his band of rustlers; she has very little memory of her mother.

Elder Tull

Tull practices "plural marriage" and desires to marry Jane Withersteen. He also tries to drive Bern Venters and Lassiter out of town and out of the region.

== Sequel ==
The Rainbow Trail, a sequel to Riders of the Purple Sage that reveals the fate of Jane and Lassiter and their adopted daughter, was published in 1915. Both novels are notable for their protagonists' strong opposition to Mormon polygamy, but in Rainbow Trail this theme is treated more explicitly. Both plots revolve around the victimization of women in the Mormon culture: Riders of the Purple Sage centers on the struggle of a Mormon woman who sacrifices her wealth and social status to avoid becoming a junior wife of the head of the local church, while Rainbow Trail contrasts the fanatical older Mormons with the rising generation of Mormon women who will not tolerate polygamy and Mormon men who do not seek it.

== Adaptations ==
=== Films ===
Riders of the Purple Sage has been adapted to film five times.

- Riders of the Purple Sage (1918), starring William Farnum and Mary Mersch (silent)
- Riders of the Purple Sage (1925), starring Tom Mix and Mabel Ballin (silent)
- Riders of the Purple Sage (1931), starring George O'Brien and Marguerite Churchill (sound)
- Riders of the Purple Sage (1941), starring George Montgomery and Mary Howard
- Riders of the Purple Sage (1996), starring Ed Harris and Amy Madigan (television film)

=== Other media ===
In 1952, Dell released a comic book version of the novel (Dell # 372).

Riders of the Purple Sage was adapted into an opera by composer Craig Bohmler and librettist Steven Mark Kohn. It had its world premiere in February and March 2017 by the Arizona Opera in Tucson and Phoenix. The opera was broadcast nationwide on November 25, 2017, on the WFMT Radio Network's American Opera Series, and broadcast internationally in 2018 via distribution to the European Broadcasting Union.
