= Thru Different Eyes =

1942 film by Thomas Z. Loring

- Theatrical release poster
- Directed by: Thomas Z. Loring
- Screenplay by: Samuel G. Engel
- Produced by: Sol M. Wurtzel
- Starring: Frank Craven; Mary Howard; June Walker; Donald Woods; Vivian Blaine; George Holmes
- Cinematography: Charles G. Clarke
- Edited by: Louis R. Loeffler
- Music by: Cyril J. Mockridge; David Raksin
- Production company: 20th Century Fox
- Distributed by: 20th Century Fox
- Release date: June 19, 1942
- Running time: 64 minutes
- Country: United States
- Language: English

Thru Different Eyes is a 1942 American drama film directed by Thomas Z. Loring and written by Samuel G. Engel. The film stars Frank Craven, Mary Howard, June Walker, Donald Woods, Vivian Blaine and George Holmes. The film was released on June 19, 1942, by 20th Century Fox.

This film should not be confused with the 1929 Fox film Thru Different Eyes, which is sometimes known by alternative titles.

== Plot ==
District Attorney Steve Pettijohn relates the details of the murder of Jim Gardner, a banker, to a class of student attorneys.

Gardner had refused to give his wife, Constance, a divorce. She and her boyfriend, Ted Farnsworth, tried once more to change his mind when he drew a gun on them. Farnsworth leaves. Constance stays for a short time; later, Gardner is found dead. Both Constance and Farnsworth confess to protect each other.

Pettijohn's niece, Sue, is worried about her missing boyfriend, Harry, who was last seen near the murder site. Harry is found and tells of his fight with an angry Gardner, but he insists he did not fire the fatal shot. Harry's story is not believed; he is tried and convicted.

With time running out, Margie Pettijohn and Sue Boardman suspect everyone and search for and find new clues thus saving Harry and unmasking the real killer.

== Cast ==
- Frank Craven as Steve Pettijohn
- Mary Howard as Constance Gardner
- June Walker as Margie Pettijohn
- Donald Woods as Ted Farnsworth
- Vivian Blaine as Sue Boardman
- George Holmes as Harry Beach
- Jerome Cowan as Jim Gardner
- Charles Lane as Mott
- James Flavin as Thomas
- Ruth Warren as Julia
- Pat O'Malley as Coroner
- Irving Bacon as Stu Johnson
- Charles Waldron as Doctor Whittier
- Selmer Jackson as Chaplain
- Natalie Moorhead as Frances Thornton
