= Look, Ma, I'm Dancin'! =

Musical comedy in two acts

Look, Ma, I’m Dancin’!
- Sheet music
- Music: Hugh Martin
- Lyrics: Hugh Martin
- Book: Jerome Lawrence and Robert E. Lee

Look, Ma, I'm Dancin’! is a musical comedy in two acts with a book by Jerome Lawrence and Robert E. Lee, and music and lyrics by Hugh Martin. It was produced on Broadway in 1948.

== Production ==
After a try-out at the Shubert Theatre in Boston starting Thursday, December 25, 1947 and at the Forrest Theatre in Philadelphia, starting Tuesday, January 13, 1948, Look, Ma, I’m Dancin’! premiered on Broadway at the Adelphi Theatre on January 29, 1948, and closed on July 10, 1948, after 188 performances. It was produced by George Abbott. The production was conceived by Jerome Robbins and staged and choreographed by Abbott and Robbins. The scenery was designed by Oliver Smith and the costumes by John Pratt. The ballet arrangements were by Trude Rittman and the musical director was Pembroke Davenport.

The show starred Nancy Walker as Lily Malloy and Harold Lang as Eddie Winkler, and the cast included Alice Pearce as Dusty Lee.

== Synopsis ==
"Lily Malloy, a brewery heiress, becomes the angel of a travelling ballet company and finally takes it over from its conservative Russian impresario. Both the company and the repertoire liven up."

== Songs ==
Act 1

- “Gotta Dance”
- “I’m the First Girl”
- “I’m Not So Bright”
- “I’m Tired of Texas”
- “Tiny Room”
- “The Little Boy Blues”

Act 2

- “Jazz”
- “The New Look”
- “If You’ll Be Mine”
- “Pajama Dance”
- “Shauny O’Shay”
- “The Two of Us”

== Reception ==
Brooks Atkinson of The New York Times called it "a good knockabout musical comedy" and "a top-drawer Broadway show." He said, "Miss Walker is hilarious and the best slap-stock comedian of her generation."

== Sources ==
- Bordman, Gerald, American Musical Theatre, Oxford University Press, New York, 1978, pp. 560–561.
- Mantle, Burns (ed.) The Best Plays of 1947–1948, Dodd, Mead and Company, New York, 1948, pp. 379–380.
- Dietz, Dan, The Complete Book of 1940s Broadway Musicals, Rowman & Littlefield, New York, 2015, pp. 418–421.
- Stubblebine, Daniel J., Broadway Sheet Music, McFarland & Company, Jefferson, NC 1996, #1352, p. 167.
