= King Vitaman =

Breakfast cereal brand

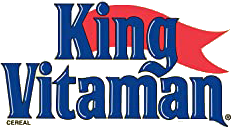
- Product type: Breakfast cereal
- Current owner: Quaker Oats
- Country: U.S.
- Introduced: 1968
- Discontinued: 2019

King Vitaman was an American brand of breakfast cereal produced by Quaker Oats and sold in the United States. The cereal was introduced in 1968, and changed mascots several times. The cereal was discontinued in 2019.

King Vitaman Cereal boasted high vitamin and iron content, in addition to a more modest amount of sugar (6 grams per serving) than many more popular breakfast cereals, such as Cap'n Crunch and Lucky Charms (which contain 13 grams or more). The early television commercials for the cereal were animated by Jay Ward Productions, the creators of Rocky and Bullwinkle. The advertising featured King Vitaman (voiced by character actor Joe Flynn) and his knights, Sir Laffitup (voiced by Paul Frees) and Sir Cravenleigh (voiced by Bill Scott), and their foes the Blue Baron (voiced by Daws Butler) and the Not-So-Bright Knight. The earlier commercials had King Vitaman tell his dimwitted knight to pour the milk over King Vitaman cereal, but instead the milk is poured over the king, prompting the king to say, angrily: "Not me, you dingaling, the cereal!" Subsequent non-animated advertisements ended with a jingle inviting children to "Have Breakfast with the King."

From 1971 until his death in 1977, actor George Mann, an ex-vaudevillian in the comedic dance act Barto and Mann, depicted King Vitaman on the cereal box and in television commercials. In 2000, Quaker Oats returned to an illustrated character on their King Vitaman cereal boxes.

== See also ==
- Quaker Oats
- List of breakfast cereal advertising characters
