= Olsen and Johnson =

American comedy team

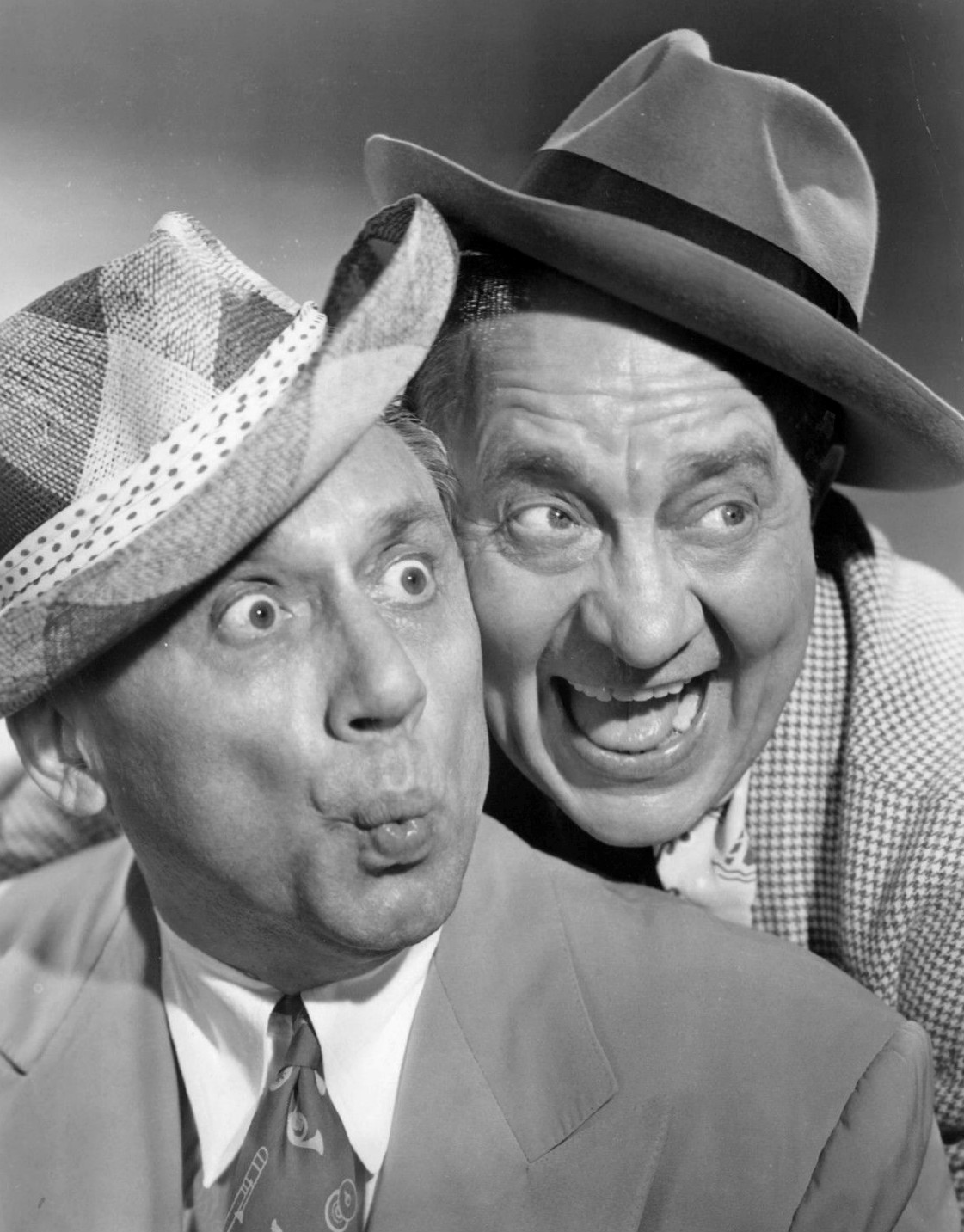
- Ole Olsen (left), Chic Johnson (right)

Comedy career
- Medium: Stand-up, television, film, vaudeville, radio
- Genres: Slapstick, musical comedy

John Sigvard "Ole" Olsen (November 6, 1892 – January 26, 1963) and Harold Ogden "Chic" Johnson (March 5, 1891 – February 26, 1962) were American comedians of vaudeville, radio, the Broadway stage, motion pictures and television. Their shows were noted for their blackout gags and orchestrated mayhem ("anything can happen, and it probably will"). Their most famous production was the stage musical (and later movie) Hellzapoppin.

Comedy teams traditionally had a straight man and a stooge. However, Olsen and Johnson both took on the comic role, goodnaturedly chuckling their way through the steady barrage of gunshots, explosions, props plummeting to earth, intrusions from other performers, and input from the audience.

== Early career ==
Ole Olsen and Chic Johnson began as musical entertainers: Ole (pronounced "OH-lee") played the violin and Chic (pronounced "chick") played ragtime piano. They met in 1914 when Olsen hired Johnson to replace the pianist in his College Four quartet. Ole and Chic hit it off immediately and joined forces for a vaudeville act. No joke was too old, no song too corny for Ole and Chic, and the two engaging comics became a minor sensation in the Midwest. Radio enlarged their audience and led to appearances in early talkie movies for Warner Bros. and two more minor features for Republic Pictures. The movies of the 1930s, though, were much too confining for Olsen and Johnson's special brand of nut humor. Ole and Chic recited their lines and played off each other well, but their scripts were too formal, leaving the team little room for their nonsensical comedy. During the summer of 1932, they were featured each week on NBC's (radio) Red Network's Fleischmann's Yeast Hour. Based on surviving samples, Rudy Vallee did not interact with them on-air. The intense and fast-paced segments were titled "The Padded Cell of the Air". As 1932 was a presidential election year, they nominated Mickey Mouse for president. The "Padded Cell" segments are clearly a predecessor of Hellzapoppin, the revue they mounted in 1938.

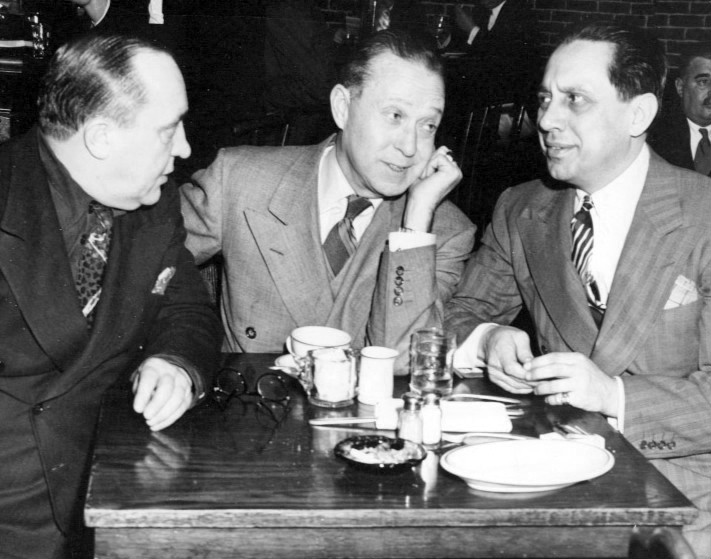
Left to right: Chic Johnson, Harry Langdon, Ole Olsen.

== Hellzapoppin ==
Although Olsen and Johnson were a leading act in vaudeville, their greatest achievement was their "legitimate theater" production of Hellzapoppin. Assembled and produced by Olsen and Johnson, Hellzapoppin opened at New York's 46th Street Theatre on September 22, 1938, and ran for 1,404 performances, transferring to the Winter Garden Theatre mid-run.

The show had its start in a revue called Monkey Business wherein the team began developing their signature style of observing and commenting on the lunacy taking place around them. The gags and comic premises were borrowed from classic variety entertainment, but Olsen and Johnson put an original spin on the material through their inspired improvisation in live performance.

Described as a rule-breaking exercise in hysteria, Hellzapoppin was a comic amalgam of the best—or worst—of vaudeville and burlesque. It gloried in the broadest type of comedy, with no sketch too lowbrow to be included. Technically a musical because it included a score by lyricist Charles Tobias and composer Sammy Fain, it was best known for its crazy combination of comedy acts, which included clowns, midgets, and animals. Stylistically, the show consistently broke the fourth wall, using cast members planted in the audience or in the aisles, and zany audience-participation gags. It also made heavy use of prop comedy, including rubber snakes, breakaway pants and skirts, clotheslines filled with laundry, and even electric buzzers hidden inside some of the theater seats.

Sophisticated Broadway audiences were unprepared for such chaos: stray props came out of nowhere, comic characters in the audience disrupted the action, Olsen and Johnson dashed on and off the stage in crazy costumes and indulged in cheerfully earthy humor, chorus girls lost their skirts, and vaudeville acts did their trick specialties. The show never played the same way twice. On some nights songs would be preempted by jokes, and on others jokes would be interrupted by songs.

== Olsen and Johnson at Universal Pictures ==
In 1941, Universal Pictures decided to commit Hellzapoppin' to film (unlike the musical, including an apostrophe in the title), with plenty of crazy and sometimes innovative gags. A cab driver literally goes to hell, with Olsen and Johnson as his reluctant passengers. A serious song by Robert Paige and Jane Frazee is interrupted when a title card crashes on the screen, advising one Stinky Miller to go home. Man-chasing Martha Raye pursues Mischa Auer, who finds himself suddenly stripped down to his underwear and running a mock track meet. The film goes out of frame, and Olsen and Johnson try to correct the problem themselves. The action is interrupted by scenes from someone else's movie, and Olsen and Johnson complain to the projectionist. Despite Universal's insistence on a then-customary romance and a "serious plot," somewhat diluting the Olsen and Johnson onslaught, Hellzapoppin' is still fresh and funny. Copyright issues involving the original stage production have forced the film version out of general circulation in the United States, although a European DVD has been released.

The film version treated the show as a work in progress: Olsen and Johnson step out of the picture, stop the action to interact with the audience, and sabotage their own show-within-the-movie by using optical movie effects. This creative use of the film medium got Hellzapoppin' listed by theyshootpictures.com as one of the 1,000 most innovative films ever made.

Pleased with the film's boxoffice performance, Universal signed the team for three more features. Crazy House (1943) had Olsen and Johnson running amok through the Universal studio and evacuating the staff, including Universal regulars Basil Rathbone and Nigel Bruce, Johnny Mack Brown, Leo Carrillo, and Andy Devine. When Olsen and Johnson present themselves at the head office with the announcement "Universal's most sensational comedy team outside!", the studio chief replies, "Oh, Abbott and Costello! Send them right in!" The chief refuses to deal with Olsen and Johnson again, so Ole and Chic decide to make their own movie. The cast of Crazy House includes many of Universal's stars and featured players: Allan Jones, Shemp Howard, Robert Paige, Franklin Pangborn, and Martha O'Driscoll, among others.

Both Hellzapoppin' and Crazy House had been very expensive productions, on a par with Universal's popular Abbott and Costello comedies. For the remaining two films on Olsen and Johnson's contract, the studio decided to economize, using its salaried contract players and less elaborate staging and settings. In Ghost Catchers (1944), Ole and Chic help singer Gloria Jean make her Carnegie Hall debut despite strange happenings in a spooky old house. See My Lawyer (1945) was a patchwork of vaudeville acts, with Olsen and Johnson noticeably absent from most of the proceedings.

== Other Broadway productions ==
Olsen and Johnson kept working on the Broadway stage during the 1940s, making occasional trips to Hollywood to fulfill their movie commitments.

Olsen and Johnson's shows were so popular that the team franchised them, with road companies headlining similar vaudeville acts and comedians. The 1942 road company of Hellzapoppin starred Jay C. Flippen and Happy Felton in the Olsen and Johnson roles. The 1949 Australian revival of Hellzapoppin starred Don de Leo and George Mayo (as "Olsen and Johnson").

In December 1941, Olsen and Johnson returned to Broadway with a new revue, Sons O' Fun, which offered the same frenzied assortment of old gags and new songs. After this show had run its course, Olsen and Johnson mounted yet another variation on Hellzapoppin, this one titled Laffing Room Only (1944). Their final Broadway show was the 1950 production Pardon Our French, introducing their "discovery," French singer Denise Darcel. Unlike the previous Olsen and Johnson hits, Pardon Our French ran only three months, closing on January 6, 1951. However, Olsen and Johnson continued to perform in tours and revivals, including a 1959 production at Flushing Meadows in Queens, NY, called "Hellz-a-Splashin': An Aqua-cade."

== Television ==
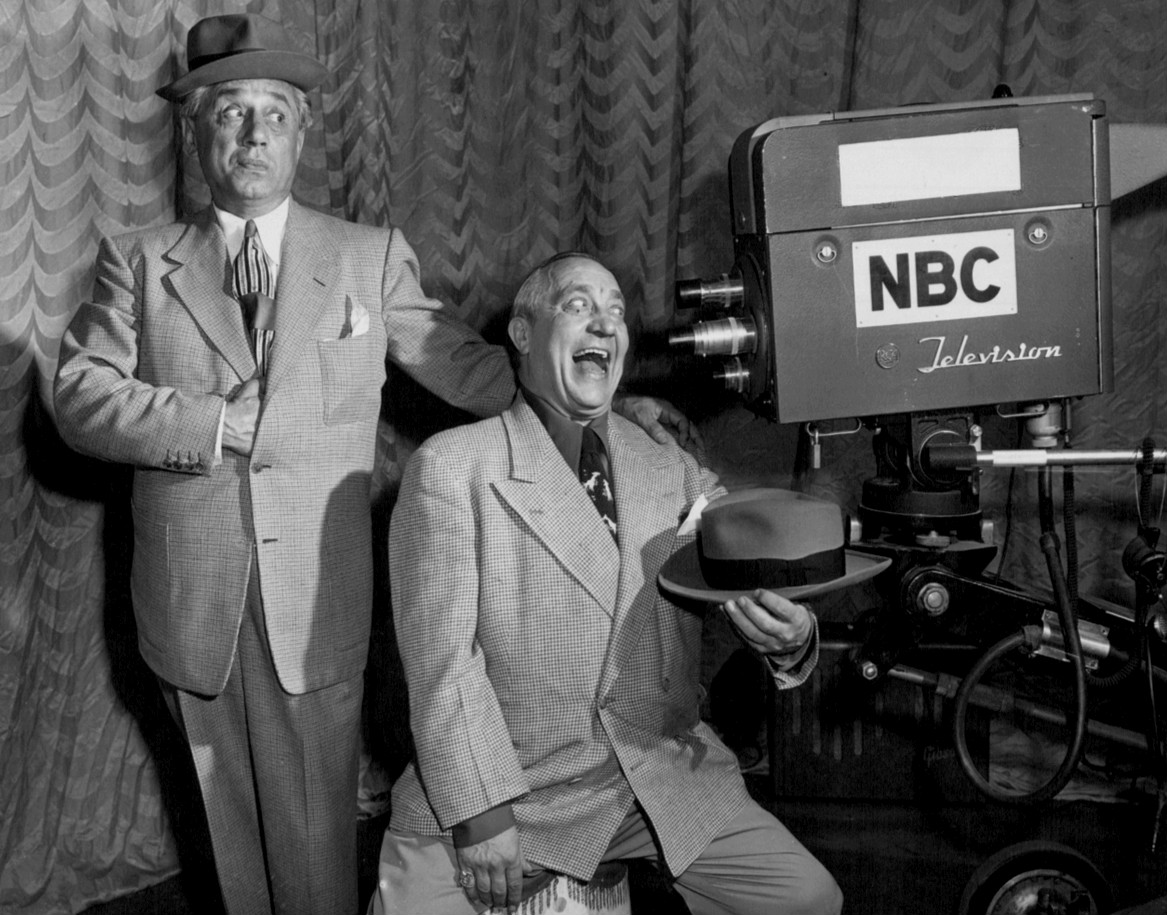
On the set of Fireball Fun for All

In 1949 NBC Television hired Olsen and Johnson to star in a variety show, Fireball Fun for All, sponsored by Buick and its Fireball 8 engine. It was hard to adapt Olsen and Johnson's prop-laden humor to a rigid time slot. Surviving kinescopes of the expensive, short-lived show demonstrate just how hard everyone tried to recapture the old, large-scale Hellzapoppin magic under the limitations of live television. At least the series reflected on the stars' achievement: they had now performed in every form of popular entertainment. The team tried TV again, appearing semi-regularly on NBC's All-Star Revue. Their last regular TV series was ABC's 1957 children's series Popsicle Five Star Comedy. Seen Saturday evenings, the brief series also featured ventriloquists Paul Winchell and Senor Wences and cartoonist-storyteller Bob Bean.

Olsen and Johnson continued to preside over rowdy revues into the 1950s, mostly in Las Vegas.

On June 21, 1953, they appeared together as the "mystery guests" on What's My Line?. Every time the blindfolded panelists guessed the wrong comedy team, Johnson glared at them with mock anger and silent epithets.

== Library of gags ==
Olsen and Johnson used hundreds of gag props and mechanical devices over the course of their partnership. As vaudevillians they safeguarded some of these specialties by submitting detailed descriptions and diagrams to National Vaudeville Artists, Inc.'s Protected Material Department, "extensively used for years by the creators of gags, routines, skits, stunts, and unique specialties." Fellow vaudeville comedian Fred Allen described the procedure in his memoir:

"Any member could protect his act. All he had to do was to enclose a copy of his material in a sealed envelope and deliver it to the N.V.A. office. The envelope was placed in the Protected Material files. Later, if a plagiarist was brought to bay, the act preferred charges, the sealed envelope was opened, and the N.V.A. officials dispensed justice. Hundreds of acts protected their material through this service. After Albee's death, vaudeville started over the hill and took the N.V.A. club with it."

The N.V.A. office finally discontinued the Protected Material Department on September 15, 1947, "owing to lack of space." The originators of the material were invited to claim it in person; after 30 days the N.V.A. would dispose of the files left unclaimed. Ole Olsen remembered the storehouse of gags contained in the files, and purchased all of the remaining material that had been abandoned.

Olsen had long been a collector of theatrical memorabilia. In June 1947 he paid $5,000 ($71,703 in 2025) for the entire published and unpublished material—40 years' worth—of author James Madison. Madison's Budget was a regularly published compendium of jokes, sketches, and song lyrics sold to vaudevillians at one dollar per issue. Olsen also bought the effects of stage producer Ned Wayburn, including many Will Rogers monologues.

By the 1950s Olsen had compiled a comprehensive library of venerable gag material, storing it on his property in Malvern, Long Island. He valued the library at $250,000 ($2,845,186 in 2025) and made it available to professional writers in 1957. This was front-page news for Variety, which described the "humor library" as containing "over 3,000 volumes, including the original Joe Miller books and a complete collection of Punch. All gags are cross-filed. Olsen will let would-be humorists look at it by the hour at the following rates: $100 per hour for all you can tape record; $50 per hour for all you can write down; and $25 an hour for all you can remember."

== Philanthropy ==
Olsen and Johnson raised money for any number of charities. Entertainment historian Joe Laurie, Jr. paid tribute to the team in 1947: "Olsen and Johnson have played hundreds of benefits for all sorts of causes. They never say no to a plea for help. They'll empty their last [gun] cartridge for a pal. They are always ready to fire a fusillade of fun for any charity. They have the ability to win the hearts and confidence of all with whom they associate. I like Olsen and Johnson because they are loyal to each other, to their families and friends. They are nutty but nice!"

== Final years ==
In the late 1950s illness forced Chic Johnson to retire from the hectic show-business lifestyle, while Ole Olsen continued to work as a solo performer. When Milton Berle was hosting NBC's Jackpot Bowling in 1960, Olsen was on hand to play straight to Berle's antics. This was actually a surprise for Olsen, as his live comic routine was interrupted by Ralph Edwards and a This Is Your Life tribute. The flabbergasted Olsen greeted family and friends, with frequent breaks for time-honored O & J sight gags. The final guest was Chic Johnson, who ran on-camera in his familiar stage costume and joyfully reunited with his old friend and partner.

Johnson died in 1962; Olsen, less than a year later. The two partners had always been close and their final resting places (in Las Vegas) are adjacent.

== Revivals ==
Theatrical producer Alexander H. Cohen had long remembered Hellzapoppin: "I was an 18-year-old stagestruck college student when Hellzapoppin opened, and I studied it like a textbook. I saw it 19 times during its run on Broadway." It was Cohen's fond hope to produce Hellzapoppin himself, and he purchased the rights "from the estate of Olsen and Johnson" in 1966. Within the year Cohen mounted a revival at Expo 67, the World's Fair at Montreal, featuring comics Soupy Sales and Will B. Able (Willard S. Achorn); the show was a special attraction and ran only for the length of the exposition. Cohen's plans for a Broadway opening were tabled in favor of a network-television special. A one-hour Hellzapoppin starring Jack Cassidy, Ronnie Schell, and Lynn Redgrave was aired by ABC-TV in 1972.

Cohen had been impressed by Lynn Redgrave in the TV special, and signed her to appear opposite Jerry Lewis in a Broadway revival. The premiere performance was scheduled for Sunday night, February 13, 1977, and the NBC network paid one million dollars to televise, for the first time in history, a Broadway opening night. There was turmoil behind the scenes, however, during the show's out-of-town tryouts. Comedy star Lewis dominated the production and had serious arguments with producer Cohen, co-star Redgrave, and writer-adaptor Abe Burrows. Cohen abruptly closed the show before it reached New York, and canceled both the Broadway engagement and the opening-night TV spectacular, forfeiting NBC's million-dollar payment.

== Legacy ==
Olsen and Johnson's comedy style has often been imitated (most successfully by Rowan and Martin's Laugh-In).

== Films ==
- Oh Sailor Behave! (Warner Bros., 1930) (68 minutes)
- Fifty Million Frenchmen (Warner Bros., 1931) (68 minutes)
- Gold Dust Gertie (Warner Bros., 1931) (66 minutes)
- Hollywood on Parade #A-2 (Paramount, 1932) (short subject, 10 minutes)
- Country Gentlemen (Republic, 1936) (66 minutes)
- Cinema Circus (Metro-Goldwyn-Mayer, 1936) (Technicolor short subject, 20 minutes)
- All Over Town (Republic, 1937) (58 minutes)
- Boy Friend (20th Century Fox, 1939 (70 minutes) (Ole Olsen appeared uncredited as a taxi driver)
- Hellzapoppin' (Universal, 1941) (84 minutes) (with Shemp Howard)
- Crazy House (Universal, 1943) (80 minutes) (with Percy Kilbride)
- Screen Snapshots (Columbia, 1944) (short subject, 10 minutes, with Gloria Jean and Leo Carrillo)
- Ghost Catchers (Universal, 1944) (67 minutes) (with Gloria Jean)
- See My Lawyer (Universal, 1945) (67 minutes) (with Stanley Clements)
- Johnny at the Fair (Sterling, 1947) (short subject, 12 minutes)
- It's a Tough Life (Universal, 1957) (short subject, 10 minutes)

== Sources ==
- Frank Cullen, Vaudeville Old & New: An Encyclopedia of Variety Performers in America, Vol. 2, Taylor & Francis Group Publishing, 2007.
- Leonard Maltin, Movie Comedy Teams, Signet, 1970, revised 1985. (Chapter about Olsen and Johnson)
