= Ghost Catchers =

1944 film by Edward F. Cline

- Directed by: Edward F. Cline
- Written by: Edmund L. Hartmann, Elwood Ullman (uncredited)
- Based on: An unpublished story by Milt Gross and Edward F. Cline
- Produced by: Milton Feld
- Starring: Ole Olsen, Chic Johnson, Gloria Jean
- Cinematography: Charles Van Enger
- Edited by: Arthur Hilton
- Music by: Edward Ward
- Distributed by: Universal Pictures
- Release date: May 30, 1944; (New York)
- Running time: 68 minutes
- Country: United States
- Language: English

Ghost Catchers is a 1944 American comedy horror film. It was the third of four comedy features produced by Universal Pictures for Broadway's comedy stars Olsen and Johnson.

== Plot ==
The Marshall family of Georgia has rented an old house in New York, where youngest daughter Melinda is due to make her singing debut at Carnegie Hall. When the family is unsettled by strange noises and visions, eldest daughter Susanna runs next door for help. Unfortunately for her, next door is a nightclub, where Ole Olsen and Chic Johnson perform their zany routines with gun shots, airborne props, and trap doors. Ole and Chic agree to investigate, and discover a corpse. The murdered man was the house's caretaker. The house is indeed haunted -- by Wilbur Duffington, bon vivant of the Gay Nineties. Ole and Chic learn that a criminal gang is trying to scare the family out of the house, but the gang captures both the comedians and the Marshalls. Wilbur the ghost intercedes at a crucial moment, and Ole and Chic set a trap for the masked ringleader.

== Cast ==
- Ole Olsen as Himself
- Chic Johnson as Himself
- Gloria Jean as Melinda Marshall
- Martha O'Driscoll as Susanna Marshall
- Walter Catlett as Col. Marshall
- Leo Carrillo as Jerry
- Andy Devine as Horsehead
- Lon Chaney Jr. as Bear
- Jack Norton as Wilbur Duffington

== Production ==
The role of the elder daughter was originally assigned to Diana Barrymore, then under contract to Universal. Co-star Gloria Jean, who joined the cast in February 1944, recalled, "Diana Barrymore was supposed to do Ghost Catchers but she didn't like the idea of working with Olsen & Johnson. So they replaced her with Martha O'Driscoll."

Edmund L. Hartmann's script was titled High Spirits. It went into production as The Ghost Catchers.

Olsen and Johnson's previous films for Universal were among the studio's most expensive productions, and were sold as major motion pictures. Universal decided to economize for the two remaining Olsen & Johnson comedies, using salaried contract players, standing sets, and existing costumes. Ghost Catchers was drastically edited down to 68 minutes, where it could play as the stronger or lesser attraction in double features.

== Reception ==
The Hollywood preview was embarrassing. Universal's leading comedy team Abbott and Costello had been off the screen for a year and a half, owing to Costello's being ill with rheumatic fever. When Ghost Catchers was previewed, the theater was packed with people expecting the return of Abbott & Costello. When the main titles announced Olsen & Johnson, half the audience got up and left.

Olsen and Johnson's very broad, free-wheeling style of comedy had always been a matter of taste, and reviews ran the gamut according to each reviewer's report. Variety enjoyed the film: "In the best Olsen & Johnson tradition, Ghost Catchers is a tuneful, screwy concoction, brief and zippy. Grooved for the top rung on duals [meaning the main attraction on double-feature programs], it is money in the bank." On the other hand Motion Picture Reviews, which specialized in evaluating the suitability of films for young people, wrote: "It is necessary to be a whole-hearted Olsen and Johnson fan to enjoy Ghost Catchers, because its noisy, wacky slapstick is more pointless than ever, [but] there are good specialty acts to relieve the tedium. The macabre action will terrify children."

Ghost Catchers was re-released by Realart Pictures in 1949.

== See also ==
- List of American films of 1944
- Ghostbusters
