= James Madison (writer) =

American theatre manager and writer

Charles Aronstein (August 27, 1870 – March 27, 1943), who wrote under the pen name James Madison, was an American theatre manager, writer and publisher, responsible for writing and publishing the periodical Madison's Budget.

He was born in San Francisco, California, the son of Dr. Adolf Aronstein (1834 – 1901}, born in Germany. For many years Charles Aronstein managed theatres and touring companies in California and elsewhere, including the Princess Theater in New York. He also collaborated on scripts for silent movies including The Cohens and Kellys, and wrote sketches for the Bella Union Theater in San Francisco.

From 1898, he published Madison's Budget, for sale at $1 per copy, which provided "a cyclopedia of comedy material", including jokes, sketches, monologues and other material for free use by vaudeville performers, after dinner speakers and others. Its cover line was: "My business is to make the world laugh." It was published twice a year until at least 1928, with all material written by Madison. Much of the humor played on racial stereotypes. From about 1930, Madison sold compilations of his Budget to radio stars including Fred Allen and Eddie Cantor.

In later years he owned and published several other magazines, including The Collector's Guide and The Rare Book Speculator.

He was married to Edwina Leerburger (1872-1942). He died at Mount Sinai Hospital, New York, in 1943 at the age of 72, following an operation. His collection of published and unpublished comedy material was purchased by collector Ole Olsen, of the Olsen and Johnson comedy team, for $5,000.
