= The Blackburn Twins =

American duo of entertainers (active 1925–1954)

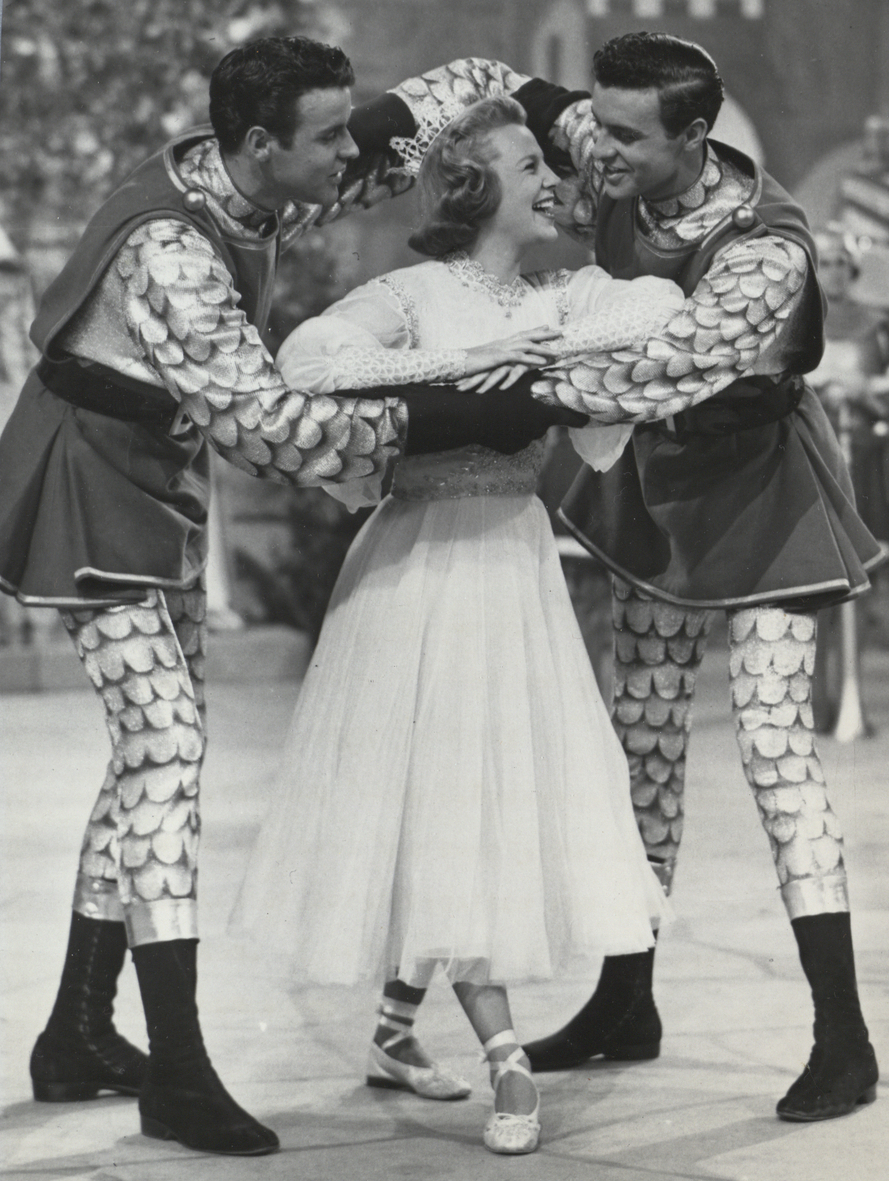
Ramon et Royce Blackburn

The Blackburn Twins were an American duo of entertainers (dancer-singer-actor) who appeared on stage, film, and television in the mid-20th century.

The twin brothers, Ramon Perez and Royce Perez, later professionally known as the Blackburn Twins, were born January 8, 1925 in Blue Point, New York.

At the age of seven they performed on stage in the Jerome Kern musical Music in the Air, which ran in 1932–33. Also in 1932 they made their film debut in Her First Affaire with Ida Lupino.

As child actors the boys appeared in the Broadway plays 200 Were Chosen (1936) and As You Like It (1937). Separately, Royce appeared in Everywhere I Roam (1938–39) and Ramon in Stop-Over (1938). As a duo the pair danced in Olsen and Johnson's Sons o' Fun (1941–43).

Drafted into the army during World War II, they appeared in both the stage and screen versions of the patriotic show Winged Victory (1943–44). In 1946 they appeared in a gimmicky musical short as part of a series called Film Vodvil-"Three Sets of Twins" with the McFarland Twins (musicians) and the Burke Twins (singers).

The Blackburn Twins are best remembered for three films: Words and Music (1948), Take Me Out to the Ball Game (1949), and She's Working Her Way Through College (1952).

The bulk of their professional work was in nightclubs, but from 1948 through 1954 they also made television appearances on shows like Cavalcade of Stars, The Ed Sullivan Show, Texaco Star Theater with Milton Berle, The Colgate Comedy Hour, The Tonight Show, and The Arthur Murray Party.

In 1952 while performing at the Copa Cabana, Ramon met and fell for Copa Girl Joyce Sieger. They were married within weeks.

Royce died of cancer on April 14, 1994, (age 69) in New Ipswich, New Hampshire. Ramon died August 17, 2018, (age 93) in Boynton Beach, Florida.
