= Dewey Barto =

American comedian and vaudevillian (1896–1973)

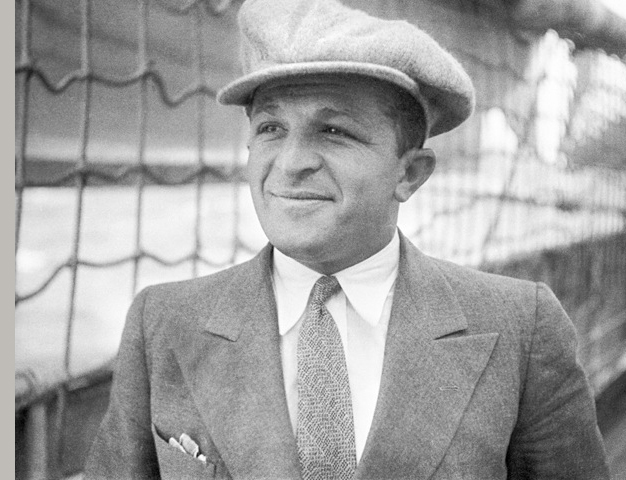
- Barto on board the Cunard ship RMS Mauretania on a cruise to Cuba and the Caribbean Sea; photograph taken by his partner George Mann in March, 1933
- Born: Steward Stephen Swoyer; June 10, 1896; Reading, Pennsylvania, U.S.
- Died: January 31, 1973 (aged 76); Beverly Hills, California, U.S.
- Other names: Stewart Steven Swoyer; Dewey Swoyer
- Occupations: Comedian, acrobat
- Spouse: Myrtle Flemming Lawler (m. 1919-1931)
- Children: 2, including Anna

Dewey Barto (June 10, 1896 – January 31, 1973) was best known as the shorter half of the comedic and acrobatic dance act, Barto and Mann. He was the father of actress Nancy Walker, known earlier in life as "Nan Barto".

== Early life ==
Dewey Barto was baptized on March 28, 1897, with the name Steward Stephen Swoyer, according to Pennsylvania's Church and Town Records, 1708-1985, in Reading, Pennsylvania, one of the eight children born to Elizabeth and Charles "Roxie" Swoyer, an acrobat, who owned a horse and wagon circus. Barto later adjusted his name to Stewart Steven Swoyer, as per his World War II draft records.

== Early career ==
Dewey came from a family of performers. His sisters Estelle and Ida were trapeze artists and contortionists, first as the Miaco Sisters and later as the Delno Sisters. His brother Charles played drums with several well-known bands. By the age of 16, Dewey was the youngest trader on the Curb Market on Wall Street. He gained popularity as a dancer in Liberty bond drives, and when his company collapsed during a financial depression, Dewey joined The Three Bartos acrobatic team. He initially used the name Dewey Swoyer, but later changed his name to Dewey Barto, a name he used for the rest of his life.

Circa 1922, just before the birth of his eldest daughter, Nancy Walker, Dewey Barto was performing in an acrobatic act billed as Barto and Melvin ("The Wielders"). The act ended after three years in early 1925. Dewey began dancing solo in 1924 as "The Hectic Hoofer" and continued performing as a single with Fanchon and Marco enterprises in 1925.

== Barto and Mann ==
While performing as a single with Fanchon and Marco in early 1926, Barto (1.50 m - 4'11", the same height as his elder daughter) was paired with George Mann (1.98 m - 6'6"). Together, they began to develop comedic dance and acrobatic material based on the disparity in their heights that was well received by audiences up and down the West Coast. At the end of 1926, they signed a ten-year contract with Fanchon and Marco that linked them together as Barto and Mann for over 15 years. William Morris of the William Morris Agency booked them "cold" into the Palace Theatre on March 14, 1927, where they were a great success. With offers from all the major vaudeville circuits, they chose to sign with the Orpheum Circuit. Several months later they had switched to the Keith-Albee Circuit with whom they toured across the U.S. until they signed with Earl Carroll's Vanities from August 1928 to February 1929.

Myrtle Lawler Barto died suddenly on January 2, 1931. Following a break to recover from his wife's death, Barto rejoined Mann and continued touring the U.S. and Canada, with European tours in the summers of 1931 and 1934. As vaudeville faded, Barto and Mann joined the Broadway cast of Olsen and Johnson's Hellzapoppin, with featured billing from 1938 until 1942. The team split up in December 1943. From late 1944 to early 1948, Dewey Barto appeared on stage with another partner as Barto & Stan.

== American Guild of Variety Artists ==
In the early 1920s, Barto joined the National Vaudeville Artists, E.F. Albee's company union formed to counter the White Rats. In early August 1940, Barto was named president of the American Guild of Variety Artists (AGVA), succeeding Jay Flippen who had resigned earlier. Barto resigned as president of the AGVA in February 1941, which led to the Associated Actors and Artistes of America (4As) assuming operational control of AGVA.

Barto was again elected to the board of the AGVA to represent the New York local in May 1941. When AGVA achieved independence from the Associated Actors and Artistes of America in November 1948, Barto was unanimously drafted by AGVA's national board to become its National Administrative Secretary. He announced his intention to resign the position in November 1949.

== Personal life ==
On July 4, 1919, in Manhattan, Barto married Philadelphia-born vaudeville performer and dancer Myrtle Flemming Lawler (born 1898 – died 1931), half of the Grazer and Lawler song and dance act.

Their elder daughter, Anna Myrtle Swoyer, was born in Philadelphia on May 10, 1922. She later changed her name to Nancy Walker, becoming an actress and comedian of stage, screen, and television. She died in 1992, aged 69. Her younger sister, Betty Lou Swoyer, was born on August 17, 1930, almost five months before the sudden death of their mother. Betty Lou had a relatively brief performing career before disappearing from public view.

Barto died in Beverly Hills, California on January 31, 1973, aged 76.

== See also ==
- Barto and Mann
- Nancy Walker
- George Mann
- Hellzapoppin
