= Hellzapoppin (musical) =

1938 musical revue written by the comedy team of Olsen and Johnson

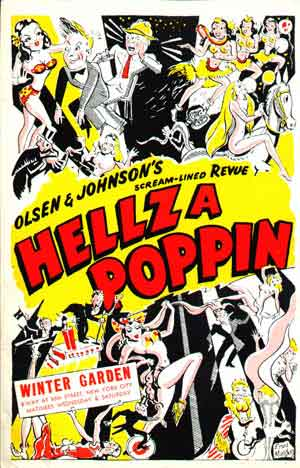
- Original Broadway window card
- Music: Sammy Fain; Charles Tobias
- Lyrics: Sammy Fain; Charles Tobias
- Book: Harold "Chic" Johnson; John "Ole" Olsen
- Productions: 1938 Broadway; 1941 Film

Hellzapoppin is a musical revue written by the comedy team of Olsen and Johnson, consisting of John "Ole" Olsen and Harold "Chic" Johnson, with music and lyrics by Sammy Fain and Charles Tobias. The revue was a hit, running for over three years, and was at the time the longest-running Broadway musical, with 1,404 performances, making it one of only three plays to run more than 500 performances in the 1930s.

== Production ==
In 1938, after opening at the Shubert Theatre in Boston on September 10, Hellzapoppin opened on Broadway at the original 46th Street Theatre on September 22. It was then transferred to the Winter Garden Theatre on November 26, and finally moved to the Majestic Theatre on November 25, 1941. It closed on December 17, 1941, after a total of 1,404 performances.

Olsen & Johnson led a large cast of entertainers: the comedy team of Barto and Mann (Dewey Barto and George Mann); Charles Whithers; celebrity impersonators, the Radio Rogues; Hal Sherman; Walter Nilsson; singing group The Charioteers; identical-twin dancers Betty Mae and Beverly Crane; stage magician Theo Hardeen (better known as Harry Houdini's younger brother); the Hawaiian music of Ray Kinney and the Aloha Maids; Bergh and Moore; J. C. Olsen; Reed, Dean and Reed (Bonnie Reed, Syd Dean, and Mel Reed); Roberta and Ray; The Starlings; Dorothy Thomas; Shirley Wayne; Cyrel Roodney and June Winters; Billy Adams; and Whitey's Steppers (also known as Whitey's Lindy Hoppers). Olsen & Johnson were succeeded by Jay C. Flippen and Happy Felton in June 1940.

=== On the road ===
In late 1940 and during 1941, while Hellzapoppin was still playing at the Winter Garden Theatre and later the Majestic Theatre, a second edition of Hellzapoppin with Billy House and Eddie Garr (father of Teri Garr) toured the country. The cast included Grace & Nokko, The Oxford Boys, Sterner Sisters, Ben Dova, Paul Gordon, Billy Potter and Bobby Jarvis.

Following the close of Hellzapoppin at the Majestic Theatre on December 18, 1941, many in the Broadway cast went on the road during 1942 with Jay C. Flippen and Happy Felton. This road edition of Hellzapoppin included Barto and Mann, Charles Withers, the Radio Rogues, Harry Reso, Walter Nilsson, The Charioteers, Lyda Sue, Theo Hardeen, June Winters, Bonnie Reed, Shirley Wayne, Ruth Faber, Stephanie Olsen, Bergh and Moore, Dippy Diers, Bobby Barry, Billy Adams, and Sid Dean. The road shows continued in the same style of sight gags, risqué humor, and audience involvement.

In late 1942, a New 1943 Hellzapoppin revue with Jackie Gleason and Lew Parker was staged at the Nixon Theatre, Pittsburgh, Pennsylvania; the Hanna Theatre, Cleveland, Ohio; and the Erlanger Theatre, Chicago, Illinois. The cast included many of the original and road show performers (Barto and Mann, the Radio Rogues, Charles Withers, Theo Hardeen, Harry Reso, Stephen Olsen, Bergh and Moore, Dippy Diers and Billy Adams) and several newcomers to the show (the Biltmorettes, the Commandos, the Kim Loo Sisters, Mary McNamee, and Jean Baker).

In 1949, Olsen & Johnson went back on the road with Hellzapoppin of 1949. The all new cast featured family members J. C. Olsen (Ole's son), June Johnson (Chic's daughter), and Marty May (Chic's son-in-law), along with vaudevillians Harrison & Fisher; Shirley, Sharon & Wanda; Nirska; Jose Duval; Gloria LeRoy; Frank Cook; The 6 Mighty Atoms; Shannon Dean; Helen Magna; Andy Ratouscheff; Hank Whitehouse; John Howes; Billy Kay; Maurice Millard; and Frank Hardy.

== Sketches ==
A comedy hodgepodge full of sight gags and slapstick, the show was constantly improvised every night throughout its run to remain topical; it opened with newsreel clips of Adolf Hitler speaking in a Yiddish accent, Benito Mussolini speaking in blackface minstrel dialect, and Franklin D. Roosevelt speaking gibberish, before the real-life Olsen & Johnson burst through the image (actually, a transparent sheet in front of the screen). A circus atmosphere prevailed, with dwarfs, clowns, trained pigeons and audience participation adding to the merriment. Chorus girls left the stage to dance with audience members or sit in their laps. Laundry-filled clotheslines were strung across the theater over the audiences' heads, and some seats were wired with electric buzzers that were triggered during the performance.

The sketches were a "smorgasbord of explode-the-fourth-wall nuttiness:... comedy songs; skits abandoned partway through; cameos by audience stooges; an absurdist raffle; and in a trademark stunt, a man who wandered through the theater hawking an ever-larger potted tree". The comedy continued even after the show had ended, as departing audience members discovered the man who'd been carrying the increasingly tall plant waiting for them in the lobby, trapped and shouting atop a 20-foot tree.

Seeing a painting of a warship, Olsen & Johnson began firing weapons at it until it sank inside the frame. At this point, a soaking wet man in a uniform walked onstage, but was shot to death by the pair because "a captain always goes down with his ship!" As a matron (usually Chic's wife Catherine) walked the aisles yelling, "Oscar!", another loudly said that she was just going to use the bathroom. When this started to overwhelm, an actor started loudly selling tickets to the competing Broadway show I Married an Angel.

One gag had a man and his wife arguing continually in a box seat overlooking the stage. After a particularly violent round of insults, they wrestled to the floor and he would pop up and throw his wife(a mannequin) into the downstairs aisle.

Another joke--early in the show an "escape artist" would be locked into a strait-jacket and promise to escape in seconds. The man, still in the strait-jacket, would appear at odd moments in the show and when the show was over he'd be rolling around the floor in the lobby, still in the strait-jacket.

Theater owners weren't entirely happy with the show, because at least two dozen prime seats had to be reserved for audience "plants and stooges", rather than being sold for money.

== Songs ==
Lyrics and music by Sammy Fain and Charles Tobias (unless otherwise noted).

Act 1

- "Blow a Balloon Up to the Moon"
- "Fuddle-Dee-Duddle"
- "A Bedtime Story"
- "Strolling Thru the Park"
- "Abe Lincoln" (Music and Lyrics By Earl Robinson and Alfred Hayes)
- "Shaganola"
- "It's Time To Say Aloha"

Act 2

- "Harem on the Loose"
- "Ol' Man Mose'" (Music and Lyrics By Louis Armstrong and Zilner T. Randolph)
- "When You Look in Your Looking Glass" (Lyrics By Sam M. Lewis, Music By Paul Mann and Stephen Weiss)
- "When McGregor Sings Off Key"
- "Boomps-a-Daisy (I Like a Bustle that Bends)"
- "We Won't Let It Happen Here"

Songs featured during the run also include work by Don George, Teddy Hall, Annette Mills, Gonzalo Curiel, and Oscar Hammerstein II.

=== Revivals ===
A production of Hellzapoppin toured Australia in 1949-50 playing in Melbourne, Adelaide, Perth, and Sydney. The Australian shows were produced by J. C. Williamson’s, and featured a predominantly American cast including Don de Leo and George Mayo (as 'Olsen and Johnson'), Gloria Gilbert, Tom Toby, Marlene Lilyponds, Dorothy Jean, Snowball Whittier, Charlie Pope, trombonist Reg Thorpe, and David Hogarth. Various 'locals' joined the cast in some cities: Bob Dyer in Perth, and Roy Rene in Sydney. A production also played in Sydney in 1954, including female impersonator Maurice Millard.

In 1954, Hellzapoppin of 1954 played The Palladium in Sydney, Australia. In addition to Olsen & Johnson, this international production featured Marty May (Chic's son-in-law), singer Joan Elms, Hawaiian dancer Dell-Fin Thursday, juggler Lloyd Nairn, and banjoist and comedian Ken Card. Reviews were mixed, with The Sydney Morning Herald stating, "Noise was the predominant theme of Olsen and Johnson's "Hellzapoppin' of 1954," which opened at the Palladium on Saturday night. Desperate efforts were made, by means of fantastic tricks and freakish capers, to whip up some sort of comic frenzy. For all that, the show lacked enough touches of verve, sparkle, and spontaneity to put it into the top vaudeville class."

Theatrical producer Alexander H. Cohen had long remembered Hellzapoppin: "I was an 18-year-old stagestruck college student when Hellzapoppin opened, and I studied it like a textbook. I saw it 19 times during its run on Broadway." It was Cohen's fond hope to produce Hellzapoppin himself, and he purchased the rights "from the estate of Olsen and Johnson" in 1966. Within the year Cohen mounted a revival at Expo 67, the World's Fair at Montreal, featuring comedians Soupy Sales and Will B. Able (Willard Achorn), but it ran only a few performances. Cohen's plans for a Broadway opening were tabled in favor of a network-television special. A one-hour Hellzapoppin starring Jack Cassidy, Ronnie Schell, and Lynn Redgrave was aired by ABC-TV in 1972.

Cohen renewed his Broadway plans in 1976, as quoted by syndicated columnist Jack O'Brian: "I do think that to succeed today, a comedy revue requires a larger-than-life comic. That is why I have engaged Jerry Lewis to star in the new production of Hellzapoppin, which I'm preparing for the coming season." Cohen had been impressed by Lynn Redgrave in the TV revival, and signed her to appear opposite Lewis. The Broadway debut was scheduled for Sunday night, February 13, 1977. NBC-TV had committed $1,000,000 to Cohen for broadcasting the show's first act on national television. This was to be a TV first: live coverage of a Broadway opening night.

Out-of-town tryouts were staged in Washington, DC, Baltimore, and Boston to excellent business but mixed reviews. Things were just as chaotic backstage, as comedy star Lewis dominated the production and had serious arguments with producer Cohen, co-star Redgrave, and writer-adaptor Abe Burrows. "Lewis and Miss Redgrave had been having a much publicized feud," according to an account in the Pittsburgh Press. "He would neither rehearse nor perform any songs with her, reports said." The frantic activity extended to several sudden cast changes during the Boston run, including dancer Tommy Tune being called in on Saturday, January 15 to debut in a specialty act on the following Monday. The next day (Tuesday, January 18), NBC executives flew to Boston to see the show, and were so upset by what they saw that they expressed grave concerns to Cohen. The following day, Cohen abruptly closed the show and canceled both the Broadway engagement and the TV spectacular, forfeiting the million-dollar payment from NBC. "It's not ready for Broadway and cannot be made so in three remaining weeks before the opening," Cohen said. Cohen's spokesman subsequently announced that the stars would be replaced: "Recasting means recasting, and that's it." As reported by columnist Dan Lewis, "Those close to the producer expressed doubt that he would recast or revive the project -- that it was indeed a dead issue." NBC replaced the scheduled Hellzapoppin opening with the 1968 movie hit 2001: A Space Odyssey.

=== Film ===
Olsen & Johnson starred in the screen adaptation of Hellzapoppin', produced by Universal Pictures in 1941. Although the Broadway cast was initially slated to appear in the film, no one from any of the stage productions appeared in the film except Olsen & Johnson, Catherine Johnson, and the dance ensemble Whitey's Lindy Hoppers.

Hellzapoppin' was reissued to theaters in 1948 (by Realart Pictures) and released to local television stations in 1956. Universal withdrew the film in 1968 after Alexander H. Cohen bought the rights to the Olsen & Johnson show.
