= Nancy Walker =

American actress (1922–1992)

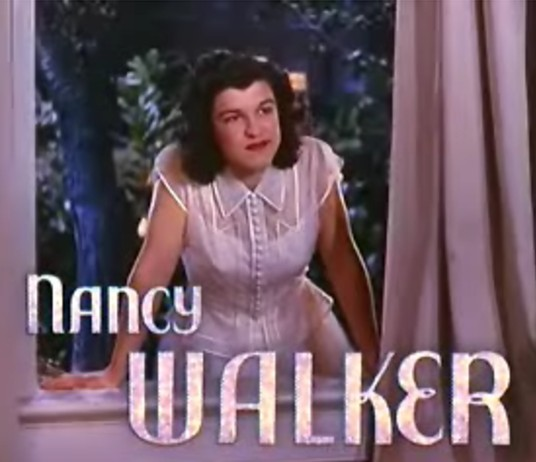
- Trailer for Best Foot Forward (1943)
- Born: Anna Myrtle Swoyer; May 10, 1922; Philadelphia, Pennsylvania, U.S.
- Died: March 25, 1992 (aged 69); Studio City, Los Angeles, California, U.S.
- Other name: Nan Barto
- Occupations: Actress; director
- Years active: 1937–1992
- Spouses: Gar Moore (m. 1948; div. 1949) David Craig (m. 1951)
- Children: 1
- Father: Dewey Barto

Nancy Walker (born Anna Myrtle Swoyer; (Note: Often mistranscribed as "Smoyer") May 10, 1922 – March 25, 1992) was an American actress of stage, screen, and television. She was also an occasional film and television director. During her five-decade-long career, she had long-running roles as Mildred on McMillan & Wife and as Ida Morgenstern on several episodes of The Mary Tyler Moore Show and on the spinoff series Rhoda as a prominent recurring character.

== Early life ==
Anna Myrtle Swoyer was born on May 10, 1922, in Philadelphia, the elder of two daughters. When she was 10 months old, she made her debut in vaudeville alongside her parents. She decided to become an actress at the age of 10.

== Acting career ==
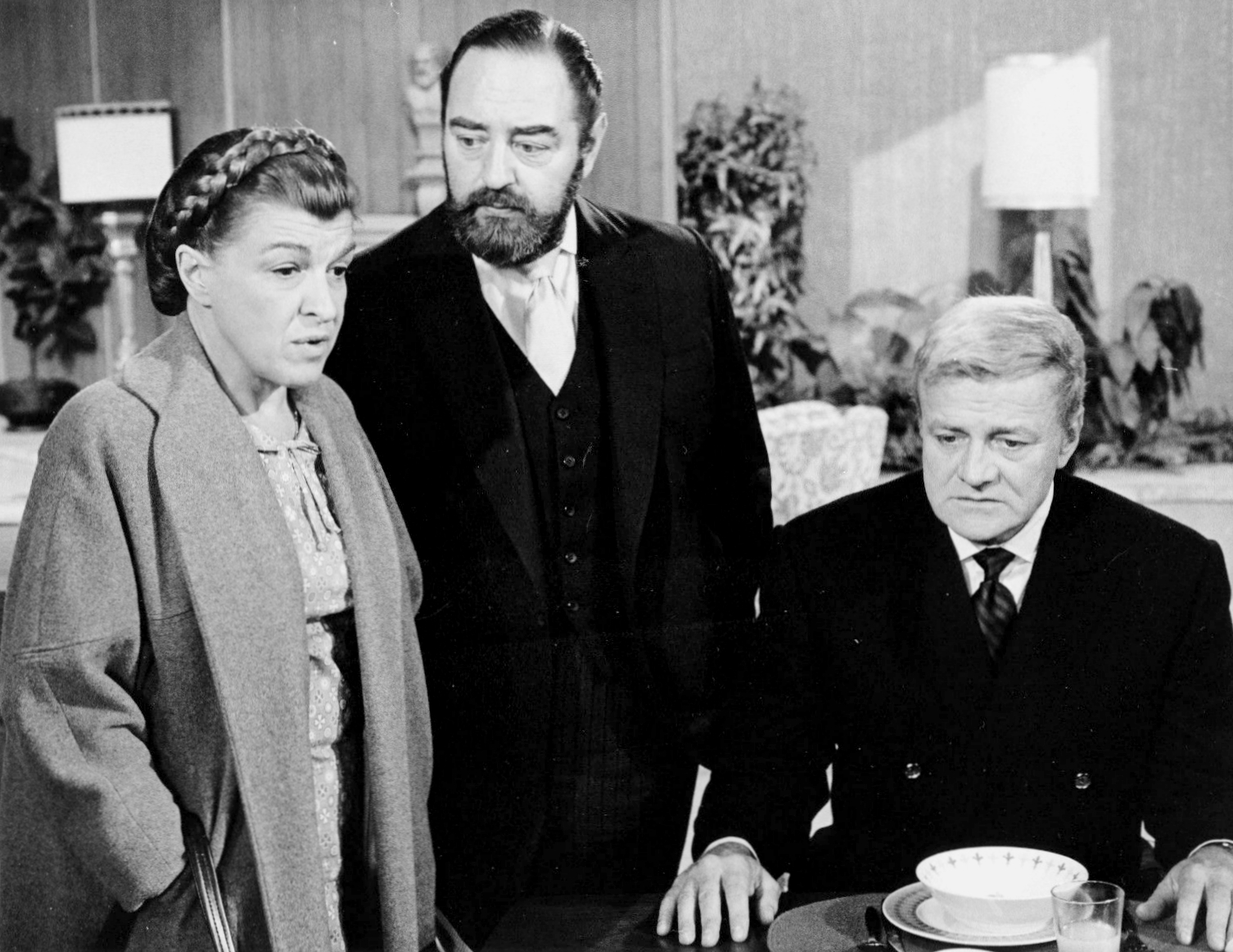
Nancy Walker, Sebastian Cabot, and Brian Keith on Family Affair (1970)

In 1937, as "Nan Barto", Walker appeared on the NBC radio programs Coast to Coast on a Bus and Our Barn. She made her Broadway debut in 1941 in Best Foot Forward. The role provided Walker with her film debut, when she signed a contract with Metro-Goldwyn-Mayer to appear in the 1943 film version, starring Lucille Ball. She also appeared with Mickey Rooney and Judy Garland in the second film version of Girl Crazy (1943). Her next film, Broadway Rhythm, in which she had a featured musical number backed by Tommy Dorsey and His Orchestra, "Milkman, Keep Those Bottles Quiet", ended Walker's contract with MGM.

She continued acting throughout the 1940s and 1950s, originating the roles of Hildy Eszterhazy ("I Can Cook, Too!") in On the Town (1944), Yetta Samovar in Barefoot Boy with Cheek (1947), and Lily Malloy in Look, Ma, I'm Dancin'! (1948) on Broadway. She was nominated for a Tony Award in 1956 for her work in the musical revue Phoenix '55, and again in 1960 for her performance in Do Re Mi, opposite Phil Silvers.

Walker also starred in the short-lived Broadway musical comedy Copper and Brass in 1957, and appeared in the 1958 New York City Center production of Wonderful Town. For the early 1970s revival of A Funny Thing Happened on the Way to the Forum, she appeared again opposite Silvers, playing the character of Domina. Owing to her television contractual responsibilities, she was unable to transfer with the show to Broadway. Her musical appearances led to record releases, including I Hate Men (1959; with Sid Bass and his orchestra, featuring such show tunes as "I'm Gonna Wash That Man Right Outa My Hair", and "You Irritate Me So"); the cover featured Walker humorously sticking male dolls with pins.

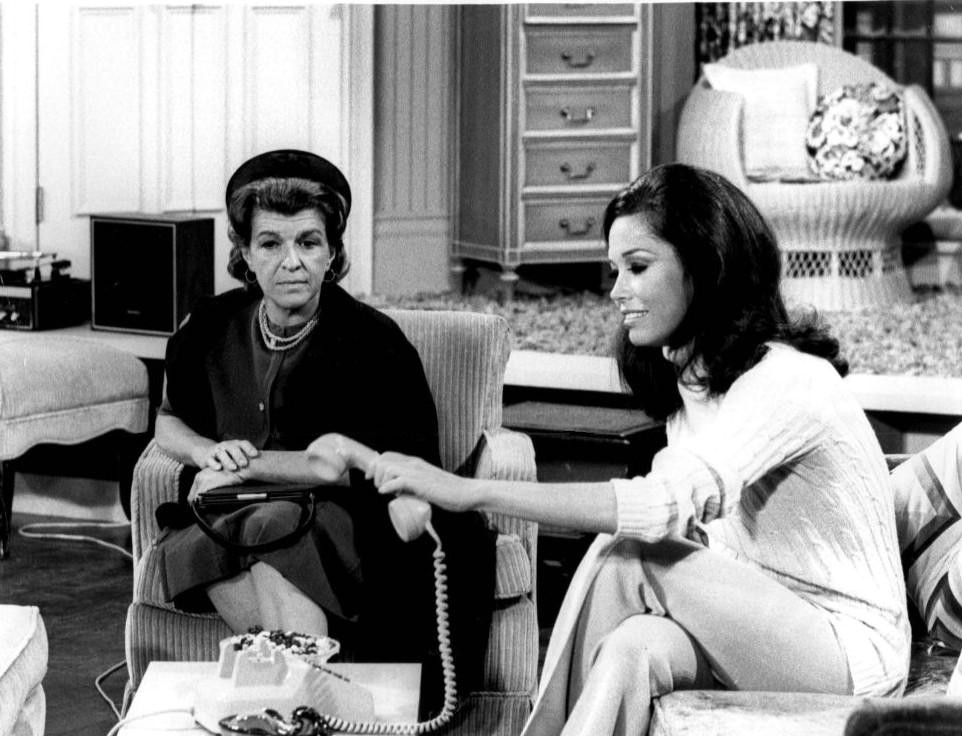
Walker's first appearance as Ida Morgenstern on The Mary Tyler Moore Show, 1970

Dozens of television guest appearances and recurring roles followed, providing her with steady work. Her career spanned five decades and included comedies, dramas, and television variety shows such as Faye Emerson's Wonderful Town, The Garry Moore Show, and The Carol Burnett Show.

In the 1960–61 television season, she appeared in two episodes of NBC's The Tab Hunter Show. In 1970, she secured a recurring role as Emily, the housekeeper, on the television series Family Affair, which starred Brian Keith. After five seasons, though, the ratings of Family Affair had plummeted opposite NBC's popular The Flip Wilson Show. The series was canceled at the end of that season.

In 1970, she also made her first appearance playing Ida Morgenstern, the mother of Valerie Harper's character Rhoda Morgenstern on the first season of The Mary Tyler Moore Show. The role proved to be ideal for her. The episode that introduced her character, "Support Your Local Mother", was so well received that it won an Emmy for Outstanding Writing Achievement in a Comedy Series for James L. Brooks and Allan Burns. Walker thereafter became an annual guest star on the show for the next three years. When the MTM spinoff series Rhoda premiered in 1974, Walker was a regular cast member in 41 episodes.

From 1971 to 1976, she was a regular on the successful Rock Hudson detective series McMillan & Wife, playing the McMillans' housekeeper, Mildred. During the first two years of Rhoda, Walker was not featured every week, so she was able to shuttle back and forth between the CBS sitcom and the NBC detective series. These two roles brought her seven Emmy Award nominations. In 1976, ABC-TV offered Walker a contract to headline her own series, The Nancy Walker Show, which was produced by Norman Lear's production company, in which she starred as Nancy Kittredge, a talent agent. Walker appeared on a second-season episode of The Muppet Show.

Before she filmed the first episode of the series, Walker made her only appearance on Rhoda for the 1976–77 season. In the season premiere, "The Separation", Rhoda (Valerie Harper) and her husband Joe (David Groh) decide to separate. Rhoda tries to keep the news from her mother Ida (Walker), since Ida is about to embark on a year-long trip across America with Rhoda's father (Harold Gould). Ida learns the truth from Rhoda prior to Ida's departure.

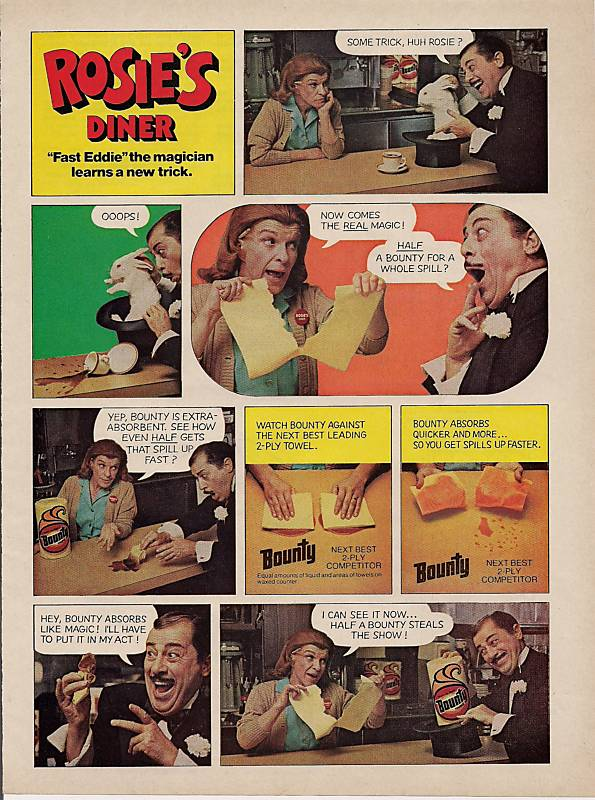
Walker as Rosie in a 1977 magazine ad with Vito Scotti

Almost immediately, Garry Marshall signed Walker for another series, Blansky's Beauties. The main character of the series was introduced a week before the series premiere in an episode of the hit sitcom, Happy Days. The show premiered on ABC-TV in February 1977 with Walker playing Nancy Blansky, den mother to a group of Las Vegas showgirls. It failed to find an audience and was canceled in May 1977, giving Walker the unenviable distinction of being in two failed series in the same year. She returned to Rhoda at the beginning of the 1977–78 season (giving the show a much-needed boost in the ratings, which had fallen the previous year), and remained with the series for the rest of its run. During this time, she began directing, including episodes of The Mary Tyler Moore Show, Rhoda, 13 Queens Boulevard, and Alice.

One of Walker's last major film roles was in the 1976 all-star comedy spoof Murder by Death. She continued to remain active in show business until her death, playing Rosie, a New Jersey diner waitress in a series of commercials for Bounty paper towels from 1970 to 1990. She helped make the product's slogan, "the quicker picker-upper", a common catchphrase. She credited the towel commercials with landing her the role of Ida Morgenstern.

Among her final guest appearances in a television series was the recurring role of Aunt Angela, Sophia Petrillo's (Estelle Getty) widowed sister, on The Golden Girls, for which she received an Emmy Award nomination. Golden Girls creator Susan Harris then cast Walker opposite Bruce Weitz in her NBC sitcom project Mama's Boy, which aired as six comedy specials during the 1987–88 season, but never reached series status.

In 1990, Walker began starring on the Fox sitcom True Colors as Sara Bower, the outspoken mother of Ellen Davis Freeman (Stephanie Faracy), who moves into Ellen's household despite having objections to her daughter's interracial marriage. In 1990, Walker appeared as herself in the Columbo episode "Uneasy Lies the Crown".

== Directing career ==
Walker had guest starred as Rhoda's mother Ida Morgenstern in several episodes of The Mary Tyler Moore Show, and continued that role in its spin-off Rhoda. After establishing the character, Walker directed some episodes of both series, along with episodes of other situation comedy series.

In 1980, Walker made her feature-film directorial debut, directing disco group The Village People and Olympian Caitlyn Jenner in the pseudo-biographical musical Can't Stop the Music. The film was a box-office failure, and Walker's sole feature-film directorial credit. Filmink argued that although Walker's "contribution was routinely dismissed by film bro critics (“she was old! No other features!”)... her direction is perfectly competent and the whole movie is infused with a great deal of fun and adequate performances, especially considering so many of the cast were inexperienced."

After the film, she did some stage and television directing, including three episodes of the situation comedy Alice.

== Personal life ==
Walker was 1.50 m - 4'11", the same height as her father, Dewey Barto of Barto and Mann. Walker was married twice. Her first husband was Gar Moore, whom she wed on August 1, 1948. They divorced within 10 months. She remarried, to musical theater teacher David Craig on January 29, 1951, and their daughter, Miranda Craig, was born in 1953. David Craig died in 1998 at the age of 75 from lung cancer.

Walker was also a close friend of actor Montgomery Clift. Biographer Patricia Bosworth stated the two first met in 1948, but did not become good friends until 10 years later, after Clift's disfiguring car accident. Bosworth adds that Walker would sustain him as his dearest friend for the rest of his life; their relationship was one of mutual support – whereas most of Clift's friends assumed he needed to be looked after, or else left alone, Walker stated, "he needed to be needed", adding "I liked his face better after the accident; his strength shone through." Clift nicknamed friends for whom he felt particular affection, and he called Walker "Nanny".

== Death ==
Walker died of lung cancer on March 25, 1992, at age 69, in Studio City, California.

== Filmography ==
Film
Year	Title	Role	Notes
1943	Best Foot Forward	Nancy – Blind Date	
1943	Girl Crazy	Polly Williams	
1944	Broadway Rhythm	Trixie Simpson	
1954	Lucky Me	Flo Neely	
1972	Stand Up and Be Counted	Agnes	
1973	The World's Greatest Athlete	Mrs. Petersen	
1973	40 Carats	Mrs. Margie Margolin	
1975	Death Scream	Mrs. Jacobs	
1976	Won Ton Ton, the Dog Who Saved Hollywood	Mrs. Fromberg	
1976	Murder by Death	Maid	
Television
Year	Title	Role	Notes
1959	The World of Sholom Aleichem	Wife	Play of the Week "Tale of Chelm"
1959–1964	The Garry Moore Show	Herself	Regular guest star (13 episodes)
1960	The Tab Hunter Show	Buddy Parker	Episode: "I Love a Marine"
1970–1971	Family Affair	Emily Turner	Recurring role (6 episodes)
1971–1974	The Mary Tyler Moore Show	Ida Morgenstern	Recurring role (4 episodes)
1971–1976	McMillan & Wife	Mildred	Main cast (32 episodes)
1972	Bridget Loves Bernie	Aunt Ruthie	Episode: "The Little White Lie That Grew"
1973	The Partridge Family	Mrs. Applebaum	Episode: "Aspirin at 7, dinner at 8"
1974	Thursday's Game	Mrs. Bender	Television film
1974–1978	Rhoda	Ida Morgenstern	Main cast (42 episodes)
1976–1977	The Nancy Walker Show	Nancy Kitteridge	Main role (13 episodes)
1977	Blansky's Beauties	Nancy Blansky	Main role (13 episodes)
1977	The Muppet Show	Herself	Guest Star (1 episode)
1978	Fantasy Island	Mumsy	Episode: "The Common Man"
1982	Trapper John, M.D.	Harriett Krieger	Episode: "42"
1987	The Golden Girls	Angela	Recurring role (2 episodes)
1987–1988	Mama's Boy	Molly McCaskey	Main role (6 episodes)
1989	Newhart	Aunt Louise	Episode: "Attack of the Killer Aunt"
1990	Columbo	Herself	Episode: "Uneasy Lies the Crown"
1990–1992	True Colors	Sara Bower	Main cast (46 episodes)

== Stage/musical theatre work ==
- Best Foot Forward (1941)
- On the Town (1944–1946)
- Barefoot Boy with Cheek (1947)
- Look, Ma, I'm Dancin'! (1948)
- Along Fifth Avenue (1949)
- The Roaring Girl (1951)
- Pal Joey (1952; succeeding Helen Gallagher)
- Phoenix '55 (1955)
- Fallen Angels (1956; 1966)
- Desk Set (1957)
- Copper and Brass (1957)
- Wonderful Town (1958)
- The Girls Against the Boys (1959)
- Do Re Mi (1960–1962)
- Everybody Loves Opal (1962)
- Folies Bergère (1964)
- UTBU (1966) (as director)
- Luv (1967)
- The Cherry Orchard (1968)
- The Cocktail Party (1968)
- A Funny Thing Happened on the Way to the Forum (1971)
- Sondheim: A Musical Tribute (1973)

== Sources ==
- Thomas S. Hischak. The Oxford Companion to the American Musical: theatre, film, and television (June 2008), Oxford University Press, USA (ISBN 0195335333)
