= Mary Howard de Liagre =

American actress

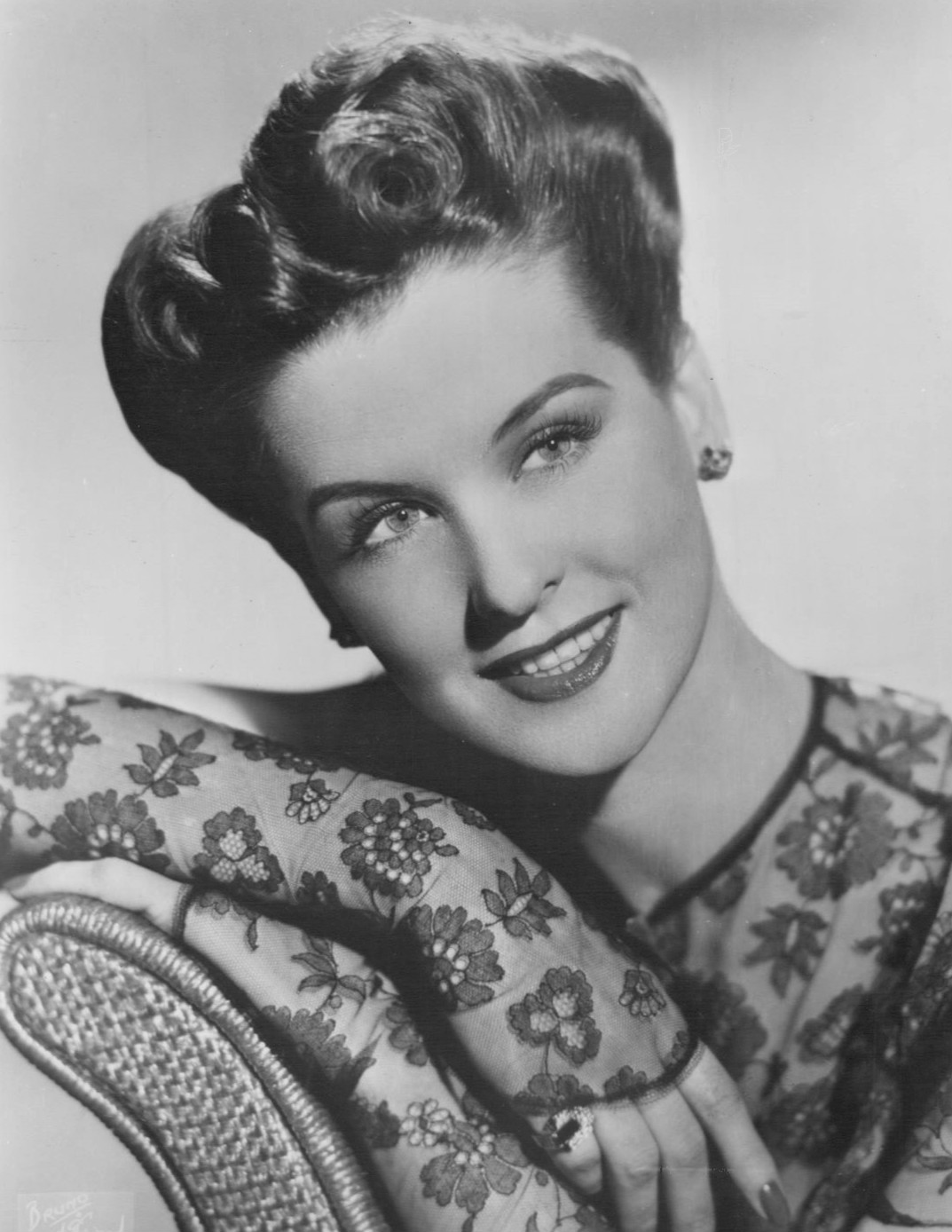
- Mary Howard de Liagre in 1951
- Born: Mary Howard; May 18, 1913; Independence, Kansas, U.S.
- Died: June 6, 2009 (aged 96); Manhattan, New York City, U.S.
- Occupations: Actress, singer
- Years active: 1933–1942
- Spouse: Alfred De Liagre Jr. (1945–1987) (his death) (2 children)

Mary Howard de Liagre (May 18, 1913 – June 6, 2009) was an American actress usually credited as Mary Howard.

Howard came from Tulsa, Oklahoma, and took dancing lessons when she was in kindergarten. Among her dancing instructors was Albertina Rasch. She began her entertainment career as a dancer, performing in shows in New York City when she was 14. That talent ran in her family, as two older sisters were in the Ziegfeld Follies.

Howard's first film employment came when she signed a stock contract with Louis B. Mayer. Although she appeared in few films, she used the first six months to have her teeth straightened and the second six months to learn to act.

Howard helped organize the USO in Los Angeles during World War II and toured for returning servicemen.

In 1945, she moved to New York City and married Alfred de Liagre Jr., a theater producer who died in 1987. She was a founding member of Recording for the Blind, and served on the boards of the American Academy of Dramatic Arts, and the Princess Grace Foundation.

== Partial filmography ==
- The Great Ziegfeld (1936) as Miss Carlisle (uncredited)
- Torture Money (1937, Short, Academy Award for Best Short Subject, Two-reel) as Nurse Barry (uncredited)
- All Over Town (1937) as Joan Eldridge
- Man-Proof (1938) as First Girl (uncredited)
- Paradise for Three (1938) as Showering Woman (uncredited)
- Test Pilot (1938) as Movie Leading Lady (uncredited)
- Hold That Kiss (1938) as Nurse in Moving Picture (uncredited)
- Fast Company (1938) as Leah Brockler
- Marie Antoinette (1938) as Olivia (uncredited)
- The Shopworn Angel (1938) as Chorus Girl (uncredited)
- Love Finds Andy Hardy (1938) as Mrs. Tompkins
- Sweethearts (1938) as Chorus Girl (uncredited)
- Four Girls in White (1939) as Mary Forbes
- Nurse Edith Cavell (1939) as Nurse O'Brien
- Abe Lincoln in Illinois (1940) as Ann Rutledge
- The Wild Man of Borneo (1941) as Mary Thompson
- Billy the Kid (1941) as Edith Keating
- Riders of the Purple Sage (1941) as Jane Withersteen
- Swamp Water (1941) as Hannahas
- Who Is Hope Schuyler? (1942) as Diane Rossiter
- Thru Different Eyes (1942) as Constance Gardner
- The Loves of Edgar Allan Poe (1942) as Frances Allan (final film role)
