= Robert Bean (artist) =

Canadian photographer

Robert Bean is an artist, writer and teacher living in Halifax, Nova Scotia.

Born and raised in Saskatchewan, he moved to Nova Scotia in 1976 to pursue a career in contemporary art and education. He obtained a BFA from the Nova Scotia College of Art and Design (NSCAD University) in 1978, and an MA in Cultural Studies from the University of Leeds, England in 1999. He is currently an associate professor at NSCAD University. Bean has exhibited his work in solo and group exhibitions in Canada, the United States, Europe, South America and New Zealand.

== Exhibitions and projects ==
Bean has published articles on photography, art and culture, written catalogue essays and undertaken curatorial projects. He has received grants and awards from the Canada Council for the Arts, the Ontario Arts Council and the Social Sciences and Humanities Research Council of Canada. Bean’s work is in public and private collections, including the Nova Scotia Art Bank, the Canada Council Art Bank, the Art Gallery of Nova Scotia and the Canadian Museum of Contemporary Photography. Commissions include the Royal Architectural institute of Canada and the Toronto Photographers Workshop (Gallery TPW).

Robert Bean curated the video exhibition “Future Perfect” for the Centre for Art Tapes, Halifax in 2004. This exhibition featured the work of Stan Denniston, Johnnie Eisen and Kelly Richardson. Other curatorial projects included the exhibition “Historical Photographs from the Collection of the university College of Cape Breton” at the Anna Leonowens Gallery in Halifax, N.S. and the Art Gallery of the university of Cape Breton, Sydney, N.S.

Robert Bean had a solo exhibition of his photographic work “Lapsus” at the Dalhousie University Art Gallery in January 2005. His audio work “Silenzio” was produced in conjunction with the exhibition “Disquiet” at Modern Fuel Gallery, Kingston, Ontario. “Silenzio” is an audio work based on the aural sensations of the Sistine Chapel. Christof Migone is the curator of “Disquiet” and the distributor of “Silenzio”. Robert Bean’s solo exhibition “Verbatim” was exhibited at Toronto gallery akau inc. in January 2006. Commissions include the Royal Architectural institute of Canada and the Toronto Photographers Workshop (Gallery TPW).

Bean also edited a book of essays on Contemporary Canadian Photography for Gallery 44 in Toronto. The book “Image and Inscription: An anthology of Contemporary Canadian Photography” was published by Gallery 44 and the YYZ Press in November 2005.
