= Riders of the Purple Sage (1925 film) =

1925 film

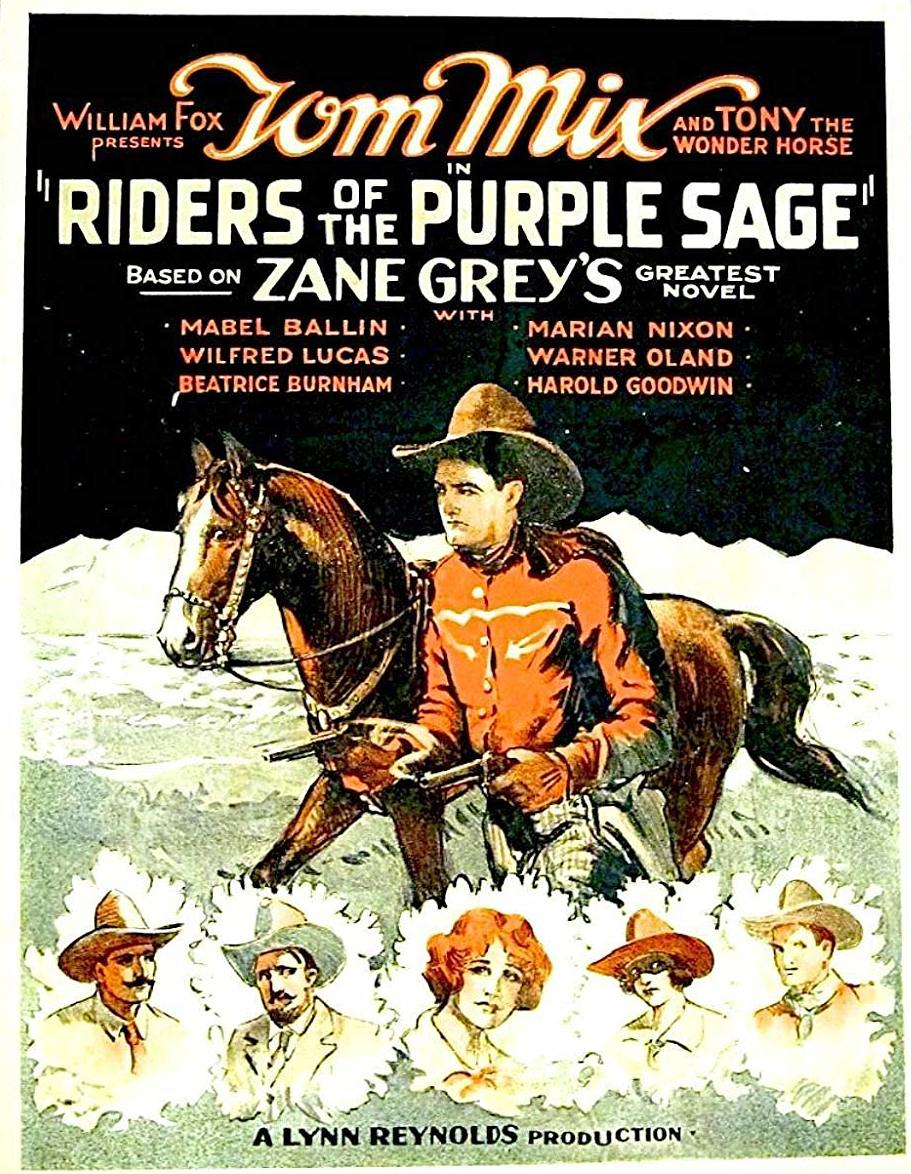
- Theatrical release poster
- Directed by: Lynn Reynolds
- Written by: Edfrid A. Bingham
- Based on: Riders of the Purple Sage by Zane Grey
- Starring: Tom Mix; Mabel Ballin; Warner Oland
- Cinematography: Daniel B. Clark
- Music by: William P. Perry (1971 reissue)
- Production company: Fox Film Corporation
- Distributed by: Fox Film Corporation
- Release date: March 15, 1925 (USA)
- Running time: 56 minutes 5,578 feet (6 reels)
- Country: United States
- Language: Silent (English intertitles)

Riders of the Purple Sage is a 1925 American silent Western film directed by Lynn Reynolds and starring Tom Mix, Mabel Ballin, and Warner Oland. Based on the 1912 novel Riders of the Purple Sage by Zane Grey, the film is about a former Texas Ranger who pursues a corrupt lawyer who abducted his married sister and niece. His search leads him to a remote Arizona ranch and the love of a good woman.

== Plot ==
The full film

When corrupt lawyer Lew Walters is run out of a Texas town, he abducts Millie Erne and her young daughter Bess and forces them to accompany him, mortally wounding and leaving behind a heartbroken husband and father. Millie's brother, Texas Ranger Jim Carson, leaves his service behind, takes the name Jim Lassiter, and dedicates his life to finding Walters and his sister and niece. After many years, his search leads him to Cottonwood, Arizona, and the ranch of Jane Withersteen. Jane is attracted to the stranger after he rescues her chief rider, Bern Venders, from being flogged for a crime he did not commit. She tells him that Millie died while searching for her daughter after little Bess was abducted.

Lassiter and Venters go after a gang of rustlers who have been raiding the Withersteen ranch and stealing their cattle. They wound and capture the masked leader of the gang, who turns out to be a young beautiful woman. She is revealed to be Bess Erne, Lassiter's long-lost niece. Venters takes charge of the wounded girl, taking her to a secret location, Surprise Valley. The two soon fall in love, and leave the valley to marry.

Meanwhile, Jane admits to Lassiter that the man he is hunting, Lew Walters, is in fact a local judge, now calling himself Judge Dyer. Lassiter rides into town and rushes into Dyer's courtroom, shooting the villain with deadly precision. Soon after, a posse is formed and goes after Lassiter, who flees with Jane and her adopted ward, Fay Larkin, into the mountains surrounding Surprise Valley. They take refuge from their pursuers on a high plateau overlooking the entrance to the valley. The only approach to their hiding place is by a set of stairs cut into the side of the cliff. Lassiter rolls a boulder down from the heights to block the posse's path. There is now no way out. He, Jane and little Fay are trapped inside Surprise Valley forever.

== Cast ==
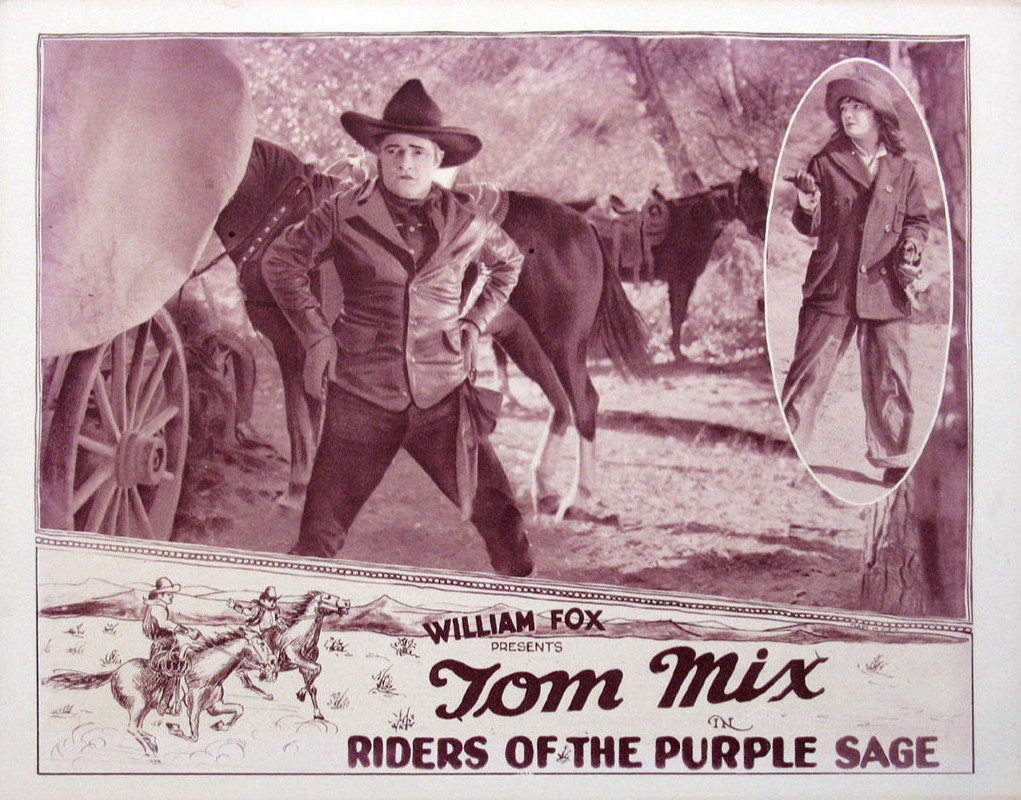
Lobby card

- Tom Mix as Jim Carson / Jim Lassiter
- Mabel Ballin as Jane Withersteen
- Warner Oland as Lew Walkers / Judge Dyer
- Beatrice Burnham as Millie Erne
- Arthur Morrison as Frank Erne
- Wilfred Lucas as Oldring
- Charles Le Moyne as Richard Tull
- Harold Goodwin as Bern Venters
- Hank Bell as Barfly (uncredited)
- Gary Cooper as Rider (uncredited)
- Seessel Anne Johnson as Bess Erne, as a Child (uncredited)
- Fred Kohler as Henchman Tom Metzger (uncredited)
- Charles Newton as Henchman Joe Herd (uncredited)
- Marian Nixon as Bess Erne (uncredited)
- Joe Rickson as Henchman Dave Slack (uncredited)
- Anne Shirley as Fay Larkin (uncredited)
- Mark Hamilton as Outlaw in Mr Tull's Gang (uncredited)
- Tony the Wonder Horse as Jim's horse

== Production ==
Riders of the Purple Sage was filmed on location in Lone Pine, California and the nearby Alabama Hills. The film features an uncredited bit role by future film star Gary Cooper as a rider. Warner Oland, who plays the corrupt lawyer Lew Walters, would later star in the Charlie Chan films.

== Reception ==
Riders of the Purple Sage received generally poor reviews upon its theatrical release. The reviewer for The New York Times criticized the film's lack of entertainment quality, while acknowledging Tom Mix's appeal and attraction to his fans. The reviewer for Variety wrote:

It is all right to understand Mix and know what his admirers want, but it would be just as well to recollect that adults watch Mix pictures also, and it would be just as well if some of these directorial absurdities were omitted or made to blend.

In his review for Allmovie, Hans J. Wollstein gave the film a positive review, praising Tom Mix for his performance.

It is almost as if Zane Grey had written his 1911 melodrama Riders of the Purple Sage with Tom Mix in mind, Mix is that well-cast as the vengeful but honorable Jim Lassiter. Not that Mix completely submerges himself in the role; in fact, there is still plenty of showmanship in evidence here. Especially in a funny scene in which Lassiter forces a gang of cutthroats to fight each other at gunpoint. But the preeminent Western star of his generation makes as good and as taciturn a hero as any that would come after him, including George O'Brien, George Montgomery, and Ed Harris. As usual, Mix is well-served by Lynn Reynolds, his favorite director at Fox, and a strong supporting cast that includes Warner Oland as the kidnapper and debaucher Lew Walters, Beatrice Burnham as Lassiter's ill-fated sister-in-law, and Mabel Ballin as the imperiled Jane Withersteen.

== Preservation ==
A 16 mm print of the film is held by George Eastman House.

== See also ==
- Riders of the Purple Sage
