= Riders of the Purple Sage (1996 film) =

1996 TV film

- DVD cover
- Genre: Western
- Based on: Riders of the Purple Sage by Zane Grey
- Screenplay by: Gill Dennis
- Directed by: Charles Haid
- Starring: Ed Harris; Amy Madigan; Henry Thomas; Robin Tunney
- Theme music composer: Arthur Kempel
- Country of origin: United States
- Original language: English

Production
- Executive producers: Ed Harris; Amy Madigan; David A. Rosemont
- Producer: Thomas John Kane
- Production location: Moab, Utah
- Cinematography: William Wages
- Editor: David Holden
- Running time: 98 minutes
- Production companies: Amer Productions; Rosemont Productions International; Zeke Productions

Original release
- Network: TNT
- Release: January 21, 1996

Riders of the Purple Sage is a 1996 American Western television film, based on the 1912 novel by Zane Grey, directed by Charles Haid. It was adapted by Gil Dennis, and stars Ed Harris as Lassiter and Amy Madigan as Jane Withersteen. It is the fifth screen adaptation of Grey's novel across an eight-decade span. The film aired on TNT on January 21, 1996.

== Plot ==
Spinster homesteader Jane Withersteen joins forces with Jim Lassiter, a mysterious gunslinger and wanted man, to protect her land and cattle from the powerful Deacon Tull who, with the aid of the local pastor Dyer, has the town turned against her. Lassiter, however, also has his own agenda.

== Cast ==
- Ed Harris as Jim Lassiter
- Amy Madigan as Jane Withersteen
- Henry Thomas as Bern Venters
- Robin Tunney as Elizabeth "Bess" Erne
- Norbert Weisser as Deacon Tull
- G.D. Spradlin as Pastor Dyer

== Reception ==
Variety described the film as "moody" and said, "Charles Haid directs efficiently, with occasional moments of artiness — including filming a falling horse from several angles and cross-editing them, and action in a genuinely spooky thunderstorm."
