= Chic Johnson =

American comedian

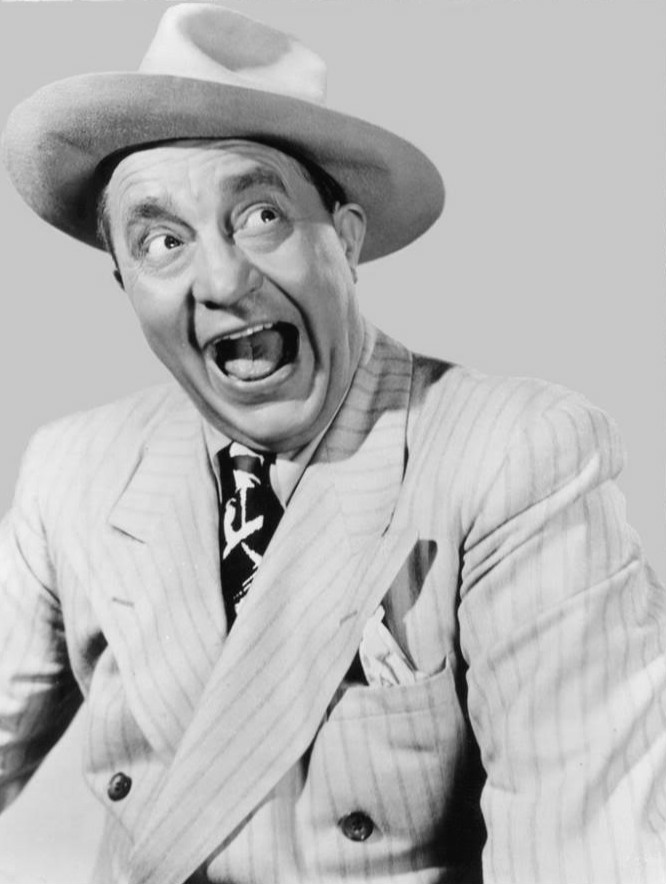
- Johnson in 1954
- Born: Harold Ogden Johnson; April 15, 1891; Chicago, U.S.
- Died: February 26, 1962 (aged 70); Las Vegas, Nevada, U.S.
- Occupations: Vaudevillian, comedian
- Years active: 1930–1956

Harold Ogden "Chic" Johnson (March 15, 1891 – February 26, 1962) was half of the American comedy team of Olsen and Johnson, known for his ebullient personality.

== Background ==
Johnson was born of Swedish descent in Chicago to John M. and Matilda C. (née Carlson) Johnson.

== Career ==
Johnson was a ragtime pianist and met his partner Ole Olsen, a violinist, when they were hired by the same band. Following the breakup of the band, they started doing comedy and by 1918 were vaudeville headliners.

Olsen and Johnson were given contracts by Warner Bros. in 1930 to appear as the comic relief in a number of musicals including Oh, Sailor Behave (1930), Gold Dust Gertie (1931) and a Technicolor version of Fifty Million Frenchmen (1931). 1931 saw a backlash against musicals, resulting in the studio removing all the songs from Fifty Million Frenchmen. To make up for the deleted scenes, new comedy scenes were filmed with Olsen and Johnson, who became the stars by default.

In 1936, they signed with Republic Pictures for two comedies, Country Gentlemen (1936) and All Over Town (1937). In 1939 Olsen and Johnson produced the Broadway revue Streets of Paris, which starred Bobby Clark and introduced the comedy team of Bud Abbott and Lou Costello to Broadway audiences. The show opened for the summer on June 19, 1939 and became such a hit that the run extended through the fall of 1940.

Olsen and Johnson produced and starred in Hellzapoppin, a Broadway revue, which opened at the 46th Street Theater on September 22, 1938, and ran for a record 1,404 performances. The show included gags played on stooges planted in the audience (one winner of a so-called raffle had a block of ice placed in his lap) as well as actual paying customers. It became a hit despite a lukewarm critical reception, thanks in part to the influence of newspaper columnist and radio personality Walter Winchell.

Hellzapoppin was followed by two other Broadway hits. Sons o' Fun opened December 1, 1941, just six days before the attack on Pearl Harbor, and ran for 742 performances. Laffing Room Only opened on December 23, 1944, and ran for 232 performances.

Hellzapoppin was adapted into a film released in 1941. Assisted by Marx Brothers screenwriter Nat Perrin, Olsen and Johnson used the film as an opportunity to satirize Hollywood and riff on conventional moviemaking. The picture, a movie within a movie within a play within a movie, foreshadowed a style of comedy that would later find its way into the films of Mel Brooks, Who Framed Roger Rabbit and TV's Mystery Science Theater 3000. The film is also known for having what many consider to be the finest example of swing dancing ever put on film, performed by Whitey's Lindy Hoppers (here billed as the Harlem Congeroo Dancers) with Frankie Manning.

Pleased with the film's box office performance, Universal signed the team for three more features. Crazy House (1943) had Olsen and Johnson running amok through the Universal studio and evacuating the staff. Ghost Catchers (1944) had Ole and Chic helping singer Gloria Jean make her Carnegie Hall debut despite strange happenings in a spooky old house. See My Lawyer (1945) was a patchwork of vaudeville acts, with Olsen and Johnson absent from most of the proceedings.

== Later years ==
Olsen and Johnson made their television debut in 1949 on Fireball Fun-For-All, a summer replacement for Texaco Star Theater starring Milton Berle. They followed this with another variety show, All-Star Revue.

In 1950 they returned to Broadway for one last Broadway revue, Pardon Our French, which ran for three months. Olsen and Johnson continued to preside over rowdy revues into the 1950s, including a 1959 production at Flushing Meadows in Queens, NY, called "Hellz-a-Splashin': An Aqua-cade."

On June 21, 1953, they appeared together as the "mystery guests" on What's My Line?. Every time the blindfolded panelists guessed the wrong comedy team, Chic Johnson glared at them with mock anger.

In the late 1950s illness forced Chic Johnson to retire from show-business, while Ole Olsen continued to work as a solo performer. When Milton Berle was hosting NBC's Jackpot Bowling in 1960, Olsen acted as a straight man to Berle's antics. Olsen's live comic routine was interrupted by Ralph Edwards and a This Is Your Life tribute featuring Olsen's family and friends and breaks for Olsen and Johnson sight gags. The final guest was Chic Johnson, who ran on-camera in his stage costume and reunited with his old friend and partner.

Chic Johnson died of kidney failure on February 26, 1962, in Las Vegas. He was buried on March 1, 1962, and eventually joined in an adjacent plot by Ole Olsen in Palm Desert Memorial cemetery in Las Vegas.

== See also ==
- Olsen and Johnson

== Other sources ==
- Maltin, Leonard. Movie Comedy Teams (New York: Signet, 1970, revised 1985)
