= Ole Olsen (comedian) =

Vaudevillian and Comedian

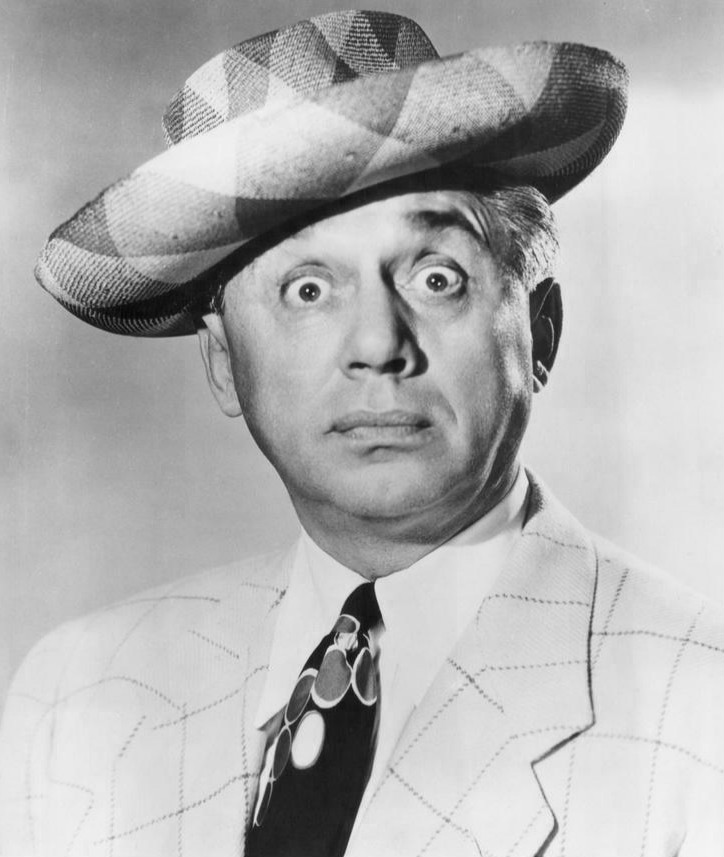
- Olsen in 1952
- Born: John Sigvard Olsen; November 6, 1892; Peru, Indiana, U.S.
- Died: January 26, 1963 (aged 70); Albuquerque, New Mexico, U.S.
- Occupations: Vaudevillian, comedian
- Years active: 1914–1960
- Spouse(s): Lillian Louise Clem (m. 1912; divorced) Eileen Maria Osthoff (m. 1961)
- Children: 4, including Moya
- Relatives: John Lear (grandson); Bill Lear (son-in-law)

John Sigvard "Ole" Olsen (November 6, 1892 – January 26, 1963) was an American comedian. He was half of the Olsen and Johnson comedy team, formed in 1914, who became stars of vaudeville, radio, the Broadway stage, motion pictures, and television. Their shows were noted for their crazy blackout gags and orchestrated mayhem ("anything can happen, and it probably will"). Olsen and Johnson's most famous production was the stage musical (and later movie) Hellzapoppin.

== Library of gags ==
Olsen and Johnson used hundreds of gag props and mechanical devices over the course of their partnership. As vaudevillians they safeguarded some of these specialties by submitting detailed descriptions and diagrams to National Vaudeville Artists, Inc.'s Protected Material Department, "extensively used for years by the creators of gags, routines, skits, stunts, and unique specialties." Fellow vaudeville comedian Fred Allen described the procedure in his memoir:

"Any member could protect his act. All he had to do was to enclose a copy of his material in a sealed envelope and deliver it to the N.V.A. office. The envelope was placed in the Protected Material files. Later, if a plagiarist was brought to bay, the act preferred charges, the sealed envelope was opened, and the N.V.A. officials dispensed justice. Hundreds of acts protected their material through this service. After Albee's death, vaudeville started over the hill and took the N.V.A. club with it."

The N.V.A. office finally discontinued the Protected Material Department on September 15, 1947, "owing to lack of space." The originators of the material were invited to claim it in person; after 30 days the N.V.A. would dispose of the files left unclaimed. Ole Olsen remembered the storehouse of gags contained in the files, and purchased all of the remaining material that had been abandoned.

Olsen had long been a collector of theatrical memorabilia. In June 1947 he paid $5,000 ($71,703 in 2025) for the entire published and unpublished material—40 years' worth—of author James Madison. Madison's Budget was a regularly published compendium of jokes, sketches, and song lyrics sold to vaudevillians at one dollar per issue. Olsen also bought the effects of stage producer Ned Wayburn, including many Will Rogers monologues.

By the 1950s Olsen had compiled a comprehensive library of venerable gag material, storing it on his property in Malverne, Long Island. He valued the library at $250,000 ($2,845,186 in 2025) and made it available to professional writers in 1957. This was front-page news for Variety, which described the "humor library" as containing "over 3,000 volumes, including the original Joe Miller books and a complete collection of Punch. All gags are cross-filed. Olsen will let would-be humorists look at it by the hour at the following rates: $100 per hour for all you can tape record; $50 per hour for all you can write down; and $25 an hour for all you can remember."

== Personal life ==
Olsen was married twice. He had four children with his first wife, Lillian Clem: John Charles, Robert Clem, Joy, and Moya. They were later divorced. Robert Clem died of miliary tuberculosis at age 2. J. C. Olsen, an actor, died by suicide in 1956. Moya married William P. Lear of Learjet fame in 1942. Ole was involved in a serious automobile accident in 1950 and recuperated at the Lear home.

In June 1961, Ole married Eileen Maria Osthoff, a dancer and choreographer whom he had known for eight years. Olsen is remembered for the quote, "May you live as long as you laugh, and laugh as long as you live", which is cited on his headstone.

He died in Albuquerque, New Mexico at the age of 70 of a kidney ailment, and is interred in Palm Desert Memorial in Las Vegas, Nevada, in a grave adjoining that of his teammate Chic Johnson.
