= Micky Dolenz Puts You to Sleep =

Studio album by Micky Dolenz
- Released: Fall 1991
- Studio: Sunburst Recording
- Genres: Children's music; lullaby
- Length: 37:57
- Label: Kid Rhino
- Producers: Harold Bronson; Bob Wayne

Micky Dolenz Puts You to Sleep is the debut solo album by the American musician Micky Dolenz. It features covers of various songs as lullabies intended for children, includings songs written by Harry Nilsson and John Lennon. Dolenz dedicated the album to his children: Ami, Charlotte, Emily and Georgia.

== Release and reception ==
Professional ratings
Review scores
Source	Rating
AllMusic	4/5 stars

Micky Dolenz Puts You to Sleep was issued on Kid Rhino in 1991. Jeff Tamarkin summarized in an AllMusic review that the tracks on the album "won't erase the originals from anyone's mind, but they're pleasant enough."

== Track listing ==
No.	Title	Writer(s)	Length
1.	"Pillow Time" (Original version included on The Monkees Present (1969))	Janelle Dolenz Scott; Matt Willis	2:50
2.	"Dream a Little Dream of Me" (Cover based on the Mamas & the Papas version)	Fabian Andre; Wilbur Schwandt	3:26
3.	"Beautiful Boy (Darling Boy)" (John Lennon cover)	Lennon	3:40
4.	"Blackbird" (The Beatles cover)	Lennon–McCartney	2:30
5.	"Lullaby to Tim" (The Hollies cover)	Allan Clarke; Tony Hicks; Graham Nash	3:03
6.	"The Fool on the Hill" (The Beatles cover)	Lennon–McCartney	3:45
7.	"St. Judy's Comet" (Paul Simon cover)	Simon	3:53
8.	"The Moonbeam Song" (Harry Nilsson cover)	Nilsson	3:13
9.	"Remember (Christmas)" (Harry Nilsson cover)	Nilsson	3:17
10.	"Sugar Mountain" (Neil Young cover)	Young	3:20
11.	"Porpoise Song" (Original version included on Head (1968))	Gerry Goffin; Carole King	3:00
Total length:			37:57

Notes

- The CD versions of the album add a cover of "Good Night" by the Beatles.

== Re-releases ==
The album was re-released for Record Store Day 2023 on vinyl for the first time.

== Personnel ==
According to the liner notes of the album:

- Micky Dolenz – vocals
- Zavier – guitar, tiple
- Roger Steinman – keyboards
- John Hatten – bass
- Jimmy Street – saxophone, woodwinds
- Craig Fundyga – vibes
- Gee – accordion

== Charts ==
Chart performance for Micky Dolenz Puts You to Sleep
Chart (2023)	Peak position
US Kid Albums (Billboard)	15
