= The Master (1992 film) =

1992 Hong Kong martial arts film directed by Tsui Hark

- Poster ad for The Master home video

Chinese name
- Traditional Chinese: 黃飛鴻'92之龍行天下
- Simplified Chinese: 黄飞鸿'92之龙行天下
Transcriptions
Standard Mandarin
- Hanyu Pinyin: Huáng Fēihóng '92 Zhī Lóng Xíng Tiānxià
Yue: Cantonese
- Jyutping: Wong4 Fei1hung4 '92 Zi1 Lung4 Hang4 Tin1 Haa6
- Directed by: Tsui Hark
- Screenplay by: Lam Kei-to; Lau Tai-muk
- Story by: Tsui Hark
- Produced by: Tsui Hark
- Starring: Jet Li; Yuen Wah; Crystal Kwok; Jerry Trimble; Anne Rickets
- Cinematography: Henry Chan; Paul A. Edwards
- Edited by: Kam Ma; Marco Mak
- Music by: Tang Siu-lam
- Production companies: Golden Harvest; Wa Nga Films; Film Workshop
- Distributed by: Golden Harvest
- Release dates: 7 May 1992 (South Korea); 28 May 1992 (HK)
- Running time: 92 minutes
- Country: Hong Kong
- Languages: Cantonese; English
- Box office: HK$8,096,542

The Master (Chinese: 黃飛鴻'92之龍行天下; lit. 'Wong Fei-hung '92: The Dragon's Journey') is a 1992 Hong Kong martial arts action film written, produced and directed by Tsui Hark. It stars Jet Li, Yuen Wah, Crystal Kwok and Jerry Trimble.

== Plot ==
Chan Hou-tak, a Chinese traditional medicine practitioner and martial artist living in Los Angeles, is attacked by thugs led by a local dojo owner named Johnny, who destroy his store. Johnny is prevented from killing Tak when a woman named Anna comes to save him. During his recovery he stays in Anna's camper van. Anna is both a janitor and a student from a gymnastics school but was banned from competing and attending for physically attacking a classmate. As a result, Anna ends up being fired by her coach, who is already fed up with Anna's bad behaviour.

Jet arrives from Hong Kong on the airport bus. When he arrives at Tak's store to resume as Tak's Kung Fu student, he finds the store shuttered and three thieves steal his bag. He chases their car on foot through the streets and eventually catches them. The thieves are so impressed with Jet's physical skills they beg him to be their master. They take Jet to their home (an abandoned municipal building) but they're attacked by a larger gang. Jet reluctantly steps in to defend his new friends, but their home is set on fire.

Johnny and his gang are closing down kung fu schools and making a name for themselves. Jet meets May, a bank worker responsible for the loan on Tak's store - but neither knows where Master Tak is. Jet finds himself in the middle of a robbery at a carpark. He finds himself fighting beside Johnny, but Johnny recognizes him from one of Tak's pictures and makes it clear he intends to kill both Jet and Tak. Anna and Jet's friends get beaten up, so Jet trains his friends to defend themselves. Jet is eventually re-united with Tak, but Tak claims he's no longer interested in either teaching Kung Fu or doing herbal medicine.

Jet and his friends go to Tak's store and prepare to deal with Johnny's gang. The three friends put their newfound skills into practice fighting four members of Johnny's gang. Jet and Johnny fight outside the store until the police step in.

Jet and Tak argue, and Jet decides to return to Hong Kong. On the airport bus he's attacked by two dreadlocked men armed with a shotgun who was at the carpark. Jet manages to defeat the men and regain control of the bus despite a shotgun blast killing the driver. May has been following the bus in her car, possibly intending to express romantic interest in Jet. In the meantime, Tak and the three friends make their way to a rooftop where Johnny and his gang are holding Anna hostage.

Jet and May go to Tak's store to find a note and a will. They quickly make their way to the rooftop of a tall building where Tak has disabled 15 or 20 of Johnny's men but is beginning to tire due to his age. Jet takes over for his master and fights Johnny while Tak and the friends defeat the rest of the gang and rescue Anna. After an intense fight Jet manages to kick Johnny off a hanging wire to his death.

Anna goes on her trip with the gymnastics class for the competition, implying her ban was lifted. Jet boards the airport bus, once again intending to go to Hong Kong. To his surprise he finds May there as well; planning to go to with him for a holiday, but the three friends and Master Tak drive up beside the bus: Master Tak has stolen Jet's passport so he can't leave. Jet and the others laugh at May's misfortune of traveling alone but she in anger and frustration shoves her ticket in Jet's mouth as the credits roll.

== Cast ==
- Jet Li as Jet
- Yuen Wah as Chan Hou-tak
- Crystal Kwok as May
- Jerry Trimble as Johnny
- Anne Rickets as Anna
- Rueben Gonzáles as Cito
- Guy Fadollone as Ruben
- Derek Annunciation as Mouse
- Michael Burke as Oscar
- Camille Carrigan as Jeannie
- Wayne Post as Jimmy
- George Cheung as Paul Lee
- Pamela J. Anderson as Gymnastics Coach
- Steven Ho as Remy
- Stefanos Miltsakakis as Jerry
- Yuen Gam-fai as Fei
- Cheung Wing-cheung as Tiger
- To Wai-wo as Martial Arts Teacher
- Cheung Ching as Clerk
- Glen Chin as Taxi Driver
- Billy Blanks as Thug (uncredited)

== Production ==
The Master was shot on-location in Los Angeles, California, a rarity for a Hong Kong production to be shot entirely in the United States. Yuen Wah and Brandy Yuen were the film's action choreographers.

The film's main theme, "Through the ebb and flow of the tide, I'll be there for you", was written by Chou Chih-hua and sung by Jackie Chan.

== Release ==
The film was filmed in 1990, but it was shelved for two years, when the success of Once Upon a Time in China made Li a major action star.

The original Chinese working title of the film was Lóng Xíng Tiānxià (Chinese: 龍行天下; lit. 'Dragon Travels the World'), however it was retitled to better link it to the Once Upon a Time in China films, in which Li played Wong Fei-hung.

=== Home media ===
On 28 March 2005, DVD was released by Hong Kong Legends in the United Kingdom in Region 2. Four months later, The Jet Li Collection DVD was released on 25 July 2005 at 2 disc set including Hitman.

== Reception ==
=== Box office ===
The Master earned a weak HK$8,096,542 in Hong Kong.

=== Critical response ===
Upon initial release, The Master was not particularly successful. In his audio commentary for the Hong Kong Legends DVD release, Bey Logan gives possible explanations why, citing characters' ridiculous behaviour and contrived situations. He explains that the characters' motivations are unclear - there is no clear reason why Johnny and his gang repeatedly go to Uncle Tak's store to intimidate him, and close down other kung fu schools. Also, if the bus driver is shot by the dreadlocked man with a shotgun, why does the bus keep moving while the action is still going? Lastly, the Hong Kong film crew doesn't have the same luxury as the American film crew which led to certain scenes that didn't work too well.

Despite the flawed plot, the film did give signs of what was to come from Jet Li's appearances in films with modern settings. Li's action style in The Master was an early example of what was to come in his Hollywood films Romeo Must Die and Cradle 2 the Grave.

== Alternate version ==
Miramax's North American version of The Master, which was distributed on home video and DVD, was dubbed in English (including dialogue that was already recorded in English), and the dubbing often strayed heavily from the original dialogue. Jet Li is dubbed by Michael McConnohie.

Four minutes of cuts were made, including:

- The opening scene, in which Anna fights a gymnastics student.
- A scene of Anna being banned from gymnastics school.
- A scene of Jet walking through Los Angeles is cut slightly. Also, acoustic guitar music replaces the original, more somber score, changing the intentions of the scene significantly.
- A scene in which Jet, after the clinic is raided, finds Anna beaten up.
