= Wonder Wheels =

Television series

- Genre: Superhero
- Directed by: Charles A. Nichols; Chris Cuddington
- Voices of: Micky Dolenz; Don Messick; Susan Davis
- Theme music composer: Hoyt Curtin
- Country of origin: United States
- Original language: English
- No. of series: 1
- No. of episodes: 16

Production
- Executive producers: William Hanna; Joseph Barbera
- Producer: Terry Morse Jr.
- Running time: 5 minutes
- Production company: Hanna-Barbera Productions

Original release
- Network: CBS
- Release: September 10, 1977 – January 21, 1978

Related
- The Skatebirds

Wonder Wheels is a Saturday morning animated series produced by Hanna-Barbera Productions that originally aired as a 5-minute segment on The Skatebirds from September 10, 1977, to January 21, 1978, on CBS.

In the fall of 1979, Wonder Wheels continued to air on The Skatebirds when the show returned to CBS in a shortened half-hour version on Sunday mornings until January 25, 1981. In the late 1980s, it resurfaced in a different syndicated half-hour version of The Skatebirds on USA Cartoon Express and later on Cartoon Network, Boomerang and as an interstitial segment between shows.

== Plot ==
A 17-year-old high school journalist named Willie Wheeler (voiced by Micky Dolenz of The Monkees) and his girlfriend Dooley Lawrence (voiced by Susan Davis) solve crimes with the help of his superhero motorcycle Wonder Wheels (vocal effects provided by Don Messick). Whenever Willie goes into action, he utters his catchphrase: "This looks like a job for Won-won-won-won-won-won-won-won-won-won-won-won-wonder Wheels!" and at the press of a button, Willie's beat-up motorcycle transforms into a flashy version with a mind of its own.

== Cast ==
- Micky Dolenz as Willie Wheeler
- Susan Davis as Dooley Lawrence
- Don Messick as Wonder Wheels (Vocal Effects)

== Episodes ==
No.	Title	Original release date
1	"Wonder Wheels in The County Fair"	September 10, 1977
Willie and Dooley witness two crooks stealing money from the county fair during a motocross race.
2	"Wonder Wheels and The Rustlers"	September 17, 1977
A rancher reports 10,000 cattle were stolen; Willie and Dooley discover the cattle are being stolen by men in helicopters.
3	"Wonder Wheels and The Skyscraper"	September 24, 1977
Wonder Wheels pursues two escaped convicts who have taken refuge in a skyscraper under construction.
4	"Wonder Wheels and The Gold Train Robbery"	October 1, 1977
A train carrying a million dollars in gold is robbed by two crooks and Wonder Wheels is hot on their trail.
5	"Wonder Wheels and The Snowmen"	October 8, 1977
A valuable crown for the Snow Queen Contest at a ski resort is stolen by crooks who try to escape in a snowmobile.
6	"Wonder Wheels and The Vanishing Prince"	October 15, 1977
Prince Raji is kidnapped by criminals on a boat; Wonder Wheels saves the day and the Prince awards him with a medal.
7	"Wonder Wheels and The Ghost Town"	October 22, 1977
Willie and Dooley visit a ghost town for a newspaper story and meet the old Pecos Kid ghost who tries to scare them away.
8	"Wonder Wheels and His Double Trouble"	October 29, 1977
At a pie baking contest, Willie and Dooley witness a fake Wonder Wheels robbing a bank and a jewelry store.
9	"Wonder Wheels and The U.F.O."	November 5, 1977
Two aliens (Starnak and Orbito) pursue Willie in a plan to capture him as a typical human specimen for their investigation.
10	"Wonder Wheels and The Hermits' Horde"	November 12, 1977
Wonder Wheels pursues the hermit of Haunted Mountain who has committed a bank robbery.
11	"Wonder Wheels and The Air Race"	November 19, 1977
A plane loses a wheel during take-off at the Pleasantville to Harristown Air Race and it's up to Wonder Wheels to save the day.
12	"Wonder Wheels and The Animals"	November 26, 1977
Willie and Wonder Wheels investigate a nearby zoo where a gorilla and other animals are escaping.
13	"Wonder Wheels and The Idol's Eye"	December 3, 1977
A couple of crooks use a mummy disguise to scare off an archaeologist so they can steal the Emerald Eye.
14	"Wonder Wheels and The Race Horse"	December 10, 1977
Wonder Wheels pursues a thief who has stolen Gray Ghost, the fastest race horse in the world.
15	"Wonder Wheels and The Studio Steal"	December 17, 1977
While visiting a movie studio, two suspicious characters steal an armored car with Willie and Wonder Wheels in hot pursuit.
16	"Wonder Wheels and The Golden Globe"	December 24, 1977
Wonder Wheels chases two thieves who have stolen a million dollar solid gold model of the Solar System.
