= Good Luck, Mr. Yates =

1943 film by Ray Enright

- Theatrical release poster
- Directed by: Ray Enright
- Screenplay by: Lou Breslow; Adele Comandini
- Story by: Harold Jacob Smith; Sam Rudd
- Produced by: David Chatkin
- Starring: Claire Trevor; Jess Barker; Edgar Buchanan; Tom Neal; Albert Bassermann; Henry Armetta
- Cinematography: Philip Tannura
- Edited by: Richard Fantl
- Music by: John Leipold
- Production company: Columbia Pictures
- Distributed by: Columbia Pictures
- Release date: June 29, 1943
- Running time: 70 minutes
- Country: United States
- Language: English

Good Luck, Mr. Yates is a 1943 American drama film directed by Ray Enright and written by Lou Breslow and Adele Comandini. The film stars Claire Trevor, Jess Barker, Edgar Buchanan, Tom Neal, Albert Bassermann and Henry Armetta. The film was released on June 29, 1943, by Columbia Pictures.

== Cast ==
- Claire Trevor as Ruth Jones
- Jess Barker as Oliver Yates
- Edgar Buchanan as Jonesey Jones
- Tom Neal as Charlie Edmonds
- Albert Bassermann as Dr. Carl Hesser
- Henry Armetta as Mike Zaloris
- Scotty Beckett as Jimmy Dixon
- Tommy Cook as Johnny Zaloris
- Frank Sully as Joe Briggs
- Douglas Leavitt as Monty King
- Rosina Galli as Katy Zaloris
- William Roy as Plunkett
- Conrad Binyon as Rob Coles
- Bobby Larson as Ross
- Rudy Wissler as Wilson
