= The Skatebirds =

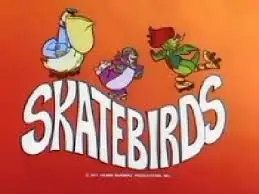
- Directed by: Sidney Miller; Hollingsworth Morse; Charles A. Nichols; Chris Cuddington
- Voices of: Scatman Crothers; Bob Holt; Don Messick; Lennie Weinrib
- Theme music composer: Hoyt Curtin
- Country of origin: United States
- Original language: English
- No. of seasons: 1
- No. of episodes: 16

Production
- Executive producers: William Hanna; Joseph Barbera
- Producers: Terry Morse, Jr.
- Running time: 60 minutes (1977–78); 30 minutes (1979–81)
- Production company: Hanna-Barbera Productions

Original release
- Network: CBS
- Release: September 10, 1977 – January 21, 1978

The Skatebirds (onscreen title: Skatebirds) is an American live action/animated package program produced by Hanna-Barbera Productions and broadcast on CBS from September 10, 1977, to January 21, 1978. It has many similarities to The Banana Splits.

== Overview ==
The Skatebirds consisted of three large costumed birds on roller skates: Knock-Knock, a woodpecker (performed by Bruce Hoy, voiced by Lennie Weinrib); Satchel, a pelican (performed by Ken Means, voiced by Bob Holt) and Scooter, a penguin (performed by Joe Giamalva, voiced by Don Messick). Their nemesis was a cat named Scat Cat (performed by Maurice Cooke, voiced by Scatman Crothers).

The live-action sequences featuring The Skatebirds mostly revolved around the nasty Scat Cat perpetually chasing the roller-skating trio and trying to get the best of them. Unlike the Banana Splits live-action segments, the Skatebirds were filmed in a variety of theme-park locations, rather than running around in a single studio.

The show was divided into four short segments introduced by live action wraparounds with The Skatebirds characters which included three animated segments (The Robonic Stooges, Wonder Wheels and Woofer & Wimper, Dog Detectives) and a 10-minute live-action segment (Mystery Island). The appearance of the characters and the show's format was similar to The Banana Splits. Unlike its similar predecessor and most Saturday morning children's shows produced in the 1970s, The Skatebirds did not contain a laugh track.

A total of 16 episodes of The Skatebirds were produced in its original run from September 10, 1977, to January 21, 1978. In the fall of 1979, the show returned to CBS in a shortened half-hour version with Wonder Wheels and Mystery Island segments (The Robonic Stooges and Woofer & Whimper, Dog Detectives segments had been spun off into a separate half-hour) and broadcast on Sunday mornings from September 9, 1979, until January 25, 1981. In the late 1980s, a different syndicated half-hour version of The Skatebirds with The Robonic Stooges and Wonder Wheels segments was shown on USA Cartoon Express and later resurfaced on Cartoon Network in the 1990s and Boomerang in the 2000s.

== Opening and closing credits ==
The opening credits for the original one-hour version with voice-over narration by the show's recording director Wally Burr:

It's Skatebird time and here come The Skatebirds –SKATEBIRDS (C) 1977 HANNA BARBERA PRODUCTIONS INC.- Knock-Knock, Scooter, Satchel and Scat Cat. Then, The Robonic Stooges, plus the spine-tingling suspense-filled excitement of Mystery Island, and the doggone it daffy doings of those dog detectives, Woofer & Whimper, and more...the unbelievable adventures of an unbelievable motorcycle, Wonder Wheels. For all-out fun, it's Satch, Knock-Knock, Scooter and Scat Cat...and for suspense, mystery and adventure, it's The Skatebirds Show!

The opening credits for the half-hour version with voice-over narration by Ronnie Schell:

It's Skatebird time starring Knock-Knock, Satchel and Scooter, those featheared clowns of fantasy. Along with Willie the Wheeler and the superhero cycle known as Wonder Wheels, as well as those three mechanical marbles, The Robonic Stooges. One big collection of wild, wacky and wonderful characters...The Skatebirds!

The music featured in the closing credits is the CB Bears theme which was also later used as the ending credits for Captain Caveman and the Teen Angels.

== Segments ==
=== The Robonic Stooges ===
The characters of The Three Stooges – Moe (voiced by Paul Winchell), Larry (voiced by Joe Baker) and Curly (voiced by Frank Welker) – as clumsy crime-fighting bionic superheroes who are given assignments via film projector from their boss Agent 000 (voiced by Ross Martin) who runs the Superhero Employment Agency.

=== Wonder Wheels ===
A high school journalist named Willie Wheeler (voiced by Micky Dolenz) and his girlfriend Dooley (voiced by Susan Davis) solve crimes with the help of his shape-shifting superhero motorcycle Wonder Wheels (vocal effects provided by Don Messick). Whenever Willie goes into action, his beat-up motorcycle transforms itself into a flashy version with a mind of its own.

=== Woofer & Wimper, Dog Detectives ===
A shortened and re-titled version of Clue Club featuring two talking bloodhounds – Woofer & Wimper (voiced by Paul Winchell and Jim MacGeorge) – who help solve mysteries with the Clue Club detectives: Larry (voiced by David Jolliffe), Pepper (voiced by Patricia Stitch), D.D. (voiced by Bob Hastings), and Dottie (voiced by Tara Talboy) which usually ends with the bad guys arrested by Sheriff Bagley (voiced by John Stephenson). The original half-hour episodes of Clue Club were cut-down to 10 minutes to showcase both dogs as the show's main characters.

=== Mystery Island ===
The adventures of a plane crew consisting of pilot Chuck Kelly (portrayed by Stephen Parr), computer expert Sue Corwin (portrayed by Lynn Marie Johnston), her younger brother Sandy (portrayed by Larry Volk), and their robot named P.O.P.S. (voiced by Frank Welker) who stranded on a remote island by the evil scientist Dr. Strange (portrayed by Michael Kermoyan) after he used a tractor beam to bring their airplane down onto Mystery Island. Dr. Strange hopes to capture P.O.P.S. and use it in his quest for world domination.

== Broadcast history ==
Original CBS broadcast:

- CBS Saturday Morning: September 10, 1977 – January 21, 1978
- CBS Sunday Morning: September 9, 1979 – August 31, 1980 (rebroadcast)
- CBS Sunday Morning: September 7, 1980 – January 25, 1981 (rebroadcast)

Broadcast schedules (all EDT):

- September 10, 1977 – November 12, 1977, CBS Saturday 9:30-10:30 AM
- November 19, 1977 – January 21, 1978, CBS Saturday 8:00-9:00 AM
- September 9, 1979 – March 1980, CBS Sunday 7:30-8:00 AM
- March 1980 – August 31, 1980, CBS Sunday 7:00-7:30 AM
- September 7, 1980 – January 25, 1981, CBS Sunday 8:00-8:30 AM

== Skatebirds cast ==
Character	Costumed actor	Voice actor
Scat Cat (cat)	Maurice Cooke	Scatman Crothers
Knock-Knock (woodpecker)	Bruce Hoyt	Lennie Weinrib
Satchel (pelican)	Ken Means	Bob Holt
Scooter (penguin)	Joe Giamalva	Don Messick
Tree	N/A	Bob Holt
Shelly (bird)	Unknown Actor	Don Messick

== Other appearances ==
- The Skatebirds made a special guest appearance at a celebrity roast honoring Fred Flintstone in the TV special Hanna-Barbera's All-Star Comedy Ice Revue (1978).

== Merchandise ==
- A board game based on The Skatebirds was released by Milton Bradley in 1978. It was a 2–3 player game suited for children between 7–12 years of age. The board also featured the characters of Woofer and Wimper (with the Clue Club teenagers and Sheriff Bagley) and The Robonic Stooges. The game's premise was The Skatebirds are trying to organize their TV show and Scat Cat does all he can to foul up their plans: he has built a marble slide at the Treehouse and does his best to stop The Skatebirds. The first player to reach the Skatebirds' Treehouse Studio wins the game.
- A coloring book, Skatebirds Present The Robonic Stooges, was released by Rand McNally in 1978.
