= Girl on the Spot =

1946 film by William Beaudine

- Directed by: William Beaudine
- Written by: George Blake; Jack Hartfield; Dorcas Cochran; Jerry Warner; Stanley Davis
- Produced by: George Blake; Milton Schwarzwald
- Starring: Lois Collier; Jess Barker; George Dolenz
- Cinematography: Maury Gertsman
- Edited by: Saul A. Goodkind
- Music by: Paul Sawtell
- Production company: Universal Pictures
- Distributed by: Universal Pictures
- Release date: January 11, 1946
- Running time: 75 minutes
- Country: United States
- Language: English

Girl on the Spot is a 1946 American musical crime film directed by William Beaudine and starring Lois Collier, Jess Barker and George Dolenz.

== Cast ==
- Lois Collier as Kathy Lorenz
- Jess Barker as Rick Crane
- George Dolenz as Leon Lorenz
- Fuzzy Knight as Bim
- Ludwig Stössel as 'Popsy' Lorenz
- Richard Lane as 'Weepy' McGurk
- Donald MacBride as Inspector Gleason
- Edward Brophy as Fingers Foley
- Ray Walker as Don Dawson
- Carol Hughes as Susie 'Cuddles' LaPlanche (uncredited)

== Bibliography ==
- Elizabeth Leese. Costume Design in the Movies: An Illustrated Guide to the Work of 157 Great Designers. Courier Corporation, 2012.
