= Mystery Island =

- Directed by: Hollingsworth Morse
- Starring: Stephen Parr; Lynn Marie Johnston; Larry Volk; Michael Kermoyan
- Voices of: Frank Welker
- Country of origin: United States
- Original language: English
- No. of episodes: 16

Production
- Executive producers: Joseph Barbera; William Hanna
- Producer: Terry Morse, Jr.
- Running time: 10 minutes (per episode)
- Production company: Hanna-Barbera Productions

Original release
- Network: CBS
- Release: September 10, 1977 – January 21, 1978

Related
- The Skatebirds; Danger Island

Mystery Island is a live-action science fiction adventure television series produced by Hanna-Barbera Productions that originally aired as a segment on The Skatebirds from September 10, 1977, to January 21, 1978, on CBS.

In the fall of 1979, Mystery Island continued to air on The Skatebirds when the show returned to CBS in a shortened half-hour version on Sunday mornings until January 25, 1981. In September 2005, episodes resurfaced on Boomerang and were rebroadcast as part of Captain Caveman and the Teen Angels.

== Summary ==
The series follows the adventures of three young people: Chuck Kelly (Stephen Parr), a pilot; Sue Corwin (Lynn Marie Johnston), a computer expert; her younger brother Sandy (Larry Volk) and their computer robot called P.O.P.S. (voiced by Frank Welker). The trio become stranded on a remote island after the evil mad scientist Dr. Strange (Michael Kermoyan) uses his projector beam ray to crash their plane. Dr. Strange hopes to capture P.O.P.S. and use it in his quest for world domination.

Mystery Island was very similar in scope to Sid and Marty Krofft's 1976 live-action series Dr. Shrinker (from The Krofft Supershow) which also saw a trio of humans on a plane brought down to the island of a different mad scientist. A total of sixteen episodes of Mystery Island were produced, each running ten minutes and included a cliffhanger that was resolved in the next installment.

== Characters ==
=== Main characters ===
- Chuck Kelly (portrayed by Stephen Parr) - A dedicated young pilot stranded on Mystery Island with Sue and Sandy Corwin and their robot P.O.P.S. He is determined to get the group safely back to civilization, and though sometimes prone to rash decisions, often sticks his neck out for the others.
- Sue Corwin (portrayed by Lynn Marie Johnston) - A pretty and feisty young computer expert whose scientist father created the robot P.O.P.S. Though she is skeptical about P.O.P.S.' claims of having feelings, she does care for the robot's well-being, as well as for her brother and Chuck.
- Sandy Corwin (portrayed by Larry Volk) - Her likeable adolescent brother. Though he frequently argues with his sister, the two care for each other. He looks up to Chuck, and has a good rapport with P.O.P.S., often defending the robot's claims to feeling emotions. He is also an accomplished high school gymnast.
- P.O.P.S. (voiced by Frank Welker) - The robot whose vast intelligence and ability to speak many languages has made him the target of Dr. Strange. He is similar to C-3PO in that both function as comic relief, and have a prim and fussy British butler type of personality, and a tendency to fret whenever a dangerous situation arises. He claims to be capable of feelings. The P.O.P.S. prop costume was a re-use of the original Robot B-9 from the 1960s television series Lost in Space, modified with a bubble on its shoulders, a cylindrical (rather than bubble) head, a blue-and-white paint job, and other minor changes (P.O.P.S. image.). It has since been restored to its original Robot B-9 appearance.

=== Villains ===
- Dr. Strange (portrayed by Michael Kermoyan) - The principal villain of the series. He is a mad scientist obsessed with obtaining P.O.P.S. and using his vast knowledge to give him world domination. Doctor Strange's full real name, if he even had one, was never revealed throughout the series' run. He should not be confused with the Marvel Comics superhero of the same name.
  - Krieg (portrayed by Henry Corden) - Dr. Strange's nasty but inept chief henchman. He wants very much to impress his boss but usually falls short.
  - Sly (actor unknown) - A bald-headed oaf who is unofficially Krieg's second-in-command and somewhat smarter, usually the first to question his superior's dubious decisions.
  - Crunch (actor unknown) - Another of Dr. Strange's thuggish henchmen, and their unofficial clown. He's usually the first to be "volunteered" whenever Dr. Strange needs a human "guinea-pig" to test a new weapon on.
  - The Parrot - Dr. Strange's pet which appears occasionally. It seems to be the one thing Dr. Strange shows any affection for, similar to Ernst Stavro Blofeld with his cat.

There are at least two other henchmen, but they are never named and never speak, and are played by two sets of actors who switch from episode to episode.

=== Other characters ===
- The Mud People - The mud-covered island natives who pursue P.O.P.S., believing the robot to be a god. They speak in some kind of primitive language that only P.O.P.S. and Titan can understand and translate.
- The Bird Men - A race of humanoid birds from the planet Falconia who were transported to Mystery Island by Dr. Strange prior to the beginning of the series.
  - Wark (actor unknown) - A Bird Man who can speak in English. He is determined to turn Sue Corwin into a bird-woman to serve his people as their new princess and oracle.
- The Lava Man (actor unknown) - A huge, hulking creature made of lava who befriends the Corwins and Chuck after they save his life. He communicates mainly in grunting and a kind of gibberish which only P.O.P.S. can translate. The Lava Man has a bit of a crush on Sue.
- The Ape Men - A race of super-intelligent apes that are the result of an experiment in evolution by Dr. Strange to whom they are very loyal as they wish him to advance them into human beings. The Ape Men are shown to be afraid of the Mud People.
  - Korba - The leader of the Ape Men.
- Titan (voice actor unknown) - A massive computer with artificial intelligence who considers all humans inferior, except possibly its creator Dr. Strange.

== Episodes ==
No.	Title	Original release date
1	"A Matter of Gravity"	September 10, 1977
Chuck, Sue and Sandy's plane has been forced down on Mystery Island by the evil Dr. Strange, who needs their robot P.O.P.S. to complete his plan for world domination. After a frightening encounter with the mysterious Mud People, P.O.P.S. activates his force field to protect the group, but not in time to prevent Krieg and his henchmen from targeting Chuck with Dr. Strange's Gravity Ray gun.
2	"The Mind Blower"	September 17, 1977
After successfully repelling Krieg and his men using P.O.P.S.'s force field, Sandy finds Chuck immobilized by the Gravity Ray gun with a tiger about to attack him. After P.O.P.S. uses his gift of animal mimicry to send the tiger away, he frees Chuck by again using his force field. Immediately afterwards, they realize that Sue is missing – she has been captured and taken to Dr. Strange's cave, where she is fighting an intense battle of wills with the mad scientist's Mind Interrogator machine.
3	"Just Whistle for an Answer"	September 24, 1977
As Sue struggles to keep from revealing the secret of P.O.P.S.'s circuitry, Chuck and Sandy anxiously search for her. While scouting ahead, Sandy falls into a trap set by the Mud People, but Chuck and P.O.P.S. come to his rescue. Chuck and Sandy afterwards find the hidden cave, sneak past the henchmen, outwit Dr. Strange and escape with Sue – but then discover that P.O.P.S. is gone!
4	"Sue's Courage"	October 1, 1977
Chuck, Sue and Sandy follow Krieg and his men to the Valley of Fire, having overheard Dr. Strange order them to go there to track down their robot, taken by the Mud People in their mistaken belief he is a god. The trio get distracted by the Lava Man, a giant living creature miraculously formed from molten rock, trapped under a boulder from which they free him at Sue's insistence. The Lava Man appears to be grateful especially to Sue and he moves on. Afterwards, the trio catch up to P.O.P.S. who has been abandoned by the Mud People in the Valley, only to be endangered by a huge volcanic explosion.
5	"Valley of Fire"	October 8, 1977
P.O.P.S. is rescued by the unlikely trio of Chuck, Krieg and the leader of the Mud People following another huge explosion in the Valley of Fire while Krieg's men guide Sue and Sandy to safer ground. After everyone is safely out of the Valley, the Lava Man frightens off Krieg and his thugs to repay P.O.P.S.' human friends for saving his life earlier. Once he leaves again, the Mud People return to reclaim P.O.P.S. as their "god".
6	"Sentinels of Time"	October 15, 1977
Chuck, Sue, Sandy and P.O.P.S. are brought by the Mud People into their cave where they encounter the Sentinels of Time – small, white glowing firefly-like creatures which can freeze people in time. Chuck and Sandy are suspended in time by the Sentinels who then chase Sue deeper into the cave, where she succeeds in repelling them upon discovering they can't stand her anti-deodorant spray. Her triumph is short-lived when she finds Chuck and Sandy have been unfrozen only to have the Mudmen expose them all to a mysterious mist putting them to sleep, not to awake for ten centuries, and P.O.P.S. is unable to help them, his battery running down from no access to solar power.
7	"Who's Whom Here?"	October 22, 1977
Dr. Strange discovers what has happened to P.O.P.S. and his friends. Through one of his inventions, he tries to transport them out of their bodies to his cave. The process fails due to a sudden short circuit, but the exposure to solar energy rejuvenates P.O.P.S., enabling him to free Chuck, Sue, and Sandy from their sleep spell just in time for them to save him from being crushed by falling rocks. However, the whole process has some side effects, including the accidental transportation of mysterious beings from another dimension over to the island and as the trio and their robot escape the cave, Chuck somehow undergoing a body switch with Krieg.
8	"Fate's Just a Dirty Trick"	October 29, 1977
In Chuck's body, Krieg finally captures P.O.P.S. But with another short circuit, Chuck again becomes himself and then flees with the robot along with former captives Sue and Sandy on a raft, unaware they are heading for a waterfall.
9	"Golden Birds of Prey"	November 5, 1977
When they realize their peril, Chuck, Sue and Sandy desperately try to save themselves from the waterfall as well as prevent water from seeping into P.O.P.S.'s circuits. Sue rewires the Gravity Ray Gun which they appropriated earlier, using it to push the raft toward shore. But immediately after they are out of danger, Sue suddenly vanishes – captured by a giant Bird Man.
10	"Visitors from Falconia"	November 12, 1977
Trapped in Black Cavern deep beneath Mystery Island, Sue is being slowly transformed into a Bird Woman to be both princess and oracle for the Bird Men of Falconia, the aliens Dr. Strange accidentally transported to the island earlier. Meanwhile, Chuck separates from Sandy and P.O.P.S. during their search for Sue, leading to the latter two getting recaptured by Krieg and his men who bring them to Dr. Strange's cave. As Dr. Strange subjects P.O.P.S. to his own computer Titan, the energy process interrupts the Bird People's transformation of Sue. This leads the Bird Men to invade Dr. Strange's cave, turning off all power on Titan and placing everyone under their spell except for Chuck, who is outside the cave trying to find a way in.
11	"The Duel"	November 19, 1977
Guided by messages from P.O.P.S, Chuck enters the secret cavern and challenges Wark, the leader of the Bird Men, to a duel of minds for the freedom and lives of himself and the others. Under P.O.P.S.'s guidance, Chuck wins and in grudging admiration, Wark frees everyone and goes with his people to seek for their oracle elsewhere. Once again surrounded by the thugs, Sue implores Dr. Strange, who does owe Chuck, to allow the group a 10-minute start to freedom; but he reneges upon discovering they are heading for the Kingdom of the Beasts.
12	"Kingdom of the Beasts"	November 26, 1977
Ignoring Dr. Strange's warning, the friends enter the Kingdom of the Beasts where Sandy, while scouting ahead, again falls into trouble, this time a bed of quicksand from which he is rescued by Sue while Chuck and P.O.P.S. use the robot's force field to repel yet another attack by Krieg and his men. The group soon discover a helicopter hidden by Dr. Strange in the jungle. Before they can get into it, they are attacked by a lion.
13	"P.O.P.S. in a Box"	December 3, 1977
After repelling the lion attack with the help of P.O.P.'s gift of animal mimicry, the trio decide to transfer the robot's computer brain from his body into a box as they are unable to load him into the helicopter. They barely manage to escape recapture by Krieg and his men before taking off in the helicopter to — they hope — their freedom.
14	"Island of the Apes"	December 10, 1977
Dr. Strange sends a projector beam ray forcing the helicopter down, but Chuck manages to land it safely. Shortly afterwards however, the box with P.O.P.S.'s computer mind is stolen by a group of super-intelligent apes bred by Dr. Strange called the Ape Men. They are led by the most intelligent of them named Korba. The Ape Men don't get far though before they encounter the Mud People who frighten them into dropping the box which is then retrieved by Chuck, Sue and Sandy. Although they successfully reunite P.O.P.S. with his body, they are all still in danger.
15	"The Skull's the Clue"	December 17, 1977
The group seeks temporary shelter in a tree house unaware that Dr. Strange has it under surveillance and soon find themselves besieged by the Ape Men. Upon learning from P.O.P.S. that the Ape Men are afraid of the Mud People, Chuck and Sue disguise Sandy as a Mud Man, frightening their attackers away. But then they find their refuge is apparently caught in an earthquake courtesy of Dr. Strange. Then a ghostly voice orders them to leave.
16	"Home Run"	December 24, 1977
Confronted by the angry ghost of a pirate ordering the group to leave, Sue tries to attack it believing it to be a fake, but it disappears leading her to find a map that seems to indicate the location of a boat at the other end of the island. Led by the map, they race into a tunnel and then into a trap transporting them back to Dr. Strange's cave. Unexpectedly however, they turn the tables by overpowering the mad scientist and subjecting him to his own Mind Interrogator to learn the way to the boat. Running from Krieg, his henchmen, the Mud People, the Ape Men, and all of Dr. Strange's superpowers, they reach the boat and – hopefully – freedom at last!
