= Idea Girl =

1946 film

- Theatrical release poster
- Directed by: Will Jason
- Screenplay by: Charles R. Marion; Elwood Ullman
- Story by: Gladys Shelley
- Produced by: Will Cowan
- Starring: Jess Barker; Julie Bishop; Alan Mowbray; George Dolenz; Joan Shawlee; Laura Deane Dutton
- Cinematography: George Robinson
- Edited by: Otto Ludwig
- Production company: Universal Pictures
- Distributed by: Universal Pictures
- Release date: February 8, 1946
- Running time: 60 minutes
- Country: United States
- Language: English

Idea Girl is a 1946 American comedy film directed by Will Jason and written by Charles R. Marion and Elwood Ullman. The film stars Jess Barker, Julie Bishop, Alan Mowbray, George Dolenz, Joan Shawlee and Laura Deane Dutton. The film was released on February 8, 1946, by Universal Pictures.

== Cast ==
- Jess Barker as Larry Brewster
- Julie Bishop as Pat O'Rourke
- Alan Mowbray as J.C. Crow
- George Dolenz as Wilfred Potts
- Joan Shawlee as Mabel
- Laura Deane Dutton as Cynthia Winters
- Arthur Q. Bryan as P.J. Maple
- Sarah Padden as Old lady
- Ruth Lee as Abigail Hawthorne
- Virginia Christine as Evelina
- Maurice Cass as Arturo Coveleski
- Barton Yarborough as Pete Barlow
- Charlie Barnet as Orchestra Leader
