= The Secret Files of the Spy Dogs =

American animated series

- Dutch DVD cover
- Genre: Adventure; Mystery; Comedy; Speculative fiction Spy-fi
- Created by: Jim Benton
- Based on: SpyDogs by Jim Benton
- Directed by: Will Meugniot
- Starring: Micky Dolenz; Adam West
- Voices of: Mary Kay Bergman; Jim Cummings; Michael Donovan; Jess Harnell; Charity James; Maurice LaMarche; Tress MacNeille; Jim Ward; Billy West
- Narrated by: Don LaFontaine (Opening Narration)
- Theme music composer: Jeremy Sweet
- Composers: Dori Amarilio; Glenn Scott Lacey
- Country of origin: United States
- No. of seasons: 2
- No. of episodes: 22

Production
- Executive producers: Eric S. Rollman; Jim Benton; Michael Hack; Dan Kletzky
- Producers: Will Meugniot; Michael Hack
- Editor: Katina Zinner
- Running time: 20 minutes
- Production company: Saban Entertainment

Original release
- Network: Fox Kids
- Release: September 12, 1998 – 1999

The Secret Files of the Spy Dogs is an American children's animated series, produced by Saban Entertainment, that aired on Fox Kids from 1998 to 1999.

Ownership of the series passed to Disney in 2001 when Disney acquired Fox Kids Worldwide, which also includes Saban Entertainment.

== Plot ==
The Spy Dogs are a secret organization of dogs that are dedicated to protecting their world, without letting their masters know about their activities. They battle a variety of enemies, including Baron Bone, Catastrophe, Ernst Stavro Blowfish, fleas and aliens.

== Characters ==
All anthropomorphic animals are intelligent enough to walk on two legs and talk. The first season of The Secret Files of the Spy Dogs used traditional cel animation, but the second season used the digital ink and paint process.

=== Main operatives ===
- Dog Zero (voiced by Adam West) – A dog of an unknown breed; who is the leader of the Spy Dogs. Although he is never seen, Dog Zero appears to be a bloodhound.
- Ralph (voiced by Micky Dolenz) – A dog from the United States who is a high-ranking Spy Dog. Ralph is the leader of the group. He is very sensible and cares about other individuals' feelings. Ralph appears to be a Labrador Retriever/Dalmatian mix. He has a brother named Mange who is a Chesapeake Bay Retriever.
- Mitzy (voiced by Mary Kay Bergman) – A pink terrier from America; who is a high-ranking Spy Dog. She is very skilled in martial arts. Mitzy appears to be a Yorkshire Terrier.
- Scribble (voiced by Micky Dolenz) – A dog from the United States; who is a Spy Dog-in-training. He is the comic relief of the group and is known to eat anything. Scribble appears to be a Beagle mix.
- Angus (voiced by Jim Ward in a Scottish accent) – A Scottish Terrier from Scotland; who is the technological genius of the Spy Dogs. He is the second comic relief; second only to Scribble. He has a mother; who is also from Scotland.
- Von Rabie (voiced by Jim Cummings) – A dog of unknown breed (meant to be a Pit bull, Boxer, Rottweiler and Dobermann) from the United States, originally from Australia; who is an operative of the Spy Dogs. He is the genius bruiser of the group.
- Frank (voiced by Jess Harnell in a Brooklyn accent) – A Staffordshire Bull Terrier/Dachshund mix; who is brave. He is ready to take on anything or anybody.
- Stahl (voiced by Michael Donovan) – A German Shepherd probably from Germany; who is an operative and paranormal specialist. He is very brave and confident.
- Noodle (voiced by Billy West) – A Poodle/Bichon Frise mix from France who likes to cook. He sometimes has a tendency to worry.
- B.A.R.K. Squad – S.W.A.T. or Marine dogs. They always wear blue goggles, helmets and waistcoats.
  - Furry (voiced by Billy West) – A Doberman Pinscher; who is the leader of the B.A.R.K. Squad.
  - Dallas – A Pointer.
  - Rock – A Newfoundland Dog.
  - Buck – A St. Bernard.
  - Hatchet (voiced by Billy West) – A Shar Pei.

=== Other operatives ===
- Ayanna (voiced by Mary Kay Bergman) – A Basenji from India.
- Chukchi (voiced by Billy West) – A Siberian Husky from Antarctica who is an operative at Ice Station Husky.
- DogChow (voiced by Jim Ward) – A Chow Chow from China.
- Erin (voiced by Tress MacNeille in an Irish accent) – An Irish Setter from Ireland. Ralph has a crush on her.
- Kelly, Jill and Bree (voiced by Grey DeLisle and Soleil Moon Frye) – Three identical Afghan Hounds.
- Sir William (voiced by Jess Harnell) – A Mastiff/Bulldog mix from England who is very intelligent. He is often careful and overprotective at times.
- Mange/Musher X (voiced by Patrick Warburton) – Ralph's brother. A Chesapeake Bay Retriever.
- Talker (voiced by Charlie Adler) – He is a Golden Retriever.
- Alley (voiced by Kath Soucie) – All she needs a good friend. A Jack Russell Terrier.
- Rosey (voiced by Tress MacNeille) – She is a Chihuahua.
- Fetch (voiced by Patrick Warburton) – A Labrador Retriever.
- Nessie (voiced by Tress MacNeille) – She is a Dachshund who was mistaken for the Loch Ness Monster.
- Lunar Rover – He is a Great Dane.
- Nine (voiced by Laura San Giacomo) – She is a Basset Hound. Dog Zero's friend. She marries Three.
- Three – He is a Dalmatian. Dog Zero's friend. He marries Nine.
- Red Shirt – He is a Border Terrier.
- Renfield – He is a Golden Lab.
- Sweet L. Dingo (voiced by Kath Soucie) – She is a Dingo and the love interest of Von Rabie.
- Garm – A Rottweiler.
- Laika – A Russian accented Husky mix.
- Sebastian – A Vizsla mix.
- Scuzzy Duz (voiced by Jim Cummings) – A Bulldog mix with his own television series, who is a parody of Scooby-Doo.
- Standard Issue Puppy – A Greyhound puppy.
- Stinky Pie (voiced by Billy West).
- Saber-Toothed Mouse (voiced by Jim Cummings).
- Anubis (voiced by Lou Rawls).
- Pappy – Boston Terrier.
- Surveillance.
- Amerigo Dog Poochie (voiced by Adam West).
- Italian Dog (voiced by Jeff Bennett).
- Egyptian Dog (voiced by Jeff Bennett).
- Dog Inmates (voiced by Jeff Bennett).

=== Humans ===
- Gordon (voiced by Adam West) – Ralph's owner.
- Arty (voiced by Mary Kay Bergman) – Scribble's owner. Like Scribble, he can out of control and untrained sometimes; however, Arty's heart is in the right place and he's willing to do anything to help his mother out.
- Arty's Mom (voiced by Kath Soucie) – The unnamed mother of Arty.
- Sue (voiced by Mary Kay Bergman) – Mitzy's owner.
- Captain Earwig / Virgil (voiced by Tom Kenny) – An aspiring superhero.
- Frank's Owner (voiced by Estelle Harris) – The unnamed owner of Frank.
- Santa Claus (voiced by David McDermott).
- Kerry – The female character.
- Shelia (voice by Tress MacNeille) – Von Rabie's owner.
- Big Jim Jones (voiced by Jess Harnell).
- Christopher Columbus (voiced by Maurice LaMarche).
- William Shakespeare (voiced by Billy West).
- Leonardo da Vinci (voiced by Adam West).
- Scuzzy Duzz's owner (voiced by Mary Kay Bergman) – A bespectacled short girl who slightly resembles Velma Dinkley.

=== Villains ===
- Catastrophe (voiced by Jim Cummings) – The nemesis of the Spy Dogs organization who serves as the primary antagonist of the series. He is a cat with prosthetic mechanical tail which he wore because his natural one was bitten off by a dog or lost in an accident in a rocking chair testing facility. He tried to take over the world with an army of mummy cats and Bastet. His metal tail suggests he is a parody of Dr. No, while he is sometimes seen stroking a mouse similar to Ernst Stavro Blofeld's white cat.
  - Maws – Catastrophe's assistant with big teeth. He is a spoof of Jaws.
  - Oddball – Catastrophe's muscular Siamese cat henchman with a bowler hat and blue bowtie. Based on the villain Oddjob with the trademark bowler hat.
- Bast – The leader of the Cat Mummies who Catastrophe once enlisted.
  - Cat Mummies (vocal effects provided by Frank Welker) – A bunch of mummified cats.
- Baron Bone (voiced by Clancy Brown) – A human who attempted to corner the market in beef by luring all the cows in the world with a giant ball of cud.
  - Miss Tenderloin (voiced by Tress MacNeille) – Baron Bone's female servant.
  - Chuck – Baron Bone's henchman.
- Chauncey – An incredibly lucky, silent and charismatic runaway Super Prototype Mobile-Suit Human "mindless automaton". In order to keep him under control, Mitzy warehoused Chauncey by making him the President of the United States. He is a parody of Chauncey Gardiner from the novel and the movie "Being There" (his debut episode was actually called "Being" and had many similarities with novel/movie).
- Colosatron (voiced by Dee Bradley Baker) – A computer that wanted to take over the world. Its name and goal are taken from the film Colossus: The Forbin Project.
- D'Cell (voiced by Eddie Deezen) – A human who tried to steal every new gadget in the world so he would be on the cutting edge of technology.
- Ernest Anyway – A hunter who successfully captured Bigfoot, Mokele-mbembe, a Yeti, and his mother (Ernest's comment about it was "Don't ask"). He tried to capture the Loch Ness Monster (which turned out to be an elongated dachshund named Nessie) only to be thwarted by Ralph and Erin. His name is a parody of writer Ernest Hemingway.
- Ernst Stavro Blowfish (voiced by Ben Stein) – He took control of all the fast food restaurants in the world just because he thinks he is evil. Named after Ernst Stavro Blofeld.
  - Septic and Incus – Two scientists that work for Blowfish.
- Mistress Pavlov (voiced by Wendie Malick) – She tried to use her hypnotic powers to have the owners of dogs do her bidding. A joke on the Pavlov's Dog psychology experiment.
- Oatz Couture (voiced by Ami Dolenz) – She created clothes for dogs that were provoking diseases.
  - Taylor (voiced by Dee Bradley Baker) – Oatz Couture's assistant.
- Porkzilla (vocal effects provided by Dee Bradley Baker) – He is not really evil. After he drank a special potion made by two girls on a turnip farm to grow bigger, he became huge and went to the city to eat. Porkzilla is a spoof of Godzilla.
  - Twin Girls (Voiced by Kath Soucie and Mary Kay Bergman) – The creators of Porkzilla named Older Sue and Corny May.
- Witch Doctors – A quartet of witch doctors in suits that work as Spin Doctors at the Ferret Network. After Ralph and Stahl expose their plans to hypnotize the TV viewers, they are fired by the Ferret Network's CEO.
  - Witch Doctor Brad (voiced by Maurice LaMarche) – Leader of Witch Doctor.
  - Witch Doctor Chad (voiced by Pat Fraley) – Witch Doctor's Henchman.
  - Witch Doctor Seymour – Witch Doctor's Henchman.
  - Witch Doctor Thad – Witch Doctor's Henchman.
- Space Slugs (voiced by Maurice LaMarche and Billy West) – They tried to bury the world in slime to recreate their home world which was destroyed. Also tried to mutate the children of the world into Space Slugs by tainting lunchroom food in schools.
- The Flea Nation (voiced by Jim Cummings and Billy West) – A race of fleas.
- Granny Larceny (voiced by Tress MacNeille) – An old lady criminal who uses her babies to commit crimes.
  - Pookie, Wookums and Coochy – Granny Larceny's grand-babies who are programmed to commit crimes. Pookie is a master of the rattle-chuks. Wookums is a master of diaper-fu. Coochy has the ability of sticky drool.
- Al Catraz (voiced by Jeff Bennett) – The strict owner of the dog kennel where Ralph was dropped off while his owners were going on vacation. Al was displeased that his father had his dog inherit his fortune instead of Al.
  - Security Guard – Al Catraz's henchmen.
- Timmy (voiced by Mary Kay Bergman) – He was not really evil, he was so much of a danger to himself and those around him he had to be stopped.
- Bank Robbers (voiced by Jim Cummings).
- Counterfeiters (voiced by Billy West and Tom Kenny).

== Technology ==
- Dog tags – communicators.
- Hydrant – hydrant samurai.
- Humanesks – androids large enough to be piloted by one or two spydogs, depending on model. The slimmer models are for one spydog, and the more obese models carry a co-pilot.
- Pet Store Plane – planes. Usually used to transport cargo.
- Toilets – invented as water bowls and communication devices.
- Mitzi's hair bow – binoculars, boomerang, throwing knife, circular saw.
- B.A.R.K. uses rocket propelled grenades, rifles and plastic explosives.

=== Bones ===
- Bone bomb – bone that explodes.
- Flash bone – big flash that can temporary blind someone.
- Bone phone – telephone.

== Episode list ==
=== Season 1 (1998–1999) ===
1. K-9/Postal (September 12, 1998)
2. Hair/Homework (September 19, 1998)
3. Bone/Time (September 26, 1998)
4. Earnest/Spin (October 3, 1998)
5. Twilight/Fetch (October 10, 1998)
6. Small/Water (November 7, 1998)
7. I.H.R.F./Oatz (November 14, 1998)
8. D'Cell/Halfday (November 28, 1998)
9. Zero/Pups (January 30, 1999)
10. Obedience/DoggyLand (February 6, 1999)
11. Lunch/Iditarod (February 13, 1999)
12. Porkzilla/Money (February 20, 1999)
13. Mange/Scribble (February 27, 1999)

=== Season 2 (1999) ===
1. Tusk/Install
2. Charlie/Automutt
3. Granny/Founders
4. Tail/Tomorrow
5. Howl/Thirteen
6. Escape/Exposed
7. Virgil/Bunny
8. DNA/Santa
9. B.A.R.K./Being

== See also ==
Road Rovers
