= Jerry Trimble =

American actor and kickboxer

- Born: Kentucky, U.S.
- Occupations: Actor, stuntman, motivational speaker, martial artist
- Years active: 1990–present (acting)
- Spouse: Ami Dolenz (m. 2002)
- Martial arts career
- Style: Taekwondo, kickboxing
- Teachers: Richard Hamilton, Asa Gordon, Tony Mullinax
- Website: www.jerrytrimble.com

Jerry Trimble, nicknamed Golden Boy, is an American actor, stuntman, martial artist, motivational speaker, and former professional kickboxer. He is a former Professional Karate Association (PKA) and Professional Karate Commission (PKC) Light Welterweight World Champion.

== Life and career ==
=== Martial arts and kickboxing ===
A native of Newport, Kentucky, Trimble began training in taekwondo from the age of 14, and began his professional kickboxing career in Atlanta. Nicknamed "Golden Boy", he won the Professional Karate Association (PKA) and Professional Karate Commission (PKC) Light Welterweight World titles in 1986.

He ran a gym in Marietta, Georgia, and also had a column in Karate Illustrated magazine.

=== Acting ===
Trimble has been in over 50 feature films and TV shows, both as an actor and stunt performer. He notably played the main antagonist Jonny in the 1992 Hong Kong martial arts film The Master (opposite Jet Li), and Detective Danny Schwartz in Heat (playing alongside Al Pacino and Robert De Niro). During the 1990s, he starred in numerous direct-to-video martial arts action films.

His other film work includes Charlie's Angels (which earned him a Taurus World Stunt Award nomination for Best Fight), Mission: Impossible III (where he had a one on one fight scene with Tom Cruise), and The Green Hornet. He also appeared on the TV shows Supernatural (as Ramiel), Dark Blue, Eleventh Hour, The Flash, Supah Ninjas, and Kung Fu. He had a recurring role as Mark Hall on Chesapeake Shores.

=== Other work ===
Trimble is also a motivational speaker.

== Championships and accomplishments ==
=== Kickboxing ===
- Professional Karate Association (PKA) Light Welterweight World Champion.
- Professional Karate Commission (PKC) Light Welterweight World Champion (won 1986-04-26).

=== Halls of fame ===
- World Kickboxing League (WKL) Class of 2019.

== Personal life ==
Trimble is married to actress Ami Dolenz, daughter of The Monkees member Micky Dolenz. As of April 2015, the couple resided in Vancouver, Canada. Trimble is a dual citizen of the United States and Canada.

Trimble is a vegan.

== Filmography ==
=== Film ===
- 1990 The Master as Jonny
- 1990 The King of the Kickboxers as Drug Dealer
- 1991 Breathing Fire as Michael Moore
- 1992 Zhan long zai ye (Invincible)
- 1993 Full Contact as Luke Powers
- 1993 Live by the Fist as John Merrill
- 1993 Loving Lulu as Police Officer
- 1993 Terminator Woman as Sergeant Jay Handlin
- 1994 One Man Army as Jerry Pelt
- 1994 Stranglehold as Ryan Cooper
- 1995 Heat as Detective Danny Schwartz
- 1997 Executive Power as 'Shadow'
- 1997 Starquest II as Trit
- 1998 The Man in the Iron Mask as Lead Soldier
- 1999 Shogun Cop as Shad
- 2000 Charlie's Angels as Knox Thug
- 2001 All You Need as Hank Sabistan
- 2003 In the Name of Justice as DEA Agent John Campbell
- 2005 Today You Die as Garret's Gang #1
- 2005 War of the Worlds
- 2006 Mission: Impossible III
- 2007 The Butcher as Eddie Hellstrom
- 2007 The Last Sentinel as Last Human Cop
- 2009 90201
- 2009 Charlie Valentine as Mickey
- 2009 Green Street Hooligans 2
- 2009 Eleventh Hour
- 2011 The Green Hornet as Chudnofsky's Gang
- 2011 Hunt for the I-5 Killer as Charlie
- 2012 The Package as Carl
- 2012 Duke as George
- 2013 Bailout: The Age of Greed as Andy
- 2013 She Made Them Do It as Jackson Pender
- 2014 Tied as David
- 2014 When Sparks Fly as Lew
- 2015 Pretty Little Addict as Dr. Lee
- 2015 Mother of All Lies as Carl
- 2018 Rabbit as Denny
- 2019 "The Lost Boys" Justin
- 2020 The Color Rose as Coroner Earnest Feldman
- 2021 "Resurrection Factor" Damian
- 2021 "Kung Fu" Barclay

=== TV shows ===
- 1987–2010 Unsolved Mysteries as Alan Golder, Episode #11.3 (1999)
- 2004 Skeleton Man as Staff Sergeant Lawrence
- 2009–2010 The Colony as Marauder
- 2009–2010 Dark Blue as Bare Knuckle Fighter
- 2011 Supah Ninjas as Coach Babcock
- 2014 The Flash as Marcus Stockheimer
- 2014 Signed, Sealed, Delivered as Hoke Carey
- 2016 iZombie as Roger Thrunk
- 2017 Supernatural as Ramiel
- 2017–2019 Chesapeake Shores as Mark Hall

== See also ==
- List of male kickboxers
