= Walter Shawlee =

American slide rule collector (1949 – 2023)

- Born: November 27, 1949; Los Angeles, California, U.S.
- Died: September 4, 2023 (aged 73)
- Education: University of California, Los Angeles
- Known for: Slide rule collecting

Walter Shawlee (November 27 1949 — September 4, 2023) was a renowned American collector of slide rules. He was born in Los Angeles, and attended University of California, Los Angeles to study electronics engineering and mathematics, and left before completing a degree. He first started a company in 1979 at Prince George, British Columbia, Northern Airborne Technology, then later ran an online outlet for vintage electronics, Sphere Research Corporation, in Kelowna, with a section titled "Slide Rule Universe". In 2003, he was reported to make over $100,000 a year on the slide rule trade. Shawlee’s mother, actress Joan Shawlee, was best known for playing bandleader Sweet Sue in the Billy Wilder film Some Like It Hot, where she worked with stars Marilyn Monroe, Tony Curtis, and Jack Lemmon. She also played “Pickles” Sorrell in The Dick Van Dyke Show.

Shawlee died of cancer on September 4, 2023, at the age of 73.
