= The Adventures of Aggie =

- Joan Shawlee as Aggie
- Genre: Sitcom
- Directed by: John Guillermin; Henry Kaplan
- Starring: Joan Shawlee
- Country of origin: United Kingdom
- Original language: English
- No. of episodes: 26

Production
- Producer: Michael Sadlier
- Running time: 30 minutes

Original release
- Network: ITV
- Release: 17 September 1956 – 18 March 1957

The Adventures of Aggie is a 1957 black-and-white sitcom starring Joan Shawlee that was made by ME Films and broadcast on ITV.

It lasted for one series of twenty-six episodes. Also being aimed at the American market, it was broadcast in the US from December 1957 under the name Aggie. It was written by Martin Stern and Ernest Borneman.

Three episodes of the television show were released as a TV movie entitled Born for Trouble.

Several episodes were directed by John Guillermin.

== Plot ==
Aggie Anderson was an American working in London as a fashion buyer for an international company. Her job required her to travel often, and when abroad she often got into various troubles and accidents. These situations were often dangerous, and would involve spies and criminals.

== Cast ==
=== Main cast ===
- Joan Shawlee as Aasgard Agnette Anderson

=== Guest cast ===
- Elizabeth Allan ('Top Secret' episode)
- Patrick Allen
- Stephen Boyd
- Dick Emery
- Gordon Jackson
- Christopher Lee as Inspector Hollis
- Kevin Miles as Jack Reynolds
- Edward Mulhare
- Maggie Smith as Fiona Frobisher-Smith
- Patrick McGoohan
- John Schlesinger
- Anthony Valentine
