= Jess Barker =

American actor (1912–2000)

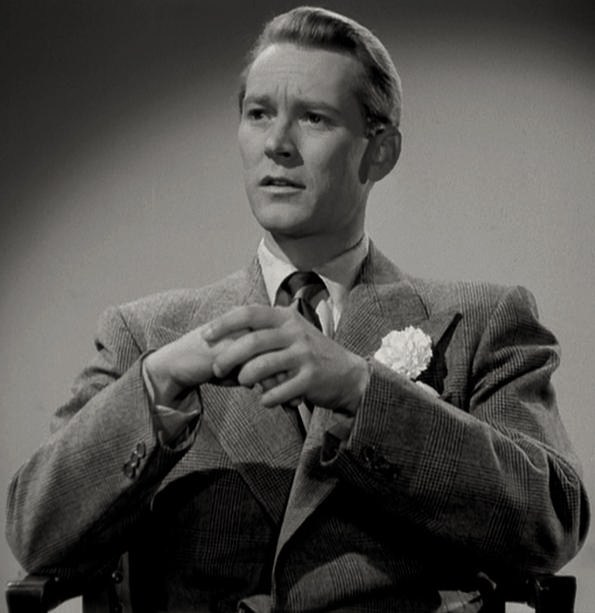
- Barker in Scarlet Street (1945)
- Born: June 4, 1912; Greenville, South Carolina, U.S.
- Died: August 8, 2000 (aged 88); Los Angeles, California, U.S.
- Occupation: Actor
- Years active: 1936–1977
- Spouse: Susan Hayward (m. 1944; div. 1954)
- Children: 3

Jess Barker (June 4, 1912 – August 8, 2000) was an American actor who was active between the 1940s and 1970s. He was best known as the first husband of actress Susan Hayward.

== Early years ==
Barker was born in Greenville, South Carolina.

== Career ==
Barker began his film career credited as Philip Barker until changing his stage name to Jess Barker in the early 1940s.

Barker's movie career was damaged because of the publicity resulting from a bitter custody dispute, but he still managed to find work as an actor on radio and films in supporting roles. Barker appeared as an art critic in Fritz Lang's Scarlet Street (1945) and the Abbott and Costello film The Time of Their Lives (1946). He also made two guest appearances on Perry Mason. In 1961 he played defendant Walter Eastman in "The Case of the Injured Innocent," and in 1965 he played Doug Hamilton in "The Case of the Murderous Mermaid."

== Personal life ==
Barker wed Susan Hayward on July 23, 1944. They had twin sons together during their ten-year marriage, whose custody was won by Hayward after a bitter court battle.

In 1956, Barker lost a paternity suit in Los Angeles. Judge Walter H. Odemar ruled that Barker was the father of a daughter born to actress Yvonne Doughty.

Barker died of liver failure in 2000.

== Filmography ==
Year	Title	Role	Notes
1936	The Trail of the Lonesome Pine	Merd Falin	Film debut
1943	Good Luck, Mr. Yates	Oliver B. Yates	
1943	Government Girl	Dana McGuire	
1944	Cover Girl	John Coudair as a Young Man	
1944	Jam Session	George Carter Haven	
1944	She's a Soldier Too	Dr. Bill White	
1945	Keep Your Powder Dry	Junior Vanderheusen	
1945	Senorita from the West	Tim Winters	
1945	This Love of Ours	Chadwick	
1945	The Daltons Ride Again	Jeff Colton	
1945	Scarlet Street	Damon Janeway	
1946	Girl on the Spot	Rick Crane	
1946	Idea Girl	Larry Brewster	
1946	The Time of Their Lives	Thomas Danbury	
1949	Take One False Step	Arnold Sykes	
1949	Reign of Terror	Saint Just	
1950	The Milkman	John Carter	
1953	Marry Me Again	Jenkins	
1954	Dragonfly Squadron	Dixon	
1955	Kentucky Rifle	Daniel Foster	
1955	Shack Out on 101	Artie	
1956	Three Bad Sisters	George Gurney	
1956	The Peacemaker	Ed Halcomb	
1957	The Silent Service	Lt. Cmdr. P.E. Summers	1 episode
1961-1965	Perry Mason	Walter Eastman/Doug Hamilton	2 episodes
1964	Night Walker	Malone	
1968	The Green Berets	Soldier	Uncredited
1975	Murph the Surf	Museum Guard	
1977	Sudden Death	Barnett	Final film
