= Samantha Juste =

British model and television presenter (1944–2014)

- Samantha Juste (left) with David Jacobs on Top of the Pops (BBC TV, around 1964)
- Born: Sandra Slater; 31 May 1944; Manchester, England
- Died: 5 February 2014 (aged 69); Los Angeles, California, U.S.
- Other name: Samantha Dolenz
- Occupations: Model; television presenter
- Spouses: Micky Dolenz (m. 1968; div. 1975) Tony Shipp (m. 1988)
- Children: Ami Dolenz

Samantha Juste (born Sandra Slater; 31 May 1944 – 5 February 2014) was a British model and television presenter who appeared in the mid-1960s as the "disc girl" on the BBC record chart television programme Top of the Pops (TOTP). In 1968, she married Micky Dolenz of the Monkees. Their daughter is actress Ami Dolenz.

== Life and career ==
Sandra Slater was born in Middleton, near Manchester, England, to Leslie Slater and Phyllis, a dressmaker, and studied textile and dress design at Rochdale College of Art. She became a teenage model and took the name Samantha Juste.

Top of the Pops was a weekly half-hour programme of current popular music, initially conceived and produced by Johnnie Stewart. It was first broadcast from Dickenson Road Studios, a converted church in Rusholme, Manchester, on 1 January 1964. Samantha Juste was assistant to Cecil Korer, the programme's assistant producer. After the first few episodes, Juste replaced Denise Sampey. For three-and-a-half years, she sat alongside the host – initially disc jockeys Jimmy Savile, David Jacobs, Alan Freeman and Pete Murray – to place records on a turntable and apply the stylus as the artist was about to perform. Some viewers found Juste's ritual incongruous, since the artists were ostensibly there to perform. However, they were miming, something of which the BBC made little secret. On one occasion, a record by The Swinging Blue Jeans was played at the wrong speed.

Juste appeared briefly in the 1965 Swinging London film The Knack ...and How to Get It, directed by Richard Lester, and also released a single the following year. She was one of two British women signed to Strike Records – whose first single and only "hit", Neil Christian's "That's Nice", was issued in February 1966 – and its subsidiary Go. The other was Jacki Bond, a secretary with Strike, who like Juste, had little musical experience.

Juste performed "No One Needs My Love Today", written by Phil Phillips, on Top of the Pops on 24 November 1966. The record was produced by Miki Dallon. The backing music was provided by an orchestra conducted by Ken Woodman, who had worked with Chris Andrews and Sandie Shaw, and is best known for "Town Talk", which became the theme tune of The Jimmy Young Show when BBC Radio 1 launched in 1967. "No One Needs My Love Today" was not a hit, but it was featured as a climber by the offshore "pirate" station Radio London in the week beginning 20 November 1966. One critic commented that "any vocal shortcomings on this single are outweighed by her charming delivery".

During Top of the Pops, Juste met artists who contributed to the British rock boom of the mid-1960s. In January 1967, the American group The Monkees, formed for an eponymous television series, reached the top of the British charts with "I'm a Believer", written by Neil Diamond. The drummer Micky Dolenz recalled (in the third person) that he spotted Juste as he passed a studio cafeteria:

She is tall, blond[e], beautiful, and wearing an emerald green outfit that ends up in a short skirt (very short) which tops off her unbelievably gorgeous legs ... She holds his glance briefly then looks quickly away with that haughty sophistication that only the British can do so well.

Juste and Dolenz began a relationship. Dolenz appears not to have realised that Juste was a celebrity and the publicity took him by surprise. "Monkeemania" was such that some of the Monkees' female fans resented Juste – "she even showed up one day with ink stains on the emerald green dress" – and Dolenz claimed the couple spent a week in her London flat. For much of 1967, Juste and Dolenz remained together in England and the US.

Juste wrote articles for the teenage magazine 16 about her time with the Monkees. She left Top of the Pops and moved with Dolenz to California, where they lived in Laurel Canyon in the Hollywood Hills. In June 1967, they attended the Monterey Pop Festival.

Peter Tork [of the Monkees] and Micky turned up at the pop fest in Monterey, Peter acting as one of the emcees [masters of ceremony], Micky wandering around the grounds dressed as an Indian with a lovely British [woman], Samantha Juste, at his side.

Juste and Dolenz were married in July 1968. Dolenz's stepfather, Dr. Robert Scott, officiated. The couple's daughter, Ami Bluebell Dolenz, became an actress. Dolenz and Juste hosted parties attended by musicians and celebrities. Their friend, the songwriter Harry Nilsson, invited Dolenz and Juste to travel with him to Ireland to lend credibility when he met the parents of a woman he thought he might marry. Juste's father, Leslie Slater, helped Dolenz construct a studio used for "jam" sessions by John Lennon, Brian Wilson and Alice Cooper.

The Monkees disbanded in 1971, and Dolenz's self-indulgence took its toll on his marriage. Juste and Dolenz divorced in 1975, Juste retaining custody of their daughter, although they were reconciled as friends by the early 1990s. In 2002, Juste was photographed with Dolenz at Ami's wedding in Beverly Hills to actor and martial artist Jerry Trimble.

== Business interests ==
While in California, Juste began her own fashion business, which she moved to Acapulco, Mexico, in 1976. She taught design in Ireland, then returned to the United States, where she and her daughter, Ami, began an online jewellery business, Bluebell Boutique.

== Death ==
Juste suffered a stroke in her sleep on 2 February 2014 and died on 5 February 2014 in Los Angeles, California.
