= Janelle Johnson =

American film actress

- Born: December 2, 1923; Austin, Texas, U.S.
- Died: December 2, 1995 (aged 72); Los Gatos, California, U.S.
- Occupation: Actress
- Spouses: George Dolenz (m. 1944; died 1963) Robert Scott (m. 1965; died 1985)
- Children: 4, including Micky Dolenz
- Relatives: Ami Dolenz (granddaughter)

Janelle Johnson (December 2, 1923 – December 2, 1995) was an American film actress of the 1940s. She married actor George Dolenz and was the mother of Micky Dolenz of the 1960s pop-rock band the Monkees. Her English daughter-in-law was Samantha Juste, co-host of BBC television's Top of the Pops in its early days. Her granddaughter, Ami Dolenz, also became a film actress.

== Background and career ==
Johnson was born in Austin, Texas, and was valedictorian of her class at St. Mary's Academy. She won the drama award at the University of Texas at Austin and performed on a local radio show called Janelle Sings. Her films included David O. Selznick's Academy Award-winning Since You Went Away (1944), with Claudette Colbert, Jennifer Jones, Robert Walker and Shirley Temple, and The Brute Man (1946), directed by Jean Yarbrough, with Rondo Hatton and Jane "Poni" Adams.

== Personal life ==
Johnson met her Trieste-born Slovene husband, George Dolenz, while performing in a stage play called Return Engagement, but largely gave up acting after their marriage.

The couple had four children: Micky, the eldest, and three daughters. After Dolenz's death in 1963, she married, on April 23, 1965, Robert Leroy Schmitz, a minister of religion who was the officiant at the 1968 wedding of Micky Dolenz and Samantha Juste. Schmitz, who also used the surname Scott, died in 1985.

Johnson died of cancer in Los Gatos, California, on her 72nd birthday.
