= Joan Shawlee =

American actress (1926–1987)

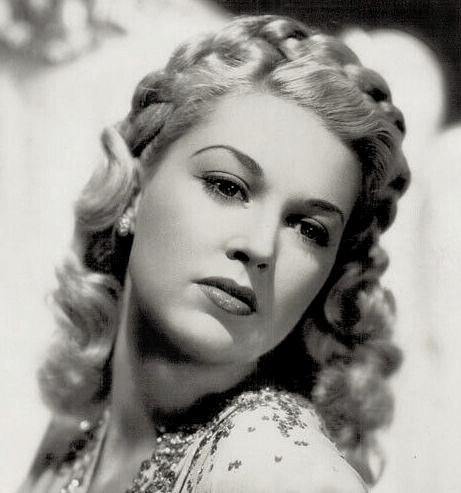
- Shawlee in 1945
- Born: March 5, 1926; Forest Hills, New York, U.S.
- Died: March 22, 1987 (aged 61); Hollywood, California, U.S.
- Resting place: Remains scattered at sea
- Other names: Joan Fulton; Joyce Ring
- Occupation: Actress
- Years active: 1945–1986
- Spouses: Walter Shawlee (m. 1950; div. 1956) Eddie Barchet (m. 1958, divorced)
- Children: Angela Shawlee, Walter Shawlee

Joan Shawlee (née Fulton; March 5, 1926 – March 22, 1987) was an American film and television actress. She is known for her recurring role as Fiona "Pickles" Sorrell in The Dick Van Dyke Show, a career-defining turn in Billy Wilder's comedy Some Like It Hot (1959) playing Sweet Sue, the abrasive martinet in charge of Marilyn Monroe's all-girl jazz band, and as the flamboyant Madame Pompey in the 1957 Maverick episode "Stampede" with James Garner. She was sometimes credited under her birth name.

== Early years ==
Shawlee was born in Forest Hills, New York to Theodore Cuyler Fulton, an automobile salesman, and Esther L. (Ring) Fulton. She moved with her parents and two brothers, Theodore Cuyler Fulton Jr. and Albert Fulton, to Vancouver, British Columbia, when she was five years old.

== Career ==
=== Dancing and modeling ===
Shawlee studied ballet under Ernest Belcher. At the age of fourteen, she began to work as a model for the John Robert Powers agency in New York, and worked later as a showgirl on Broadway. Billed as Joyce Ring, she appeared in the musical productions By Jupiter (1942) and A Connecticut Yankee (1943).

=== Film ===
A tall woman (5'9"), she was known for small parts in Jack Lemmon and Billy Wilder films. She is probably best remembered for her role as bandleader Sweet Sue in Some Like It Hot (1959) starring Marilyn Monroe, Tony Curtis, and Lemmon. She appeared as Sylvia in The Apartment (1960), and as Amazon Annie in Irma la Douce, both of which starred Lemmon and Shirley MacLaine. She also appeared in Wilder's final film, Buddy Buddy (1981).

=== Television ===
Shawlee had a recurring role on TV in The Dick Van Dyke Show as Fiona "Pickles" Sorrell, wife of writer Maurice "Buddy" Sorrell (Morey Amsterdam). She played the lead in The Adventures of Aggie (1956–57), which ran for only one season. She played Lorna Peterson on Betty Hutton's short-lived series Goldie; Margo on the 1976–77 crime drama The Feather and Father Gang; and Tessie on Joe's World. She was also a regular on The Abbott and Costello Show. She played a dead criminal's wife in Stories of the Century with Jim Davis and a 1957 episode of Maverick titled "Stampede", starring James Garner and Efrem Zimbalist Jr., in which she portrayed the exuberant Madame Pompey. Her final acting appearance was in an episode of Crazy Like a Fox in 1985.

=== Comedy team ===
In the early 1960s, Shawlee and actress Mitzi McCall teamed up as a night club act. They opened at the Club Robaire in Cleveland. In January 1961, syndicated newspaper columnist Dorothy Kilgallen reported that the team was "causing quite a stir", while drawing attention to – and exaggerating – their discrepancy in height: "Joan being six feet, three inches tall and Mitzi four feet, 10 inches short."

== Personal life ==
Shawlee and her second husband, Eddie Barchet, had a daughter, Angela.

== Death ==
Shawlee died of breast cancer, in Hollywood, California, on March 22, 1987, aged 61. She was cremated and her ashes scattered at sea.

== Filmography ==
=== Film ===
Year	Title	Role	Notes
1945	Men in Her Diary	Courtroom Spectator	Uncredited
1945	This Love of Ours	Chorus Girl	Uncredited
1945	Frontier Gal	Hostess	Uncredited
1946	Because of Him	Autograph Seeker	
1946	Idea Girl	Mabel	
1946	Swing High, Swing Sweet		Short
1946	Tangier	Rocco's Blonde	
1946	House of Horrors	Stella McNally	
1946	The Runaround	Mamie 'Baby' Willis	
1946	Inside Job	Ruth	
1946	Lover Come Back	Janie	
1946	Cuban Pete	Ann	
1946	White Tie and Tails	Virgie	
1947	I'll Be Yours	Blonde	
1947	The Michigan Kid	Soubrette	
1947	Song of Scheherazade	French Girl	Uncredited
1947	Buck Privates Come Home	Sylvia Hunter	
1947	The Vigilantes Return	Ben's Girl	
1950	Woman on the Run	Tipsy Blonde in Bar	
1950	Prehistoric Women	Lotee	
1951	Two Tickets to Broadway	Tall Brunette in Boardinghouse	Uncredited
1952	The Marrying Kind	Tall Party Dancer / Woman at Airport (uncredited)	
1952	Sound Off	Showgirl	Uncredited
1952	Something for the Birds	Woman in Subway Station	Uncredited
1952	Because of You	Autograph Seeker	Uncredited
1953	All Ashore	Hedy	
1953	Loose in London	Tall Girl at Party	Uncredited
1953	From Here to Eternity	Sandra	Uncredited
1954	Pride of the Blue Grass	Mrs. Casey	
1954	Casanova's Big Night	Beatrice D'Brizzi	Uncredited
1954	About Mrs. Leslie	Jill - Nightclub Girl	
1954	Francis Joins the WACS	Sergeant Kipp	
1954	A Star Is Born	Joan	Uncredited
1955	Bowery to Bagdad	Velma 'Cindy Lou' Calhoun	
1955	Conquest of Space	Rosie McCann	
1955	Born for Trouble	Aggie Anderson	
1957	A Farewell to Arms	Blonde Nurse	Uncredited
1959	Some Like It Hot	Sweet Sue	
1960	The Apartment	Sylvia	
1963	Critic's Choice	Marge Orr	
1963	Irma la Douce	Amazon Annie	
1964	Guerillas in Pink Lace	Miss Gloria Maxine	
1966	The Wild Angels	Momma Monahan	
1967	The Reluctant Astronaut	Blonde in Bar	
1967	The St. Valentine's Day Massacre	Edna, Frank's Girlfriend	Uncredited
1967	Tony Rome	Fat Candy	
1968	Live A Little Love A Little	Robbie's Mother	
1971	One More Train to Rob	Big Nellie	
1971	Willard	Alice	
1975	Flash and the Firecat	Rose	
1975	Farewell, My Lovely	Garrulous Woman in Dance Hall	
1981	Buddy Buddy	Receptionist	
1981	Longshot	Motel Manager	
1982	Kiss My Grits	Wanda	
1984	City Heat	Peggy Barker	

=== Television ===
Year	Title	Role	Notes
1952–1953	My Little Margie	Sandra Fleming	2 episodes
1953	The Adventures of Ozzie and Harriet	The Registrar / Marion	2 episodes
1953	Your Jeweler's Showcase	Janice	Episode: "Lady's Choice"
1953	General Electric Theater	Angie McGonigle	Season 2 Episode 12: "The Marriage Fix"
1953	The Abbott and Costello Show	Miss Brown / Telephone Operator / Twin Waitresses (uncredited) / Opera-Loving Lady in Park / Marriage License Bureau Clerk / Cash Register Lady / Eyewitness in Courtroom / Receptionist / Girl in Doctor's Office	8 episodes
1954	The Pepsi-Cola Playhouse		Season 1 Episode 17: "Farewell Performance"
1954	Stories of the Century	Sarah Brinkley	Season 1 Episode 21: "The Doolin Gang"
1956	Ethel Barrymore Theatre		Season 1 Episode 5: "The Peabody's"
1956–1957	The Adventures of Aggie	Aggie	Series regular
1957	Maverick	Madame Pompey	Season 1 Episode 9: "Stampede"
1958	Zorro	Barmaid Clara	2 episodes
1959–1960	The Betty Hutton Show	Lorna	11 episodes
1961	Some Like It Hot	Sweet Sue	TV Movie
1961	The Rifleman	Mary Woodson	Season 3 Episode 32: "The Lonesome Bride"
1963	The Dick Van Dyke Show	Pickles Sorrell	3 episodes
1963	The New Phil Silvers Show	Dr. Hornsby	Season 1 Episode 1: "Man It's Like Progress"
1963	Glynis	Dance Hall Hostess	Season 1 Episode 2: "Ten Cents a Dance"
1965	Hazel	Mrs. Fox	Season 5 Episode 3: "How to Lose 30 Pounds in 30 Minutes"
1967	Run for Your Life	Landlady	Season 2 Episode 23: "The Assassin"
1967	The Red Skelton Show	Ruby - San Fernando's Secretary	Season 17 Episode 13: "Little Old Rainmaker: He"
1968	Adam-12	Mrs. Lorena Getz	Season 1 Episode 3: "Log 11: It's Just a Little Dent, Isn't It?"
1968	Something for a Lonely Man	Hooker	TV Movie
1968	The Name of the Game	Mrs. Bronson	Season 1 Episode 14: "Pineapple Rose"
1970	Love, American Style	Bernice Franks	Season 1 Episode 21: "segment: Love and the Marriage Counselor"
1970	Storefront Lawyers	Aunt Sadie	Season 1 Episode 3: "Murph Collins vs. Tomorrow"
1971	Arnie	Myra	Season 2 Episode 3: "Honey, I'm Sorry, But..."
1971	Columbo	Mitilda	Season 1 Episode 4: "Suitable for Framing"
1971	Dead Men Tell No Tales	Polly Grant	TV Movie
1972	The Rookies	Josie	Season 1 Episode 5: "Covenant with Death"
1974	The Magician	Trudy Kroll	Season 1 Episode 11: "The Illusion of the Curious Counterfeit: Part I"
1974	Mannix	(Annie) Duchess	Season 7 Episode 21: "Mask for a Charade"
1974	Movin' On	Juleen Wallace	Season 1 Episode 2: "Roadblock"
1974–1976	Emergency!	Wife / Heather	2 episodes
1975	Matt Helm	The Saleslady	Season 1 Episode 0: "Matt Helm"
1975	S.W.A.T.	Parlor Owner	Season 1 Episode 11: "Blind Man's Bluff"
1975	Police Story	Emma	Season 3 Episode 6: "Face for a Shadow"
1976–1977	The Feather and Father Gang	Margo	Series regular
1977	The Tony Randall Show	Joanie Biederbeck	Season 1 Episode 13: "Case: The Hooper Affair"
1977	Never Con a Killer	Margo	TV Movie
1978	Quincy M.E.	Nurse	Season 4 Episode 8: "No Way to Treat a Body"
1978	Starsky and Hutch	Mrs. Krupp	Season 4 Episode 12: "Starsky's Brother"
1979	Delta House	Verona Margolefsky	Season 1 Episode 5: "The Lady in Weighting"
1980	The Last Resort	Agnes	Season 1 Episode 13: "Dorm Window"
1980	Joe's World	Tessie	2 episodes
1981	Child Bride of Short Creek	Isaac's Mother	TV Movie
1981–1982	Hart to Hart	Mrs. Goodrich / Marie	2 episodes
1982	Archie Bunker's Place	Joanie	Season 4 Episode 1: "Archie's Night Out"
1985	Highway to Heaven	Woman in Park	Season 1 Episode 20: "The Banker and the Bum"
1985	Crazy Like a Fox	Manager	Season 1 Episode 12: "Suitable for Framing"
