= Vendetta (1950 film) =

1950 American drama produced by Howard Hughes

- theatrical poster
- Directed by: Max Ophüls (fired); Preston Sturges (fired); Stuart Heisler (uncredited); Paul Weatherwax (sub for Heisler); Mel Ferrer; Howard Hughes (pick-ups)
- Written by: Prosper Mérimée (novella); Peter O'Crotty (adaptation); W. R. Burnett (screenplay); Preston Sturges (uncredited); Wells Root (uncredited)
- Produced by: Howard Hughes
- Starring: Faith Domergue; George Dolenz
- Cinematography: Franz Planer; Al Gilks
- Edited by: Stuart Gilmore; Robert Seiter; Paul Weatherwax
- Music by: Roy Webb
- Distributed by: RKO Radio Pictures
- Release date: December 25, 1950 (US)
- Running time: 83 minutes
- Country: United States
- Language: English
- Budget: $3 million

Vendetta is a 1950 American crime film based on the 1840 novella Colomba by Prosper Mérimée, about a young Corsican girl who pushes her brother to kill to avenge their father's murder.

The film, produced by Howard Hughes as a vehicle for his latest discovery, Faith Domergue, began principal photography for United Artists in 1946, but was not released until four years later through RKO Pictures, which Hughes had recently purchased. Hughes fired director Max Ophüls as well as his producing partner, Preston Sturges, who replaced Ophüls. Stuart Heisler completed the film, but Hughes decided he wanted more changes and brought in actor/director Mel Ferrer, who is the only credited director on the film. Hughes himself did some direction of pick-up scenes. The screenplay was credited to W. R. Burnett, but the script was worked on by a number of writers, including Sturges, who originated the project at Hughes's behest.

Vendetta is estimated to have cost around $4 million, an extraordinary amount for the time. The film was neither a critical nor a box office success.

== Plot ==
In 1825, in the village of Pietranera in French-controlled Corsica, hot-blooded maiden Colomba della Rabia (Faith Domergue) wants her brother Orso (George Dolenz) to avenge the murder of their father by the powerful Barracini family. Despite being a lieutenant, Orso is a man of peace and reason who opposes the Corsican practice of vendetta and revenge; he is more interested in courting the beautiful English aristocrat, Lydia Nevil (Hillary Brooke), who is vacationing on the island with her father, Colonel Sir Thomas Nevil (Nigel Bruce).

To persuade Orso to do his family duty, Colomba must have the help of a family friend, the "bandit" Padrino (Donald Buka), and his servant Brando (Hugo Haas). When Orso is finally convinced that the Barracinis are guilty, and were acquitted at trial due to perjured testimony, he challenges Vincente Barracini to a duel, which pleases Colomba but horrifies Lydia. She is now bethrothed to Orso, but threatens to leave him if he goes through with the duel.

When Orso heads to the appointed place, Colomba finds out that the Barracini brothers are going to ambush him, and rides out to give him warning. In the confrontation that comes, Colomba is shot and dies in Orso's arms, the Barracinis are killed, and Orso is wounded, but not seriously. Padrino tells the grief-stricken Orso that he must use his experience to guide the people to a better way of living, breaking the cycle of vendetta and death.

== Cast ==
- Faith Domergue as Colomba della Rabia
- George Dolenz as Lieutenant Orso Antonio della Rabia
- Donald Buka as Padrino the Bandit
- Joseph Calleia as Mayor Guido Barracini
- Robert Warwick as The French Prefect
- Hugo Haas as Brando, a bandit
- Hillary Brooke as Lydia Nevil
- Nigel Bruce as Sir Thomas Nevil

== Production ==
=== Sturges and Ophüls ===
The saga of the making of Vendetta, which had the working titles of "Colomba" and "Our Lady of the Doves", is extensive. In 1944, after ten years, writer/director Preston Sturges left Paramount Pictures, where he made his most popular and successful films, including the runaway hit The Lady Eve (1941), and joined in a partnership with eccentric millionaire aviator Howard Hughes to create California Pictures. By September 1945, work has already begun on the new company's first picture, The Sin of Harold Diddlebock, written and directed by Sturges, and it was announced that Sturges had completed the first draft of an adaptation of Prosper Mérimée's 1840 novella Colomba, the first time it had been used as the basis for a sound film. (It was adapted in 1920 in France as a silent film.) Sturges began the project at the request of Hughes, who was looking for a vehicle for his protégée, Faith Domergue.

By July 1946, German director Max Ophüls had been announced as the director, in what would be his American debut. Ophüls had been trying for four years to get a directing job in Hollywood, and Sturges hired him so that he could concentrate on completing ...Harold Diddlebock. Ophüls' first choices to play opposite Domergue were James Mason and Madeleine Carroll, but Hughes refused to pay star salaries, and worried that Domergue, who had little acting experience, would be outshone by powerful and better-known actors. The cast that was eventually assembled under Ophüls had Domergue, Robert Ryan, J. Carrol Naish, Gregory Marshall, George Renevant, and Fortunio Bonanova. Principal photography began in mid-August 1946.

After only a week of shooting, Hughes, who was recuperating from the crash of an experimental reconnaissance plane, complained to Sturges about the slowness of Ophüls' shooting pace and the way he handled Domergue. Saying that he did not want "foreigners" working for California Pictures, he forced Sturges to fire Ophüls; the German director later made the film Caught (1949) about his experience with Hughes. Sturges took over the remainder of allotted filming, and principal photography wrapped on 29 October, with the film over both its shooting schedule and its budget.

=== Stuart Heisler ===
At this point, Hughes was still unhappy with the footage produced, so Sturges either quit the film or was fired, and his partnership with Hughes was dissolved, with both of the company's films, Vendetta and The Sin of Harold Diddlebock, seriously overbudget. Hughes bought director Stuart Heisler out of his contract with Gary Cooper to be the new director for Vendetta, fired at least two members of the cast, and replaced the entire production staff. He cut out one of the major characters, the son of the aristocratic English lady, because he was dissatisfied with actor Gregory Marshall's performance, and because he wanted Domergue to get more screen exposure.

Principal photography began again on 8 November with Heisler directing, and with George Dolenz and Donald Buka as the new co-stars, but paused again for about 10 days near the end of the month for the script to be re-written. Filming started up again, with some new cast members, on 2 December and proceeded until 15 March 1947. During this time, writers W. R. Burnett and Peter O'Crotty were engaged, in January, to do more re-writes, and director Heisler became ill for several days so that editor Paul Weatherwax had to substitute for him. By this time, the film had been shooting for 88 days.

Burnett later recalled he was bought on to the film by Heisler, who asked him to look at footage. Burnett said it was "terrible" so he and Heisler told Hughes they could not save the movie. Burnett wrote a new script and Heisler filmed it.

== Notes ==
- McGilligan, Patrick; Mate, Ken (1986). "W.R. Burnett: The Outsider". In McGilligan, Patrick (ed.). Backstory : interviews with screenwriters of Hollywood's golden age. University of California press. pp. 49–84.

=== Mel Ferrer ===
Hughes was dissatisfied with the result of Heisler's work and wanted a new ending for the film. He and Heisler were unable to agree, and Heisler departed in May 1947. Hughes then brought in actor/director Mel Ferrer, who he borrowed from David O. Selznick's production company in June, to finish the film, with the expectation that his assignment would last about 30 days and cost about $200,000. Hughes also hired Wells Root to do re-writes, and replaced the director of photography.

Ferrer began shooting on 6 October 1947. Because Hughes kept expanding what was to be re-shot, this phase of the production ended up taking almost seven weeks and costing over $1 million. Shooting wrapped in late November, but by March 1948, Hughes wanted more changes, and Ferrer came back to do re-shoots beginning on 27 March, with Hughes himself directing some pick-up scenes.

=== Corriganville ===
During the course of the film's extensive shooting, much of which was done at Samuel Goldwyn Studios, location shooting was done at the Corriganville Movie Ranch in Simi Valley, California and in Monterey, California. A village set was built in 1946 for the film with Ray Corrigan renaming the set "the Corsican Village". The set was used for several films but was removed after Bob Hope took over ownership of the property in 1965, the set gone by November 1967.

== Release and reception ==
Vendetta was finally released in 1950, premiering in New York City on 25 December, over four years after filming had begun. The film had been made at the estimated expenditure of over $4 million, an extraordinary amount for the time for a film that had no big stars and was not epic in scale. United Artists had originally been contracted to distribute the film, but after Hughes bought RKO Radio Pictures in the middle of 1948, he paid UA $600,000 for the rights to Vendetta, The Sin of Harold Diddlebock, and The Outlaw, and announced he would distribute them through RKO. The film was marketed with the taglines "She lives by the code of the vendetta!" and "Love is wild - life is violent - death is cheap!"

In the course of production on Vendetta, there had been no significant problems with the censors at the Hays Office, although chief censor Joseph Breen had complained in August 1949 about the overtones of "unholy love" (i.e. incest) in the film, referring to the relationship between "Colomba" and "Orso", and after the film was released, conservative publisher Martin Quigley made the same complaint. The censors also objected to the ad campaign for the film, which, like the campaign for Hughes' The Outlaw, featured Domergue's exposed cleavage. Despite these concerns, no states banned or cut the film.

It is not known what percentage of the final released film can be ascribed to the various directors who worked on it. News reports at the time claimed that little of what either Ophüls or Sturges shot was retained in the film; perhaps no more than a couple of minutes. Heisler's footage apparently makes up less than two-thirds of the finished film; although it was reported that Hughes had agreed to give Heisler a screen credit, only Mel Ferrer is credited on the released film.

Preston Sturges later wrote that Vendetta was the best adaptation he had ever done, but how much of his script was used in the final film is not known – little enough that his autobiography lists his script for the film as being "unproduced".

Vendetta was a critical and box office flop.

== In popular culture ==
A poster for the movie appears in Chandler and Joey's apartment in the NBC sitcom Friends, under the alternate title Lover's Revenge.

== Notes ==
- McGilligan, Patrick; Mate, Ken (1986). "W.R. Burnett: The Outsider". In McGilligan, Patrick (ed.). Backstory : interviews with screenwriters of Hollywood's golden age. University of California press. pp. 49–84.
