= Ami Dolenz =

American actress

- Born: Ami Bluebell Dolenz; January 8, 1969 (age 57); Burbank, California, U.S.
- Other name: Amy Dolenz
- Occupation: Actress
- Years active: 1985–2010
- Spouse: Jerry Trimble (m. 2002)
- Parents: Micky Dolenz (father); Samantha Juste (mother)
- Relatives: George Dolenz (paternal grandfather); Janelle Johnson (paternal grandmother)

Ami Bluebell Dolenz (/ˈeɪmi ˈdoʊlənz/ AY-mee DOH-lənz; born January 8, 1969) is an American-Canadian retired actress.

== Early life ==
Dolenz was born in Burbank, California, into a show business family. She is the daughter of Micky Dolenz of the 1960s group The Monkees, and British television presenter Samantha Juste. Her paternal grandparents were the film actors George Dolenz and Janelle Johnson.

== Career ==
At age 15, Dolenz won a junior talent contest and decided to become an actress. She dropped out of high school and began appearing in roles on various television series. One of her first acting roles was in the television movie The Children of Times Square, followed by a two-episode stint on Growing Pains. In 1987, she had a small role in the comedy Can't Buy Me Love. Later that year, she landed the role of Melissa McKee in the long-running soap opera General Hospital; the role garnered critical attention for Dolenz and she earned two nominations (in 1988 and 1989, respectively) for a Young Artist Award.

After leaving General Hospital in 1989, Dolenz landed a co-starring role opposite Tony Danza in She's Out of Control. The following year, she portrayed Sloane Peterson in Ferris Bueller, a television sitcom based on Ferris Bueller's Day Off, which lasted only thirteen episodes and was cancelled in 1991. After its demise, Dolenz starred in Children of the Night and then had the lead role in 1992's Miracle Beach.

Throughout the 1990s, Dolenz continued to appear in films and television, including Witchboard 2: The Devil's Doorway; Pumpkinhead II: Blood Wings; Murder, She Wrote; Wake, Rattle and Roll; Saved by the Bell: The College Years; Demolition University; Pacific Blue; and Teen Angel. In 1998, she voiced a character for the children's show The Secret Files of the Spy Dogs. After a four-year hiatus from acting, Dolenz returned in the independent film Mr. Id, in a co-starring role with Steve Parlavecchio. In 2007, she appeared in the film Even If, which she also produced.

== Personal life ==
On August 10, 2002, Dolenz married actor and martial artist Jerry Trimble.

In addition to acting, Dolenz and her husband manage KidPix Productions, a company that stages movie shoots as birthday parties for children. She also performs with the Write Act Repertory Theatre, and owns Bluebell Boutique, an online custom jewelry shop that she previously co-owned and operated with her late mother.

Both Dolenz and Trimble currently reside in Vancouver, British Columbia, Canada; they became Canadian citizens on September 14, 2021.

== Selected filmography ==
Film roles
Year	Title	Role	Notes
1987	Can't Buy Me Love	Fran	
1989	She's Out of Control	Katie Simpson	
1990	Faith	Cheryl	German film
1991	Children of the Night	Lucy Barrett	
1992	Miracle Beach	Jeannie Peterson	
1992	Rescue Me	Ginny Grafton	
1993	Stepmonster	Wendy	
1993	Ticks	Dee Dee Davenport	Direct-to-video release; alternate title: Infested
1993	Witchboard 2: The Devil's Doorway	Paige	Alternate title: Witchboard: The Return
1993	White Wolves: A Cry in the Wild II	Cara	
1994	Pumpkinhead II: Blood Wings	Jenny Braddock	Direct-to-video release
1995	Life 101	Joy	Direct-to-video release
1997	Demolition University	Jenny	Direct-to-video release
1999	Shogun Cop	Sacrificed Virgin	
2003	Mr. Id	Heather Dombrowski	
2007	Even If	Kate	Short film; also producer
2008	2012: Doomsday	Susan	Direct-to-DVD release
2009	New Hope Manor	Claudia	Alternate title: House Rules for Bad Girls

Television roles
Year	Title	Role	Notes
1985–86	Growing Pains	Linda	2 episodes
1986	Starman	Kelly Jordan	Episode: "One for the Road"
1987	Mr. Belvedere	Shannon	Episode: "The Ticket"
1987–89	General Hospital	Melissa McKee	[unknown episodes]
1989	Hardball	Lauren	Episode: "The Out of Towner"
1990	Superboy	Jessica James	Episode: "Superstar"
1990–91	Ferris Bueller	Sloan Peterson	Main role, 13 episodes
1993	Murder, She Wrote	Tracey Noble	Episode: "Bloodlines"
1994	Saved by the Bell: The College Years	Christy	Episode: "Marry Me"
1997	Pacific Blue	Darla Wallenchik	Episode: "Runaway"
1997	Teen Angel	Cindy	Episode: "Living Doll"
1998	The Secret Files of the Spy Dogs	Oatz Cautere	Voice role; episode: "I.H.R.F./Oatz"
2001	Dark Realm	Helen/Melissa Cochran	2 episodes
2010	Rules of Engagement	Lori	Episode: "Reunion"

== Award nominations ==
Year	Award	Category	Title	Result	Refs
1988	Young Artist Award	Best Young Actress Starring in a Television Drama Series	General Hospital	Nominated	
1989	Young Artist Award	Best Young Actress in a Daytime Drama Series	General Hospital	Nominated	
