= She's a Soldier Too =

1944 film directed by William Castle

- Theatrical release poster
- Directed by: William Castle
- Screenplay by: Melvin Levy
- Story by: Harold Jacob Smith
- Produced by: Wallace MacDonald
- Starring: Beulah Bondi; Nina Foch; Jess Barker; Lloyd Bridges; Percy Kilbride; Ida Moore
- Cinematography: Benjamin H. Kline
- Edited by: Aaron Stell
- Production company: Columbia Pictures
- Distributed by: Columbia Pictures
- Release date: June 29, 1944
- Running time: 67 minutes
- Country: United States
- Language: English

She's a Soldier Too is a 1944 American drama film directed by William Castle and written by Melvin Levy. The film stars Beulah Bondi, Nina Foch, Jess Barker, Lloyd Bridges, Percy Kilbride and Ida Moore. The film was released on June 29, 1944, by Columbia Pictures.

== Cast ==
- Beulah Bondi as Agatha Kittredge
- Nina Foch as Tessie Legruda
- Jess Barker as Dr. Bill White
- Lloyd Bridges as Charles Jones
- Percy Kilbride as Jonathan Kittredge
- Ida Moore as Julia Kittredge
