= George Dolenz =

American actor (1908–1963)

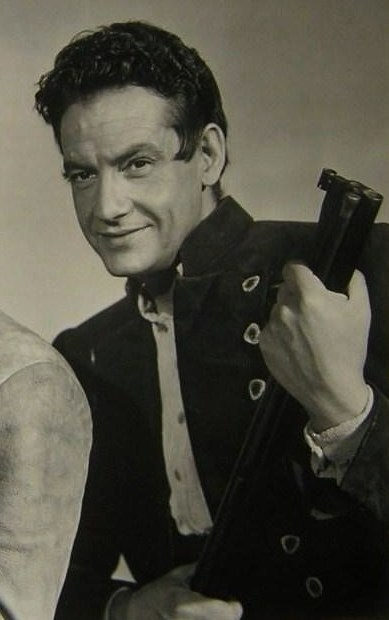
- Dolenz in Vendetta (1950)
- Born: Jure Dolenc; January 5, 1908; Trieste, Austria-Hungary
- Died: February 8, 1963 (aged 55); Hollywood, California, U.S.
- Resting place: Forest Lawn Memorial Park, Glendale, California, U.S.
- Other names: Giorgio Dolenz; George Dolentz
- Occupation: Actor
- Years active: 1941–1963
- Spouse: Janelle Johnson (m. 1943)
- Children: 4, including Micky Dolenz
- Relatives: Ami Dolenz (granddaughter)

George Dolenz (born Jure Dolenc; akas: Giorgio Dolenz and George Dolentz; January 5, 1908 – February 8, 1963) was an American film actor born in Trieste (then part of Austria-Hungary, now Italy), in the city's Slovene community.

== Biography ==
Under the name Giorgio Dolenz (Slovene: Jure Dolenc), he emigrated to the United States via Cuba, arriving by steamship at the port of Key West, Florida, in October 1934. By 1937, Dolenz was in Hollywood and working as a waiter.

After appearing in small parts in B movies, he graduated to supporting roles. Following the end of World War II, Dolenz became a leading man under contract to RKO Pictures under Howard Hughes. However, the failure of the feature film Vendetta in 1950 resulted in his return to character and supporting parts for other studios, including MGM's The Last Time I Saw Paris as the husband of Donna Reed's character.

He was cast as the star of the 1956 ITC Entertainment 39-episode television series The Count of Monte Cristo as title character Edmond Dantes. On April 21, 1958, Dolenz played Count Peter Von Gilsa in the episode "The Outlander" of the NBC Western television series The Restless Gun. In 1959, he portrayed Colonel Gutterez in "The Town Is a Prisoner" episode of the NBC Western series Cimarron City.

Dolenz played Juan Amontillo in the 1961 episode "The Uncourageous" of the ABC Western series The Rebel. That same year, he played Ramon Ortega in the "Brand of Honesty" episode of the NBC Western series The Deputy. His last role was playing Eduard D'Arcy in the season 4 episode 20 of Bonanza titled "Marie, My Love" aired February 10, 1963.

Dolenz married actress Janelle Johnson and they had four children: actor and singer Micky Dolenz (George Michael Dolenz) of the 1960s musical band the Monkees, Gemma "Coco" Dolenz, Gina Dolenz and Debbie Dolenz.

Dolenz died of a heart attack in 1963 at the age of 55. He is interred at Forest Lawn Memorial Park in Glendale, California.

== Partial filmography ==
Year	Title	Role	Notes
1941	Unexpected Uncle	George, Colony Club Headwaiter	Uncredited
1942	Take a Letter, Darling	Assistant Headwaiter	Uncredited
1943	No Time for Love	Captain of Waiters	Uncredited
1943	Young Ideas	Pepe	
1943	Fired Wife	Oscar Blix	
1943	The Strange Death of Adolf Hitler	Herman Marbach	
1943	She's for Me	Phil Norwin	
1943	Moonlight in Vermont	Lionel Devereau	
1944	Resisting Enemy Interrogation	Capt. Volbricht	Uncredited
1944	In Society	Count Alexis	
1944	The Climax	Amato Roselli	
1944	Bowery to Broadway	George Henshaw	
1944	Enter Arsène Lupin	Dubose	
1945	Song of the Sarong	Kalo	
1945	Easy to Look At	Antonio	
1945	The Royal Mounted Rides Again	Constable 'Frenchy' Moselle	Serial
1946	Girl on the Spot	Leon Lorenz	
1946	Idea Girl	Wilfred Potts	
1946	Night in Paradise	Frigid Ambassador	
1947	Song of Scheherazade	Pierre, the Headwaiter	
1950	Vendetta	Lt. Orso Antonio della Rabia	
1952	My Cousin Rachel	Guido Rainaldi	
1953	Scared Stiff	Mr. Cortega	
1953	Wings of the Hawk	Col. Paco Ruiz	
1954	The Last Time I Saw Paris	Claude Matine	
1954	Sign of the Pagan	Emperor Theodosius	
1955	The Racers	Count Salem	
1955	A Bullet for Joey	Dr. Carl Macklin	
1955	The Purple Mask	Marcel Cadonal	
1957	The Sad Sack	Ali Mustapha	
1958	The Restless Gun	Peter VonGilsa	Episode "The Outlander"
1959	Timbuktu	Colonel Charles Dufort	
1961	Look in Any Window	Carlo	
1962	Four Horsemen of the Apocalypse	Gen. von Kleig	
