= Micky Dolenz =

American musician and actor (born 1945)

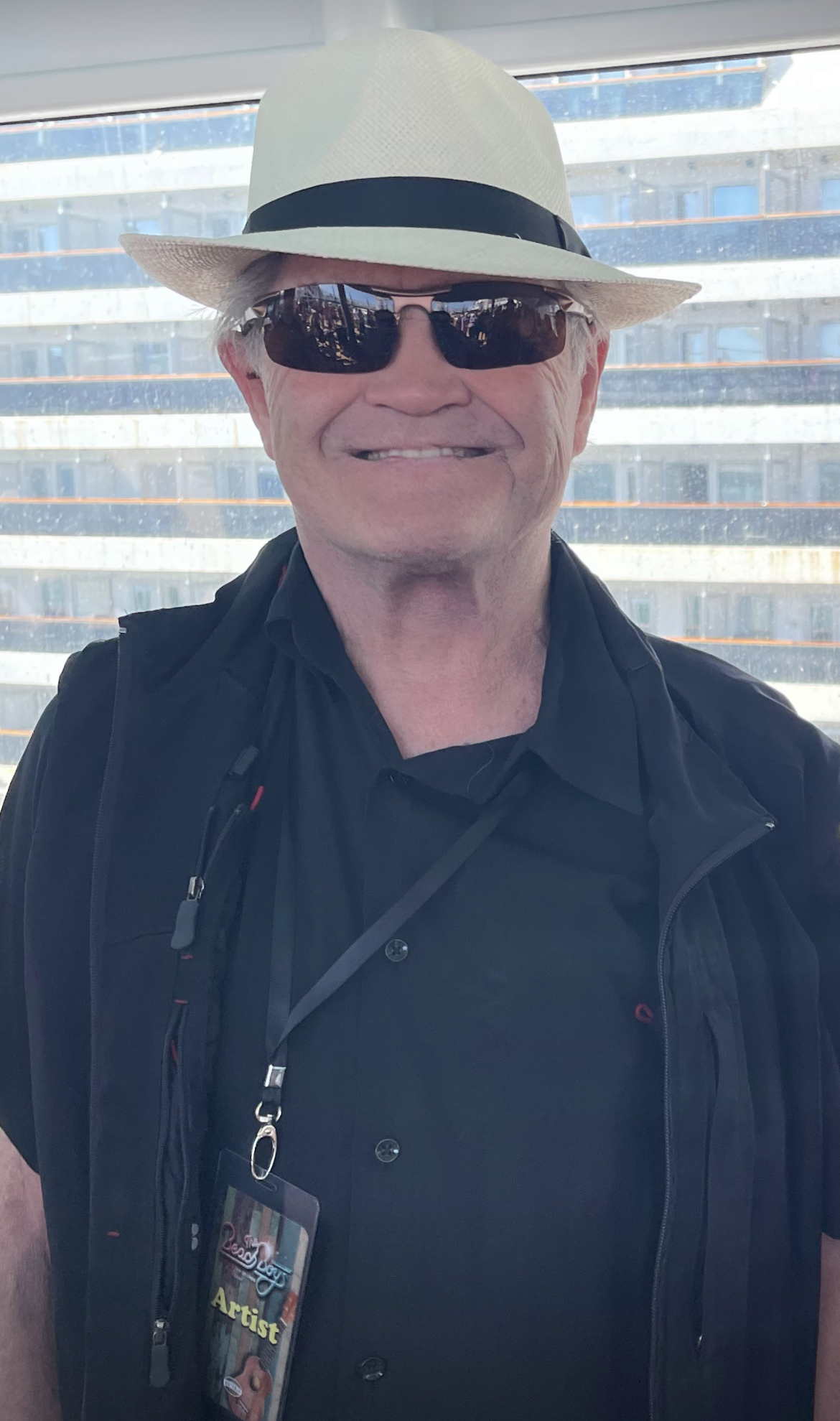
- Dolenz in 2022 on the Beach Boys cruise
- Born: George Michael Dolenz Jr. March 8, 1945 (age 81); Los Angeles, California, U.S.
- Other name: Mickey Braddock
- Occupations: Musician; actor; singer; TV producer; businessman
- Years active: 1956–present
- Spouses: Samantha Juste (m. 1968; div. 1975); Trina Dow (m. 1977; div. 1991); Donna Quinter (m. 2002)
- Children: 4, including Ami Bluebell Dolenz
- Parents: George Dolenz; Janelle Johnson
- Musical career
- Genres: Rock; pop; pop rock; psychedelic rock
- Instruments: Vocals; drums; guitar; keyboards
- Formerly of: The Monkees, Dolenz, Jones, Boyce & Hart
- Website: mickydolenz.com

George Michael Dolenz Jr. (/ˈdoʊlənz/ DOH-lənz; born March 8, 1945) is an American musician, singer, and actor. He was one of two primary vocalists for the Monkees (1966–1970, as well as for reunions until 2021), and a co-star of the Emmy-winning TV sitcom The Monkees (1966–1968). Although billed as the drummer, he sang lead vocals on the majority of the Monkees studio recordings and only developed drumming skills after the Monkees' second LP.

Dolenz is the last surviving member of the group, following the deaths of Davy Jones in 2012, Peter Tork in 2019, and Michael Nesmith in 2021.

== Early life and career ==
Dolenz was born on March 8, 1945, at the Cedars of Lebanon Hospital in Hollywood, the son of actors George Dolenz and Janelle Johnson. He has three sisters, Gemma Marie ("Coco"), Deborah, and Kathleen ("Gina"). Gemma's nickname, Coco, is a shortened form of "Coco Sunshine", a nickname given to her as a child by Micky. Coco was a frequent guest on the set of The Monkees TV show and sometimes a guest performer on records by the Monkees, singing background vocals or duetting with Micky. She often performs as a member of Micky's backing band during his concerts.

Dolenz suffered from Perthes disease as a child, affecting his hip joint and right leg, leaving that leg weaker (and shorter) than the other. This resulted in Dolenz adapting an unorthodox drum setup – right-handed and left-footed – in his musical career.

=== Circus Boy ===
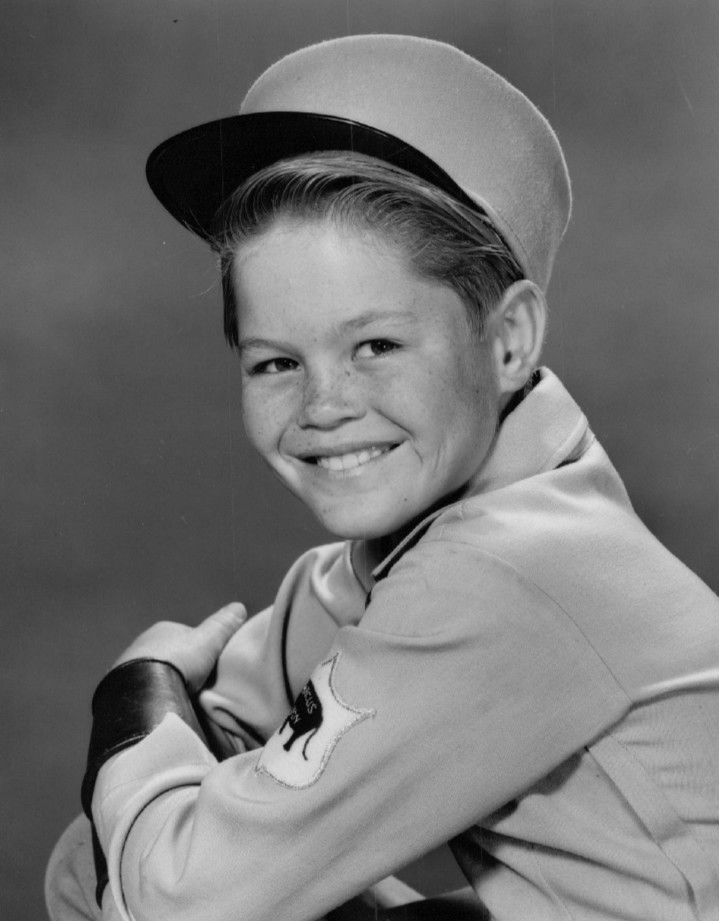
Dolenz as Corky

Dolenz began his show-business career in 1956 when he starred in a children's TV show called Circus Boy under the name Mickey Braddock. He played Corky, an orphaned water boy for the elephants in a one-ring circus at the start of the 20th century. The program ran for two seasons, after which Dolenz made sporadic appearances on network television shows and pursued his education. Dolenz went to Ulysses S. Grant High School in Valley Glen and graduated in 1962. In 1964, he was cast as Ed in the episode "Born of Kings and Angels" of the NBC education drama series Mr. Novak, starring James Franciscus as an idealistic Los Angeles teacher. Dolenz was attending college in Los Angeles when he was hired for the "drummer" role in NBC's The Monkees.

== Career ==
=== Early musical career ===
Dolenz originally had his own rock band called "Micky and the One-Nighters" in the early- to mid-1960s with himself as lead singer. He had already begun writing his own songs. According to Dolenz, his band's live stage act included rock songs, cover songs, and some R&B. One of his favorite songs to sing was Chuck Berry's "Johnny B. Goode", which he sang at his Monkees audition, resulting in his being hired as one of the cast/band members. He recorded two 45s in 1965 that went unreleased until the Monkees' success in 1967. Issued on the Challenge label, the recordings were "Don't Do It" b/w "Plastic Symphony III" and "Huff Puff" b/w "Fate (Big Ben)". Neither B-side on the Challenge 45s is by Dolenz, but rather a band later credited as The Obvious.

=== The Monkees ===
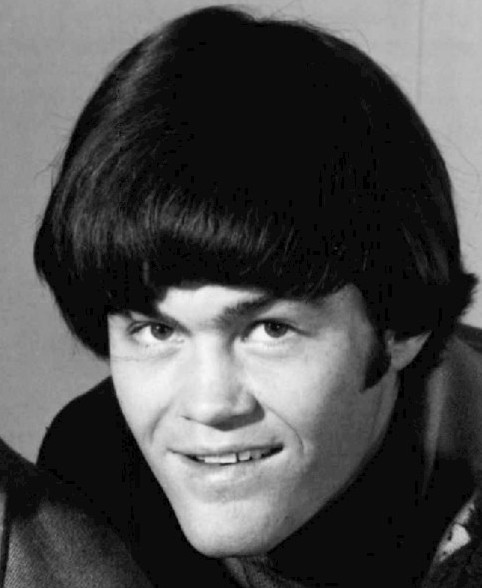
Dolenz at a 1966 Monkees photoshoot

In 1965, Dolenz was cast in the television sitcom The Monkees and became the drummer and a lead vocalist in the band created for the show. Tommy Boyce and Bobby Hart, writers of many of the Monkees' songs, observed quickly that when brought into the studio together, the four actors would try to make each other laugh. Because of this, the writers often brought in each singer individually. The antics escalated until Dolenz poured a cup of ice on Don Kirshner's head. At the time, Dolenz did not know Kirshner on sight.

During tension-filled times, Mike Nesmith and Peter Tork voluntarily turned over lead vocal duties to Dolenz on their own songs.

Dolenz wrote a few of the band's songs, most prominently "Randy Scouse Git" from the album Headquarters. He provided the lead vocals for such hits as "Last Train to Clarksville", "Pleasant Valley Sunday", and "I'm a Believer".

Dolenz purchased the third modular Moog synthesizer sold commercially. (The first two belonged to Wendy Carlos and Buck Owens.) His performance on the Monkees' song "Daily Nightly" (written by Nesmith), from the album Pisces, Aquarius, Capricorn & Jones Ltd., was one of the first uses of the synthesizer on a rock recording. He eventually sold his instrument to Bobby Sherman.

He is the last surviving member of the Monkees (after Davy Jones's death in 2012, Tork's in 2019, and Nesmith's in 2021).

=== Solo MGM recordings ===
The Moog synthesizer that Dolenz had bought proved vital when he wrote a song entitled "Easy on You" in 1971; he began recording it in his home studio, playing acoustic guitar and drums, and using the Moog like a keyboard. With that song completed, he next invited former Monkee Peter Tork over to help with more recordings. Then, a fortuitous street encounter led to former Monkee stand-in David Price joining, as well as contributing a rock song he had written called "Oh Someone". With Dolenz on drums and vocals, Tork on bass, and Price on rhythm guitar, the song was completed in only two hours; subsequently, guitarist B. J. Jones came in two days later and added lead guitar. With these two songs recorded, Dolenz contacted his former high school friend Mike Curb, then the head of MGM Records; after playing the songs for Curb, Dolenz was immediately signed to MGM.

Dolenz recorded and released songs for MGM for about three years (with a few of the songs being credited to Starship, an ersatz group, not the later Jefferson Starship). After the first year, Dolenz's friend Harry Nilsson contributed his song "Daybreak", also arranging and producing the recording, which included Keith Allison on guitar, former Monkees producer Chip Douglas on bass, and steel-guitarist Orville "Red" Rhodes.

By early 1974, with no chart successes to date, Dolenz headed to England, and with Tony Scotti, he cut four songs for MGM: two rock classics, "Splish Splash" and "Purple People Eater", as well as "I Hate Rock and Roll" and a new song, "Wing Walker". Meanwhile, Mike Curb left MGM and joined Warner Bros. Records. Dolenz's association with MGM then ended (and those final four songs remained unreleased).

=== Dolenz, Jones, Boyce & Hart ===
In part because of reruns of The Monkees on Saturday mornings and in syndication, The Monkees Greatest Hits charted in 1976. The LP, issued by Arista (a subsidiary of Columbia Pictures), was actually a repackaging of a 1972 compilation LP called Re-Focus that had been issued by Arista's previous label imprint, Bell Records, also owned by Columbia Pictures.

Dolenz and Jones took advantage of this, joining ex-Monkees songwriters Tommy Boyce and Bobby Hart to tour the United States. They could not use the Monkees name for legal reasons, but from 1975 to 1977, as the "Golden Hits of The Monkees" show ("The Guys Who Wrote 'Em and the Guys Who Sang 'Em!"), they successfully performed in smaller venues such as state fairs and amusement parks, as well as making stops in Japan, Thailand, and Singapore. They also released an album of new material, appropriately called Dolenz, Jones, Boyce & Hart, and a live album, Concert in Japan, was released by Capitol in 1976.

A Christmas single (credited to Dolenz, Jones and Tork) was produced by Chip Douglas and released on his own label in 1976. The single featured Douglas's and Howard Kaylan's "Christmas Is My Time of Year" (originally recorded by a 1960s supergroup, The Christmas Spirit), with a B-side of Irving Berlin's "White Christmas" (Douglas released a remixed version of the single, with additional overdubbed instruments, in 1986). Tork also joined Dolenz, Jones, Boyce & Hart on stage at Disneyland on July 4, 1976, and also joined Dolenz and Jones on stage at the Starwood in Hollywood, California in 1977.

=== After Monkees television and film career ===
After The Monkees television show ended, Dolenz continued performing providing voice-overs for a number of Saturday-morning cartoon series including The Funky Phantom, Partridge Family 2200 A.D., The Scooby-Doo Show, Butch Cassidy and the Sundance Kids, These Are the Days, Devlin, and Wonder Wheels (from The Skatebirds).

In 1972, Dolenz played Vance in the murder mystery film Night of the Strangler. He was featured in an episode of Adam-12, entitled "Dirt Duel" (season 5, episode 1), and an episode of Cannon, entitled "Bitter Legion" (season 2, episode 3).

Both Dolenz and Michael Nesmith auditioned for the role of Arthur "The Fonz" Fonzarelli on Happy Days. Dolenz was reportedly a finalist for the role.

In 1975, Dolenz acted in Linda Lovelace for President, starring Linda Lovelace.

In the early 1970s, Dolenz became a member of the Hollywood Vampires drinking club, founded by rock singer Alice Cooper. He also played as a member of their softball league, alongside Davy Jones.

=== MTV reignites Monkee Mania ===
In 1986, a screening of the entire Monkees television series by MTV led to renewed interest in the band, followed by a single, "That Was Then, This Is Now", which reached No. 20 on the Billboard Hot 100 in the U.S. and No.41 in Canada, a 20th-anniversary tour, a greatest hits album, and a brand new LP, Pool It! in 1987. The band's original albums were reissued, and all hit the record charts at the same time.

Beginning in 1986, Dolenz joined the other ex-Monkees for several reunion tours and toured extensively as a solo artist.

=== WCBS-FM DJ ===
On January 10, 2005, Dolenz replaced Dan Taylor as the morning disc jockey at oldies radio station WCBS-FM in New York. On June 3, 2005, Dolenz celebrated his 100th show with a special morning show at B. B. King's. That was also his last regular show at the station; at 5:00 pm, WCBS-FM announced that the station would replace its oldies format with a "Jack" format, eliminating the need for on-air disc jockeys.

However, WCBS-FM eventually returned to its oldies format on July 12, 2007, with Taylor re-assuming his role as the morning disc jockey the following day. Several months later, on February 3, 2008, Dolenz was invited back to the station to present his long-postponed 101st show and final in-studio appearance there by guest-hosting a three-hour broadcast during WCBS's Sunday evening "New York Radio Greats" program.

=== Solo work and further Monkees reunions ===
In 2009, Dolenz signed a deal to record an album of the classic songs of Carole King, titled King for a Day. The album (released on Gigitone Records) was produced by Jeffrey Foskett, who has worked extensively with Brian Wilson and played on Wilson's 2004 Grammy-winning Brian Wilson Presents Smile. King's songs "Pleasant Valley Sunday", "Sometime in the Morning", and "Porpoise Song" (Theme from Head) have emerged as signature songs from the Monkees. As of February 2010, he was appearing on stage in London in Hairspray with Michael Ball. The show also went on tour and had a successful run in Dublin, Ireland, during November 2010. In 2011, he rejoined Tork and Jones for An Evening with The Monkees: The 45th Anniversary Tour.

After Jones' sudden death in February 2012, Dolenz and Tork reunited with Michael Nesmith for a 12-concert tour of the United States as a tribute. The three remaining Monkees toured again in 2013 and 2014 and Dolenz toured as a duo with Tork in 2015 and 2016.

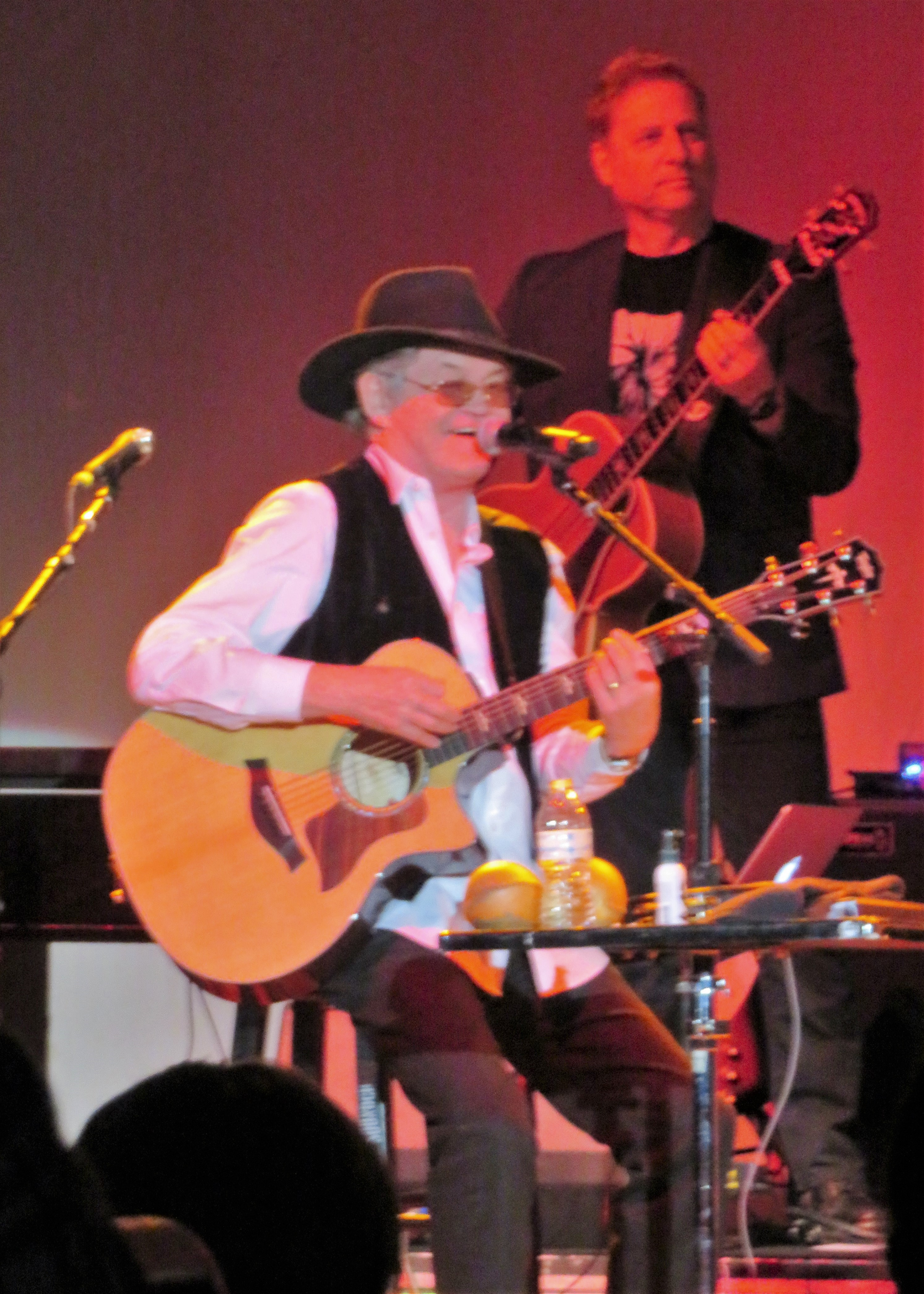
Dolenz performing in 2019

Following Tork's death in 2019, Dolenz toured with Nesmith as "The Mike and Micky Show" in 2018 and 2019. On May 4, 2021, Dolenz and Nesmith announced "The Monkees Farewell Tour" which was the last for the group. The tour consisted of 40 US dates from September to November. The final show was held on November 14, 2021, at the Greek Theatre in Los Angeles.

On May 21, 2021, Dolenz released a solo album, Dolenz Sings Nesmith, featuring songs written by Nesmith and produced by Christian Nesmith.

On November 3, 2023 Dolenz released an EP of R.E.M. cover songs.

=== Other tours ===
In late 2019, Dolenz toured with Todd Rundgren, Jason Scheff, Christopher Cross, and Joey Molland of Badfinger, in celebration of the Beatles' White Album on the "It Was Fifty Years Ago Today – A Tribute to the Beatles' White Album" tour. Dolenz performed the Monkees' songs "I'm a Believer" and "Pleasant Valley Sunday".

=== Later acting career ===
In 1994–95, Dolenz played in two episodes of the sitcom Boy Meets World; in the first one (entitled "Band on the Run"), he played Norm, a bandmate of Alan Matthews. In 1995, he joined Davy Jones and Peter Tork in episode eight of the third season (entitled "Rave On"), although they did not play the Monkees, per se: their characters are named Gordy (Dolenz), Reginald Fairfield (Jones) and Jedidiah Lawrence (Tork). However, at the climax of the program, the three are put on stage together and perform the classic Buddy Holly song "Not Fade Away", and the Temptations' "My Girl". As an inside joke, actor Dave Madden, who had played the manager on The Partridge Family, cameoed as a manager; he suddenly appears, wanting to handle the "new" group, and tells them that they "could be bigger than The Beatles", which they all scoff at.

In 1995, he played a talent contest judge in The Brady Bunch Movie, alongside Peter Tork and Davy Jones.

In 2007, he appeared in Rob Zombie's remake of Halloween as Derek Allan, the owner of a gun shop.

On January 29, 2011, Dolenz appeared in the Syfy Channel film Mega Python vs. Gatoroid, alongside Debbie Gibson and Tiffany. On February 21, 2015, he had a cameo as himself in the Adult Swim TV special Bagboy. In 2017, he appeared as himself on the sitcom Difficult People.

=== Directorial work ===
In 1980, Dolenz produced and directed the British television sitcom Metal Mickey, featuring a large metallic robot with the catch-phrase "boogie boogie". In 1981, he directed a short film based on the sketch "Balham, Gateway to the South", with Robbie Coltrane playing multiple roles. In the early 1980s, Dolenz directed a stage adaptation of Bugsy Malone. He was producer of the TV show Luna in 1983–84.

=== Stage work ===
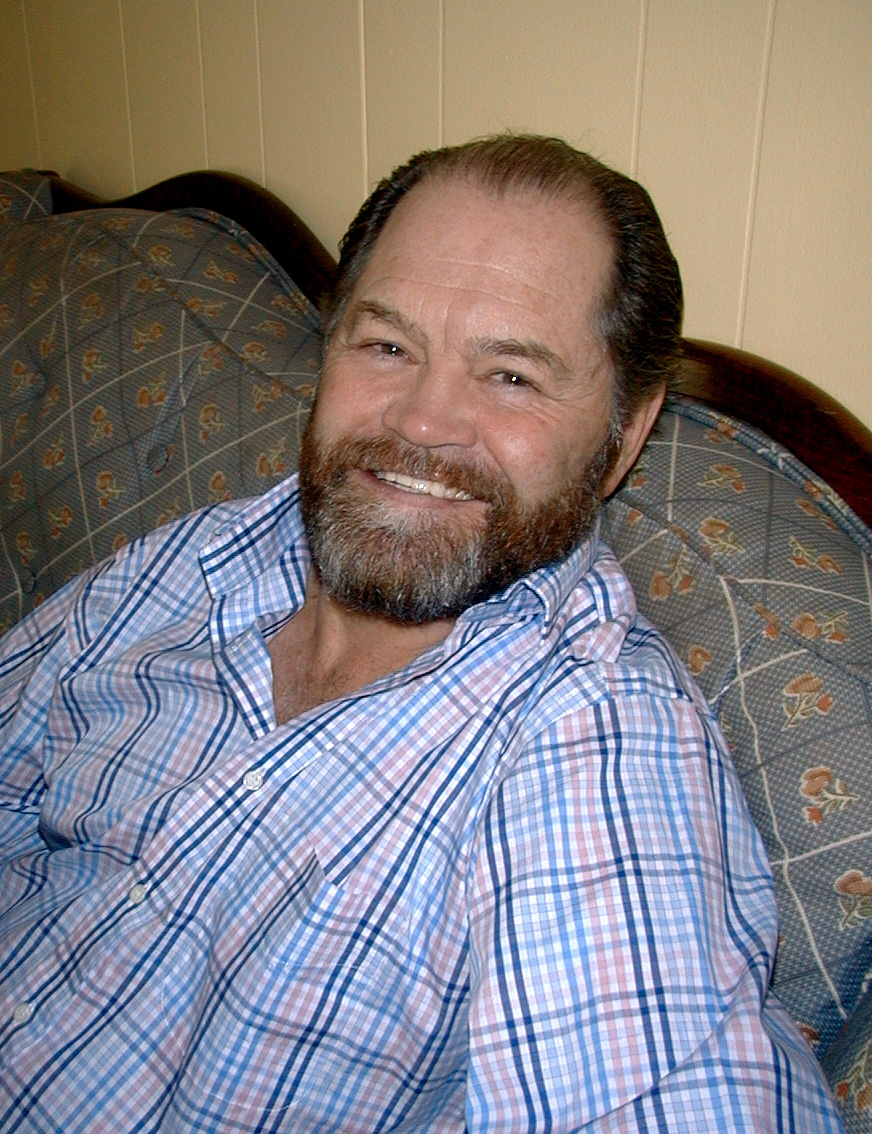
Dolenz, with beard grown out for role as King Charlemagne in Pippin at the Goodspeed Opera House.

In 1977, he performed with former bandmate Davy Jones in a stage production of the Harry Nilsson musical The Point! at London's Mermaid Theatre, playing and singing the part of the "Count's Kid" and the Leafman to Jones's starring role as Oblio (according to the CD booklet). An original cast recording was made and released. The comedic chemistry of Dolenz and Jones proved so strong that the show was revived in 1978 with Nilsson inserting additional comedy for the two, plus two more songs, with one of them ("Gotta Get Up") being sung by Dolenz and Jones together. The show was considered successful enough that another revival was planned for 1979, but it proved cost-prohibitive. After the show's run, Dolenz remained in England and began directing for stage and television, as well as producing several of the shows he directed.

From August to September 2006, Dolenz played Charlemagne at the Goodspeed Opera House for the revival of the musical Pippin in East Haddam, Connecticut. He also toured in that role. Also in the mid-2000s, Dolenz played the role of Zoser in the Broadway production of Elton John and Tim Rice's Aida.

== Personal life ==
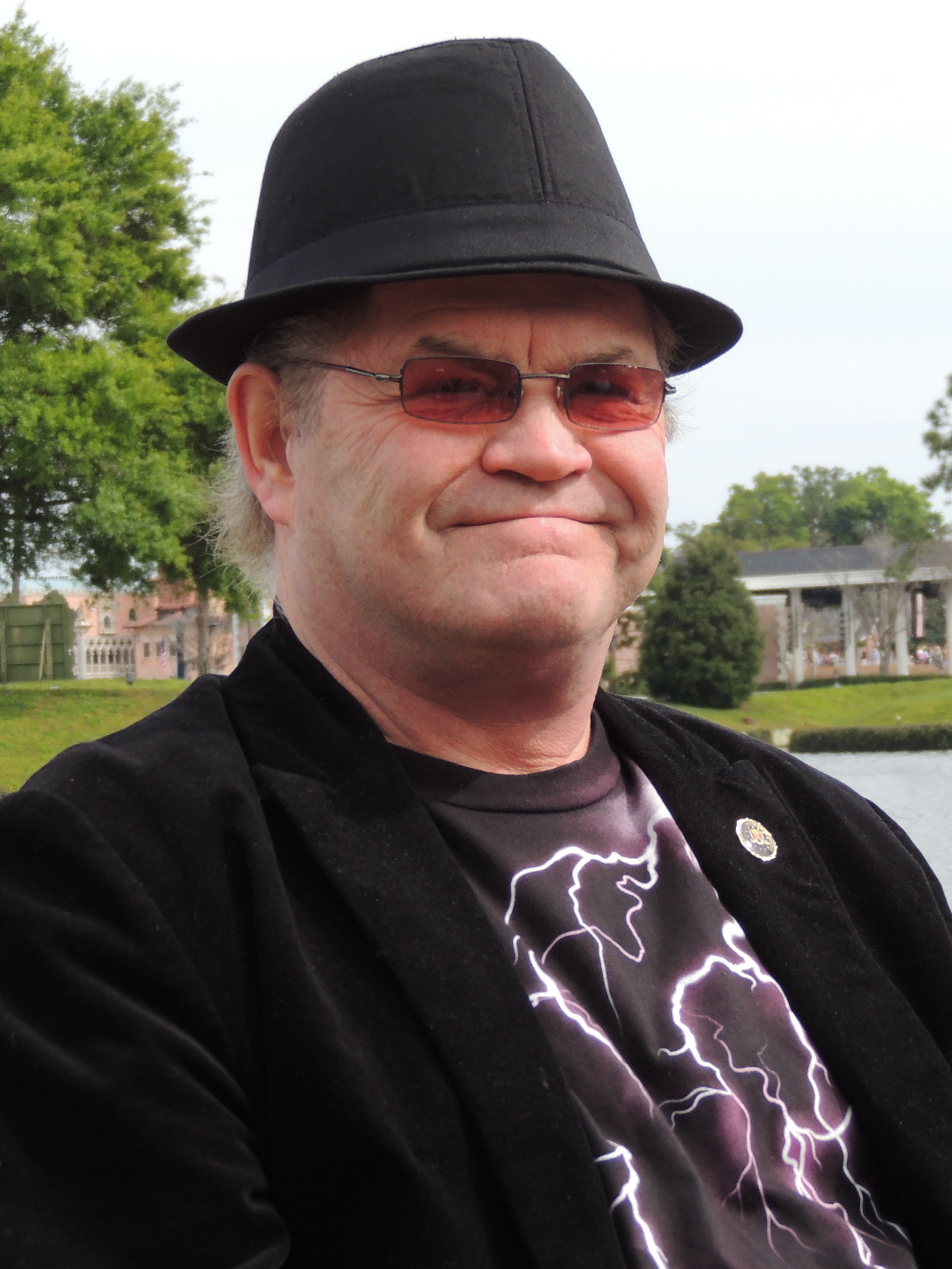
Dolenz in 2013

Dolenz has been married three times and is the father of four daughters. In 1967, while in the UK on tour with the Monkees, Dolenz met future wife Samantha Juste, a co-presenter on BBC TV's pop music show Top of the Pops. They married in 1968, and their daughter Ami Bluebell Dolenz was born on January 8, 1969; she became an actress who was particularly active in the 1980s and 1990s. Dolenz and Juste divorced in 1975, but remained close friends until her death following a stroke on February 5, 2014.

He married Trina Dow in 1977. They had three daughters: Charlotte Janelle (born August 8, 1981), Emily Claire (born July 25, 1983), and Georgia Rose (born September 3, 1984). They divorced in 1991. Trina Dow Dolenz has become a couples therapist, still using her married name.

Dolenz married his third wife, Donna Quinter, in 2002.

== Discography ==
Albums

- Dolenz, Jones, Boyce & Hart (Capitol, 1976) – with Dolenz, Jones, Boyce & Hart
- Concert in Japan (Capitol, 1976) – live, with Dolenz, Jones, Boyce & Hart
- The Point! (MCA, 1977) – with the London cast of The Point! (MCA Records – VIM 6262; CD release 2016, Varèse Sarabande)
- Micky Dolenz Puts You to Sleep (Kid Rhino, 1991)
- Broadway Micky (Kid Rhino, 1994)
- Demoiselle (self-released, 1998)
- King for a Day (Gigatone, 2010)
- Remember (Robo, 2012)
- A Little Bit Broadway, a Little Bit Rock and Roll (Broadway, 2015) – live
- An Evening With Peter Noone & Micky Dolenz (7A Records, 2016) – spoken word, live
- The MGM Singles Collection – Expanded CD Edition (7A Records, 2016)
- Out of Nowhere (7A Records, 2017)
- Live in Japan (7A Records, 2020)
- Dolenz Sings Nesmith (7A Records, 2021) – produced by Christian Nesmith
- Demoiselle (7A Records, 2022) – expanded deluxe edition
- Dolenz Sings R.E.M. (EP, 7a Records, 2023)

Singles

- "Don't Do It"/"Plastic Symphony III" (Challenge, 1967) (recorded in 1965) US No. 75 CAN No. 74
- "Huff Puff"/"Fate (Big Ben)" (Challenge, 1967) (recorded in 1965)
- "Do It in the Name of Love"/"Lady Jane" (Bell, 1971) – with Davy Jones
- "Easy on You"/"Oh Someone" (MGM, 1971)
- "A Lover's Prayer"/"Unattended in the Dungeon" (MGM, 1972)
- "Johnny B. Goode"/"It's Amazing to Me" (Lion, 1972) – with Starship
- "Daybreak"/"Love War" (Romar, 1973)
- "The Buddy Holly Tribute"/"Ooh, She's Young" (Romar, 1974)
- "I Remember the Feeling"/"You and I" (Capitol, 1975) – with Dolenz, Jones, Boyce & Hart
- "I Love You and I'm Glad That I Said It"/"Saving My Love for You" (Capitol, 1975) – with Dolenz, Jones, Boyce & Hart
- "Christmas Is My Time of Year"/"White Christmas" (Harmony, 1976) – with Davy Jones & Peter Tork
- "Lovelight"/"Alicia" (Chrysalis, 1979)
- "To Be or Not to Be"/"Beverly Hills" (JAM, 1981)
- "Tomorrow"/"Fat Sam's Grand Slam" (A&M, 1983) – with the Bugsy Malone Gang
- "Chance of a Lifetime"/"Livin' on Lies" (7A Records, 2016)
- "Porpoise Song"/"Good Morning Good Morning"/"Crying in the Rain"/"Randy Scouse Git" (7A Records, 2016) – with Christian Nesmith and Circe Link
- "Sunny Girlfriend"/"Zor and Zam" (Live in Japan, 1982) (7A Records, 2016)

== Filmography ==
=== Film ===
| Year | Title | Role | Notes |
|---|---|---|---|
| 1967 | Good Times | Jungle Gino | uncredited role |
| 1968 | Head | Micky | uncredited writer |
| 1972 | Night of the Strangler | Vance | |
| 1975 | Linda Lovelace for President | Lt. Fenwick | |
| 1975 | Keep Off My Grass! | You Know | |
| 1993 | Deadfall | Bart | |
| 1999 | Invisible Mom II | Bernard | |
| 2001 | Malpractice | | director |
| 2007 | Halloween | Derek Allen | |
| 2011 | Mega Python vs. Gatoroid | Himself | |

=== Television ===
| Year | Title | Role | Notes |
|---|---|---|---|
| 1956–1957 | Circus Boy | Corky | main cast; 49 episodes (as Mickey Braddock) |
| 1958 | Zane Grey Theater | Ted Matson | Episode: "The Vaunted" (as Mickey Braddock) |
| 1959 | Playhouse 90 | Melvin | Episode: "The Velvet Alley" (as Micky Braddock) |
| 1964 | Mr. Novak | Ed | Episode: "Born of Kings and Angels" (as Micky Braddock) |
| 1965 | Peyton Place | Kitch Brunner | 3 episodes |
| 1966–1968 | The Monkees | Micky / Robot Micky / "Baby Face" Morales | main cast; 58 episodes; writer/director – episode: "Mijacogeo" |
| 1966 | The Monkees: "I'm a Believer" | Micky Dolenz | music video |
| 1967 | The Monkees: "Daydream Believer" | Micky Dolenz | music video |
| 1969 | 33 1/3 Revolutions Per Monkee | Micky Dolenz | Television film |
| 1969 | The Glen Campbell Goodtime Hour | Micky Dolenz | Episode: "Jeannie C. Riley & The Monkees"; guest performer |
| 1969 | Rowan & Martin's Laugh-In | Micky Dolenz | Episode #3.4; guest performer |
| 1972 | The Funky Phantom | Skip Gilroy | Voice; 17 episodes |
| 1972 | My Three Sons | John Simpson / Brian Lipsker | Episode: "Barbara Lost" |
| 1972 | Adam-12 | Oiler | Episode: "Dirt Duel" |
| 1972 | Cannon | Cappy | Episode: "Bitter Legion" |
| 1973 | Butch Cassidy and the Sun Dance Kids | Wally | Voice |
| 1973 | Owen Marshall, Counselor at Law | Rick Schenk | Episode: "The Camerons Are a Special Clan" |
| 1974 | Partridge Family 2200 A.D. | | Voice |
| 1974 | These Are the Days | | Voice |
| 1975 | Devlin | Tod Devlin | Voice |
| 1976 | The Scooby-Doo Show | Alex Super | Voice; episode: "Mamba Wamba & the Voodoo Hoodoo" |
| 1977 | Wonder Wheels | Willie Wheeler | Voice |
| 1977–1980 | Captain Caveman and the Teen Angels | Additional voices | 38 episodes |
| 1979 | Pop Gospel | | director; 7 episodes |
| 1979 | Premiere | | director – episode: "Story Without a Hero" |
| 1980–1983 | Metal Mickey | | producer, 39 episodes (as Michael Dolenz); director, 21 episodes (as Michael Dolenz) |
| 1981 | The Box | | Short; writer/director (as Michael Dolenz) |
| 1981 | Gateway to the South | | Short; director (as Michael Dolenz) |
| 1982 | Murphy's Mob | | director |
| 1983 | No Problem! | | producer; director, 6 episodes |
| 1983 | For 4 Tonight | | producer, 6 episodes; director, 6 episodes |
| 1983–1984 | Luna | | creator/writer, 12 episodes; producer, 12 episodes; director, 3 episodes (as Michael Dolenz) |
| 1985 | Television Parts | | Television film, also director |
| 1985 | From the Top | | producer, 6 episodes; composer, 12 episodes |
| 1986 | The Monkees: "That Was Then, This Is Now" | Micky Dolenz | music video |
| 1987 | The New Mike Hammer | Scott Warren | Episode: "Deadly Collection" |
| 1987 | The Monkees: "Heart and Soul" | Micky Dolenz | music video |
| 1988 | The Monkees: "Every Step of the Way" | Micky Dolenz | music video |
| 1990 | Aladdin | | Television film; director |
| 1992 | Batman: The Animated Series | Min / Max | Voice; episode: "Two-Face Part II" |
| 1992 | The Ben Stiller Show | Josh Goldsilver | Episode: "With Rob Morrow" |
| 1994 | Monty | Eli Campbell | Episode: "My Dad Could Beat Up Your Dad" |
| 1995 | Aaahh!!! Real Monsters | Jed / Kilowog | Voice; episode: "Simon Strikes Back/The Ickis Box" |
| 1994–1995 | The Tick | Arthur / Arthur Clone / Captain Lemming | Voice; 13 episodes |
| 1994–1995 | Boy Meets World | Gordy / Norm | 2 episodes; director, 2 episodes |
| 1996 | Pacific Blue | Mayor Micky Dolenz | 2 episodes; director – episode: "Moving Target" |
| 1996 | Muppets Tonight | Himself in cameo | 1 episode: "Cindy Crawford" |
| 1996 | PJ & Duncan: "Stepping Stone" | Motorist | music video |
| 1997 | Hey, Hey, It's the Monkees | Micky | Television film; also executive producer |
| 1997 | The Wonderful World of Disney | Donny Shotz | Episode: "The Love Bug" |
| 1998–1999 | The Secret Files of the Spy Dogs | Ralph / Scribble | Voice |
| 2001 | The Drew Carey Show | Mr. Metcalf | Episode: "Drew and the King" |
| 2002 | As the World Turns | The Vicar | Episode #1.11769 |
| 2011 | Mega Python vs. Gatoroid | Micky Dolenz | Television film |
| 2015 | Bagboy | Micky Dolenz | Television film; uncredited |
| 2017 | Mighty Magiswords | Wendell the Love Grub | Voice; episode: "The Saga of Robopiggeh!" |
| 2017 | Difficult People | Micky Dolenz | Episode: "Fuzz Buddies" |

== Stage ==
- 1977–1978: The Point!, Mermaid Theatre, London, England (Role: Count's Kid / The Leafman)
- 1983: Bugsy Malone, Her Majesty's Theatre, London, England (director)
- 1994–1998: Grease, Eugene O'Neill Theatre, NYC (Role: Vince Fontaine – replacement)
- 2004: Aida, Palace Theatre, NYC (Role: Zoser – replacement)
- 2006: Pippin, Goodspeed Opera House, East Haddam, Connecticut (Role: Charlemagne)
- 2010: Hairspray, Grand Canal Theatre, Dublin, Ireland (Role: Wilbur Turnblad – alternate)
