= Barbie Rewind =

2026 video game compilation

- Developer: Digital Eclipse
- Publisher: Atari
- Composers: Chipzel; Gina Loughlin; Leiss Hoffman; Megan McDuffee; Samantha van der Sluis; Tori Roberts
- Series: Barbie
- Platforms: Nintendo Switch; Nintendo Switch 2; PlayStation 4; PlayStation 5; Windows; Xbox One; Xbox Series X/S
- Release: Nintendo Switch, PlayStation 4, PlayStation 5, Windows, Xbox One, Xbox Series X/S: WW: November 12, 2026; Nintendo Switch 2: NA: November 12, 2026; EU: November 18, 2026
- Genres: Platform, Action, Sports
- Mode: Single-player

Barbie Rewind is a 2026 video game compilation developed by Digital Eclipse and published by Atari. It contains 16 different Barbie games originally released between 1991 and 2007, as well as a previously unreleased Barbie game. The compilation was released in November 2026 for the Nintendo Switch, Nintendo Switch 2, PlayStation 4, PlayStation 5, Windows, Xbox One, and Xbox Series X/S.

== Contents ==
Barbie Rewind contains 16 different Barbie video games released between 1991 and 2007, as well as the previously unreleased Barbie: Vacation Adventure for Super NES and Sega Genesis. The collection's main interface is set within the DreamHouse, which the player can customize using over 250 different pieces of furniture and decor. Completing objectives given by Barbie and her friends unlocks additional decorations. A "digital lookbook" features images from throughout Barbie's history.

=== Games ===
The following games are featured in Barbie Rewind:

- Barbie (1991, NES)
- Barbie: Game Girl (1992, Game Boy)
- Barbie: Super Model (1993, Genesis/SNES)
- Barbie: Vacation Adventure (Unreleased, Genesis/SNES)
- Barbie: Race & Ride (1999, PS1)
- Barbie Super Sports (1999, PS1)
- Adventures with Barbie: Ocean Discovery (1999, GBC)
- Detective Barbie: The Mystery Cruise (2000, PS1)
- Barbie Fashion Pack Games (2000, GBC)
- Barbie: Pet Rescue (2001, GBC)
- Secret Agent Barbie: Royal Jewels Mission (2002, GBA)
- Barbie: Groovy Games (2002, GBA)
- Barbie: Gotta Have Games (2003, PS1)
- Barbie Horse Adventures: Blue Ribbon Race (2003, GBA)
- The Barbie Diaries: High School Mystery (2006, GBA)
- Barbie in the 12 Dancing Princesses (2006, GBA)
- Barbie as the Island Princess (2007, GBA)

== Release ==
Barbie Rewind was announced by Digital Eclipse and Atari on June 6, 2026. The game was released on November 12, 2026, for the Nintendo Switch, Nintendo Switch 2, PlayStation 4, PlayStation 5, Windows, Xbox One, and Xbox Series X/S. While the Switch 2 version was released in North America and select Asian territories on launch, it was released the following week in other regions on the 18th.

A physical release for the PlayStation 5 and Nintendo Switch was also released. A limited edition version includes a poster and a Barbie doll wearing an Atari-branded outfit.
