= List of Barbie video games =

Video game

- Selection of Barbie video games released for PC in the 1990s.
- Series: Barbie
- Platforms: Commodore (1984); Nintendo (1991-2025); Microsoft (1991-2025); Sega (1993); Macintosh (1994-2004); PlayStation (1999-2025); Xbox (2003-2025); Android (2015-2023); iOS (2015-2023)
- Genres: Action; Adventure; Educational entertainment; Simulation; Sports

Release timeline
1984	Barbie
1985
1986
1987
1988
1989
1990
1991	Barbie
1991	Barbie PC Fashion Design & Color
1992	Barbie: Game Girl
1993	Barbie: Super Model
1994	Barbie and Her Magical House
1995
1996	Barbie Fashion Designer
1997	Barbie Storymaker
1997	Barbie Magic Hair Styler
1997	Adventures with Barbie: Ocean Discovery (PC)
1997	Magic Fairy Tales: Barbie as Rapunzel
1998	Barbie Nail Designer
1998	Detective Barbie in the Mystery of the Carnival Caper
1998	Barbie Riding Club
1999	Adventures with Barbie: Ocean Discovery (GBC)
1999	Working Woman Barbie
1999	Detective Barbie 2: The Vacation Mystery
1999	Barbie: Race & Ride
1999	Barbie Generation Girl: Gotta Groove
1999	Barbie as Sleeping Beauty
1999	Barbie Super Sports (PS1)
2000	Barbie: Pet Rescue
2000	Barbie as Princess Bride
2000	Barbie Magic Genie Bottle
2000	Barbie Fashion Pack Games
2000	Barbie: Magic Genie Adventure
2000	Detective Barbie: The Mystery Cruise
2001	Barbie Super Sports (PC)
2001	Barbie: Pet Rescue (GBC)
2001	Secret Agent Barbie
2001	Barbie Explorer (PS1)
2001	Barbie Team Gymnastics
2001	Barbie Beach Vacation
2002	Barbie Beauty Styler
2002	Barbie Explorer (PC)
2002	Barbie as Rapunzel: A Creative Adventure
2002	Barbie: Groovy Games
2002	Secret Agent Barbie: Royal Jewel Mission
2002	Barbie Sparkling Ice Show
2003	Barbie Beauty Boutique
2003	Barbie Horse Adventures: Blue Ribbon Race
2003	Barbie Horse Adventures: Mystery Ride
2003	Barbie Horse Adventures: Wild Horse Rescue
2003	Barbie of Swan Lake: The Enchanted Forest
2004	Barbie Mermaid Adventure
2004	Barbie Fashion Show
2004	Barbie as the Princess and the Pauper
2005	Barbie and the Magic of Pegasus (PC)
2005	Barbie and the Magic of Pegasus (GBA)
2005	Barbie in The 12 Dancing Princesses (GBA)
2006	Barbie in The 12 Dancing Princesses (PC/PS2)
2006	The Barbie Diaries: High School Mystery (GBA)
2007	Barbie as the Island Princess (GBA/DS)
2007	Barbie as the Island Princess (PS2/Wii/PC)
2007	BarbieGirls.com
2008	Barbie Fashion Show: An Eye for Style
2008	Barbie Horse Adventures: Riding Camp (PS2/Wii/PC)
2008	Barbie Horse Adventures: Riding Camp (DS)
2009	Barbie and the Three Musketeers
2010	Barbie: Groom and Glam Pups (DS/Wii)
2011	Barbie: Jet, Set & Style!
2012
2013	Barbie: Groom and Glam Pups (3DS)
2013	Barbie Dreamhouse Party
2014	Barbie Magical Fashion
2015	Barbie Superstar! Music Maker
2015	Barbie & Her Sisters: Puppy Rescue
2016	Barbie: Dreamtopia - Magical Hair
2016	Barbie Sparkle Blast
2017
2018	Barbie: Dreamhouse Adventures
2019
2020
2021
2022
2023	Barbie Color Creations
2023	Barbie DreamHouse Tycoon
2024	Barbie Project Friendship
2025	Barbie Horse Trails
2026	Barbie: Horse Ride & Rescue
2026	Barbie Rewind

Barbie, a fashion doll manufactured by American toy and entertainment company Mattel, has starred in numerous video games on PC, various console systems, IOS, and Android. Some games are adaptations of Barbie films or TV series, while others feature original storylines and concepts.

== History ==
=== Personal computers ===
==== Commodore 64 ====
The first Barbie game was also the only Barbie title to be released on Commodore 64. It was released in 1984 and developed by A. Eddy Goldfarb & Associates and published by Epyx. The concept behind the game was that it would serve as a "Computer Activity Toy", being non-structured and non-competitive. A video game for the Hot Wheels property was developed alongside Barbie. The self-titled debut game was a dress-up simulator. Players must dress Barbie for a specific type of date with Ken. Ken would then 'judge' Barbie's outfit, by either going ahead with the date, or rescheduling. The game featured 8-bit digitized audio, which was rare and difficult to implement on the Commodore 64 system.

==== Microsoft ====
The second Barbie game (1991), was the first Barbie title to be released on Microsoft's MS-DOS. In 1994, Mattel began to focus on releasing titles for Microsoft Windows (occasionally releasing Macintosh versions) and would not release another console title until 1999. Barbie's first adventure game, Adventures with Barbie: Ocean Discovery was released in 1997 for Microsoft Windows. Developed by Gorilla Systems, the game was financially successful – leading to further Barbie adventure games being commissioned by Mattel. Critics found the game's mentions of Barbie's marine biology degree was a "nod toward enlightenment" for the girl's game genre. Windows games have continued to be released until present day, with the most recent being 2025's Barbie Horse Trails.

=== Consoles ===
==== Nintendo ====
The first title to release on a Nintendo console was Barbie (1991), on the Nintendo Entertainment System (NES). It was the only Barbie game released for the console. The objective for the publisher and developer was to create an NES game that appealed to girls, as video games were seen as primarily masculine at the time. The team at Imagineering conceptualised a Mario-style platformer, where Barbie would progress through levels and fight bosses. Despite the 1984 game being criticised for sexist themes, including encouraging passive behaviour, Mattel was unwilling to let them animate Barbie in any way they considered "unladylike" or unflattering – meaning she could not jump on or directly fight enemies, she could not "die", and she had to maintain her hands-at-her-side, walking pose.

In 1992, Barbie: Game Girl was the first and only title to be released on the original Game Boy. In 1993, Barbie: Super Model became the first and only Barbie title to release on the Super Nintendo Entertainment System.

In 1999, Mattel Media released Adventures with Barbie: Ocean Discovery on Game Boy Color (GBC). Four titles were released on GBC, the final being Barbie: Pet Rescue in 2001.

Barbie: Groovy Games (2001) was the first Barbie title to release on Game Boy Advance (GBA). Eight titles would be released on the console, the final being Barbie as the Island Princess, in 2007.

The first title released on Nintendo DS, was the Barbie as the Island Princess movie tie-in game in 2007. Titles on the console would continue to be released until 2013's Barbie Dreamhouse Party. Three titles were released for Nintendo 3DS between 2013 and 2015, with all having corresponding Nintendo DS titles released prior or simultaneously.

Seven titles were released on the Wii, the first being Barbie as the Island Princess in 2007 and the final being Barbie & Her Sisters: Puppy Rescue, in 2015. Barbie Dreamhouse Party (2013) and Barbie & Her Sisters: Puppy Rescue (2015) were released on both the Wii and Wii U.

Barbie Project Friendship (2024) and Barbie Horse Trails (2025) were released on Nintendo Switch. Up until the release of Barbie Rewind (2026), there have been no titles on the Nintendo Switch 2.

==== Sega Genesis ====
Barbie: Super Model (1993) was the only Barbie title to release on the Sega Genesis console.

==== PlayStation ====
The first Barbie game to be released for the PlayStation console was Barbie Super Sports in 1999. It was originally a PlayStation exclusive until a Windows version was released in 2001. Five titles were released on PlayStation, with Barbie: Groovy Games being the final title released for the console in 2002. Runecraft developed three PlayStation exclusive games. Barbie Horse Adventures: Wild Horse Rescue, in 2003, was the first title to release on PlayStation 2 .Three more titles were released for PlayStation 2, with the final being Barbie Horse Adventures: Riding Camp in 2008. Barbie Project Friendship (2024) and Barbie Horse Trails (2025) were simultaneously released for both PlayStation 4 and PlayStation 5.

==== Xbox ====
Barbie Horse Adventures: Wild Horse Rescue (2003), was only title to release on the original Xbox console. Barbie & Her Sisters: Puppy Rescue (2015) was the only title to release on Xbox 360. Barbie Project Friendship (2024) and Barbie Horse Trails (2025) were released on Xbox One, and Xbox Series X and Series S.

=== Massively multiplayer online games ===
On April 24, 2007, Mattel opened an massively multiplayer online game (MMO) named BarbieGirls.com. The virtual world was initially successful, with 3 million players signing up in the first three months. The game was free-to-play, but members could purchase a VIP membership, which gave them access to more locations, mini-games and items. Mattel closed down the website in 2011.

In 2023, Mattel and Gamefam announced the launch of a Barbie experience on Roblox. Barbie DreamHouse Tycoon enables players to create their own Barbie inspired "dreamhouse" in a popular tycoon game model. Players can also customise their avatars with exclusive fashion items and accessories. Players can trial various careers through minigames. The game runs on the Roblox platform and is available on all devices Roblox is compatible with. Like other Roblox games, Barbie DreamHouse Tycoon utilises a free-to-play business model, with players able to buy various in-game extras using the virtual currency "Robux".

=== Mobile games ===
Budge Studios began releasing Barbie simulation and casual games for Android and IOS in 2014. They released four apps: Barbie Magical Fashion, Barbie Superstar! Music Maker, Barbie: Dreamtopia - Magical Hair, and Barbie: Dreamhouse Adventures. Mattel and Genera games released a puzzle game entitled Barbie Sparkle Blast, in 2016. Barbie Color Creations is the most recent title for Barbie on Android and IOS, released in 2023 by StoryToys Entertainment Ltd.

== List of Barbie video games ==
† = Denotes Barbie film/TV series tie-in

Title	Year	Platform	Publisher	Developer	Genre	Ref.
Adventures with Barbie: Ocean Discovery	1997	Windows	Mattel Media	Gorilla Systems	Action	
Adventures with Barbie: Ocean Discovery	1999	Game Boy Color	Mattel Media	Realtime Associates	Action	
Barbie	1984	Commodore 64	Epyx	A. Eddy Goldfarb & Associates	Simulation	
Barbie	1991	MS-DOS; NES	Hi-Tech Entertainment	Imagineering	Action, platformer, 2D	
Barbie & Her Sisters: Puppy Rescue †	2015	Nintendo 3DS; Wii; Wii U; Windows; Xbox 360	Little Orbit	Torus Games	Action-adventure,simulation	
Barbie and Her Magical House	1994	Macintosh; Windows	Hi-Tech Entertainment	The Cute Company	Educational, adventure	
Barbie and the Magic of Pegasus †	2005	Windows	Vivendi Universal Games	Blue Monkey Studios	Adventure	
Barbie and the Magic of Pegasus †	2005	Game Boy Advance	Vivendi Universal Games	Wayforward	Adventure, 2D	
Barbie and the Three Musketeers †	2009	Nintendo DS; Wii; Windows	Activision	Wayforward	Platformer, action, 2D	
Barbie as Princess Bride	2000	Macintosh; Windows	Mattel Interactive	Random Games	Adventure	
Barbie as Rapunzel: A Creative Adventure †	2002	Macintosh; Windows	Vivendi Universal Games	Funnybone Interactive	Adventure	
Barbie as Sleeping Beauty	1999	Macintosh; Windows	Mattel Media	Gorilla Systems	Adventure	
Barbie as the Island Princess †	2007	Game Boy Advance; Nintendo DS	Activision	Human Soft	Party/Minigame	
Barbie as the Island Princess †	2007	PlayStation 2; Wii; Windows	Activision	Ivolgamus	Party/Minigame	
Barbie as the Princess and the Pauper †	2004	Game Boy Advance; Macintosh; Windows	Vivendi Universal Games	Wayforward	Adventure	
Barbie Beach Vacation	2001	Windows	Vivendi Universal Games	Krome Studios	Party/Minigame	
Barbie Beauty Boutique	2003	Windows	Vivendi Universal Games	Knowledge Adventure	Educational entertainment	
Barbie Beauty Styler	2002	Macintosh; Windows	Vivendi Universal Games	Addictive Media	Educational entertainment	
Barbie Color Creations	2023	Android; IOS	StoryToys Entertainment Ltd.	StoryToys Entertainment Ltd.	Entertainment	
Barbie Dreamhouse Party	2013	Nintendo 3DS; Nintendo DS; Wii; Wii U; Windows	Little Orbit	Torus Games	Party/Minigame	
Barbie DreamHouse Tycoon	2023	Android; IOS; macOS; Meta Quest 2; Meta Quest Pro; PlayStation 4; Windows; Xbox One	Mattel	Gamefam	MMO, tycoon	
Barbie Explorer	2001	PlayStation	Vivendi Universal Games	Runecraft	Action, platformer, 3D	
Barbie Explorer	2002	Windows	Vivendi Universal Games	Runecraft	Action, platformer, 3D	
Barbie Fashion Designer	1996	Macintosh; Windows	Mattel Media	Digital Domain	Educational entertainment	
Barbie Fashion Pack Games	2000	Game Boy Color	Mattel Interactive	Hyperspace Cowgirls	Action, minigame	
Barbie Fashion Show	2004	Windows	Vivendi Universal Games	Vivendi Universal Games	Simulation	
Barbie Fashion Show: An Eye for Style	2008	Nintendo DS; Windows	Activision	Cyber Planet Interactive	Simulation	
Barbie Generation Girl: Gotta Groove	1999	Windows	Mattel Interactive	Stunt Puppy Entertainment	Music	
Barbie Horse Adventures: Blue Ribbon Race	2003	Game Boy Advance	Vivendi Universal Games	Blitz Games; Möbius Entertainment	Sports	
Barbie Horse Adventures: Mystery Ride	2003	Windows	Vivendi Universal Games	Blue Monkey Studios	Action, adventure	
Barbie Horse Adventures: Riding Camp	2008	PlayStation 2; Wii; Windows	Activision	Pixel Tales	Sports	
Barbie Horse Adventures: Riding Camp	2008	Nintendo DS	Activision	Farmind	Sports	
Barbie Horse Adventures: Wild Horse Rescue	2003	PlayStation 2; Xbox	Vivendi Universal Games	Blitz Games	Adventure	
Barbie Horse Trails	2025	Nintendo Switch; PlayStation 4; PlayStation 5; Windows; Xbox One; Xbox Series X and Series S	Outright Games	PHL Collective	Adventure, casual, simulation	
Barbie in The 12 Dancing Princesses †	2006	Game Boy Advance	Activision	WayForward	Action	
Barbie in The 12 Dancing Princesses †	2006	PlayStation 2; Windows	Activision	Blue Monkey Studios	Action	
Barbie Magic Genie Bottle	2000	Windows	Mattel Interactive	Gorilla Systems	Action, adventure	
Barbie Magic Hair Styler	1997	Windows	Mattel Media	EAI Interactive	Educational entertainment	
Barbie Magical Fashion	2014	Android; iOS	Budge Studios	Budge Studios	Simulation, casual	
Barbie Mermaid Adventure	2004	Macintosh; Windows	Vivendi Universal Games	Knowledge Adventure	Educational entertainment	
Barbie Nail Designer	1998	Windows	Mattel Media	Mattel Media	Educational entertainment	
Barbie of Swan Lake: The Enchanted Forest †	2003	Macintosh; Windows	Vivendi Universal Games	Knowledge Adventure	Adventure	
Barbie PC Fashion Design & Color	1991	MS-DOS	Mattel Media	Digital Domain	Simulation	
Barbie Project Friendship †	2024	Nintendo Switch; PlayStation 4; PlayStation 5; Windows; Xbox One; Xbox Series X and Series S	Outright Games	Xaloc Studios; Casual Brothers Games	Adventure, casual, simulation	
Barbie Riding Club	1998	Windows	Mattel Media	Human Code	Sports	
Barbie Sparkle Blast	2016	Android; iOS	Mattel	Genera Games	Puzzle	
Barbie Sparkling Ice Show	2002	Windows	Vivendi Universal Games	Krome Studios	Sports	
Barbie Storymaker	1997	Windows	Mattel Media	Optimum Interactive	Adventure, visual novel	
Barbie Super Sports	1999	PlayStation	Mattel Media	Runecraft	Sports	
Barbie Super Sports	2001	Windows	Mattel Media	Runecraft	Sports	
Barbie Superstar! Music Maker	2015	Android; iOS	Budge Studios	Budge Studios	Music	
Barbie Team Gymnastics	2001	Windows	Vivendi Universal Games	Blue Planet Software	Sports	
Barbie: Dreamhouse Adventures	2018	Android; iOS	Budge Studios	Budge Studios	Simulation	
Barbie: Dreamtopia - Magical Hair †	2016	Android; iOS	Budge Studios	Budge Studios	Simulation	
Barbie: Game Girl	1992	Game Boy	Hi-Tech Entertainment	Imagineering	Platformer (2D)	
Barbie: Groom and Glam Pups	2010	Nintendo DS; Wii	Little Orbit	Game Machine Studios	Simulation	
Barbie: Groom and Glam Pups	2013	Nintendo 3DS	Little Orbit	Game Machine Studios	Simulation	
Barbie: Groovy Games	2002	Game Boy Advance; PlayStation	Vivendi Universal Games	Digital Illusions Canada	Party/Minigame	
Barbie: Jet, Set & Style!	2011	Nintendo DS; Wii	THQ	Game Machine Studios	Miscellaneous	
Barbie: Magic Genie Adventure	2000	Game Boy Color	Mattel Interactive	Vicarious Visions	Action-adventure	
Barbie: Pet Rescue	2000	Windows	Mattel Interactive	Human Code	Educational entertainment	
Barbie: Pet Rescue	2001	Game Boy Color	Vivendi Universal Games	HotGen Studios	Educational entertainment	
Barbie: Race & Ride	1999	PlayStation	Mattel Media	Runecraft	Sports	
Barbie: Super Model	1993	Genesis; MS-DOS; SNES	Hi-Tech Entertainment	Tahoe Software Productions	Action	
BarbieGirls.com	2007	Web browser	Mattel	Mattel	MMO	
Detective Barbie 2: The Vacation Mystery	1999	Windows	Mattel Media	Gorilla Systems	Adventure	
Detective Barbie in the Mystery of the Carnival Caper	1998	Windows	Mattel Media	Gorilla Systems	Adventure	
Detective Barbie: The Mystery Cruise	2000	PlayStation	Mattel Interactive	Runecraft	Adventure	
Magic Fairy Tales: Barbie as Rapunzel	1997	Macintosh; Windows	Mattel Media	Media Station	Educational, adventure	
Secret Agent Barbie	2001	Windows	Vivendi Universal Games	Gigawatt Studios	Action (3D)	
Secret Agent Barbie: Royal Jewel Mission	2002	Game Boy Advance	Vivendi Universal Games	Digital Illusions Canada	Platformer (2D)	
The Barbie Diaries: High School Mystery †	2006	Game Boy Advance	Activision	Gorilla Systems; NeoPong Software	Adventure	
The Barbie Diaries: High School Mystery †	2006	Windows	Activision	Super-Ego Games	Adventure	
Working Woman Barbie	1999	Windows	Mattel Media	Gorilla Systems	Action	
Barbie: Horse Ride & Rescue	2026	Android IOS	PikPok	PikPok	Adventure, casual, simulation	

== Cancelled Barbie video games ==
Title	Year	Platform(s)	Publisher	Developer(s)	Ref.
Barbie: Vacation Adventure	1994	Sega Genesis Super Nintendo	Hi-Tech Expressions as Hi-Tech Entertainment	Software Creations	
Barbie: Treasures in Time	2002	PlayStation 2, GameCube	Vivendi Universal Games	Runecraft	
Barbie Horse Adventures: Wild Horse Rescue	2003	GameCube	Vivendi Universal Games	Blitz Games	
BarbieGirls.com	2011	Web browser	Mattel	Mattel	
