= Chris Anthony (voice actress) =

American voice actress (born 1957)

Chris Anthony Lansdowne
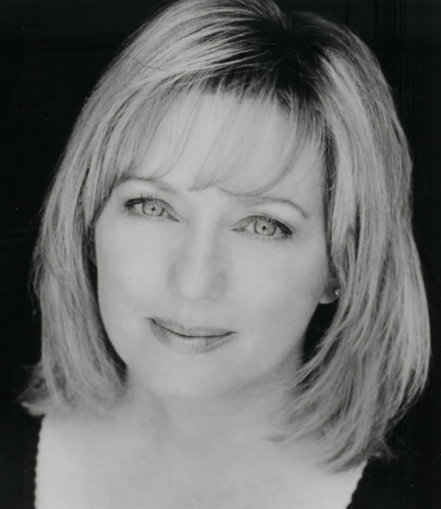
- Born: Christine D'Antonio; January 10, 1957 (age 69); Aliquippa, Pennsylvania, U.S.
- Occupation: Voice actress
- Spouse: J. L. Lansdowne (m. 1985)
- Children: 1

Chris Anthony Lansdowne,(born January 10, 1957, as Christine D'Antonio), is an American voice actress best known as host of Focus on the Family's Adventures in Odyssey. Along with Katie Leigh, she is the only remaining original cast member of the show.

== Career ==
As host of Adventures in Odyssey for almost four decades, she is heard weekly on more than 2,000 radio stations worldwide. Aside from her work in radio drama, video games, animation, and TV/radio commercials, Anthony is also known for having voiced more than 100 Mattel talking Barbie games, toys, dolls and talking picture books from 1994 to 2006.

Anthony has been the host of Adventures in Odyssey since it was started in 1987, and has also played several characters in the series. She was in the Adventures in Odyssey video series for A Flight to the Finish and Star Quest. Other radio drama work includes the role of Ronda in the children's radio drama Jungle Jam and Friends: The Radio Show! and Marsha in Paws & Tales.

== Filmography ==
=== Film ===
Year	Title	Role	Notes
2020	Ella Bella Bingo	Johnny's mom	Voice
2021	Rumble	Farmer	Voice

=== Television ===
Year	Title	Role	Notes
1989	Ring Raiders	Jenny Gail	5 episodes
1991	She Stood Alone	Catherine Ann	Television film
2001	Johnny Bravo	Bank Teller	Voice, episode: "Lord of the Links/Bootman/Freudian Dip"
2012	ThunderCats	Mama	Voice, episode: "Survival of the Fittest"
2019	Trolls: The Beat Goes On!	Old Lady Troll	Voice, episode: "Apple of My Ire/Funsgiving"
2020	Kipo and the Age of Wonderbeasts	Florabel	Voice, 2 episodes
2020	Curious George	Anna	Voice, episode: "Bee Like Me/To the Lighthouse"

=== Video games ===
Year	Title	Role
1996	Barbie Fashion Designer	Barbie
1996	Barbie Storymaker	Barbie
1997	Barbie Cool Looks Fashion Designer	Barbie
1997	Adventures with Barbie: Ocean Discovery	Barbie
1998	Barbie Photo Designer	Barbie
1998	Barbie Riding Club	Barbie
1998	Detective Barbie in the Mystery of the Carnival Caper	Barbie
1999	Barbie Digital Makeover	Barbie
1999	Detective Barbie 2: The Vacation Mystery	Barbie
1999	Barbie Sticker Designer	Narrator
2000	Jumpstart: Artist	Voice
2000	Barbie: Pet Rescue	Barbie
2000	Barbie Princess Bride	Barbie
2001	Barbie: Explorer	Barbie
2001	Secret Agent Barbie	Barbie / Shop Owner
2018	Fallout 76	Various voices
