= Barbie and Her Magical House =

1994 video game

Barbie and her Magical House
- Developer: The Cute Company
- Publisher: Hi Tech Entertainment
- Platforms: Microsoft Windows, Macintosh
- Release: October 1994
- Genre: Educational
- Mode: Single-player

Barbie and Her Magical House is a 1994 video game developed by The Cute Company and published by Hi Tech Entertainment for Microsoft Windows and Macintosh. It was the first Barbie-licensed CD-ROM.

== Gameplay ==
Gameplay screenshot

Players use point and click controls to decorate 150 elements across thirteen interactive scenes of Barbie's house, including her bedroom, bathroom, kitchen and living room. The game features several minigames, including 'What Should I Wear?', 'Popping Bubbles', a matching game with Barbie's clothes, and jigsaw puzzles.

== Development ==
Barbie and Her Magical House was developed by The Cute Co., a children's entertainment and educational software developer later acquired by Davidson & Associates, hired by New York company Hi Tech Entertainment. The game was produced by Hi Tech Entertainment alongside Sega Genesis titles Barbie: Vacation Adventure and Barbie: Super Model, and was the first Barbie-licensed CD-ROM title. Hi Tech Entertainment producer Leila Chang stated Barbie manufacturer Mattel was "very strict" about how Barbie should be represented, suggesting to The Cute Co. to make design changes to Barbie's face, hair and dress. The game was showcased at the Summer 1994 Consumer Electronics Show in June, and slated for an October 1994 release.

== Reviews ==
Cynthia Sorrels of Games Domain Review said she was "pleasantly surprised" by the program due to the "thoughtful [and] entertaining" puzzles and activities, although she criticized the lack of a storyline or plot. Carrie St. Michel of The Salt Lake Tribune found the decoration gameplay simple and "hardly challenging". Stating the game "wasn't anything special at all" and "sort of tedious", Mattel Interactive designer Nancie Martin stated that she felt the game did not address what girls were interested in, which led to a different direction in the development of the next Barbie title, Barbie Fashion Designer.
