= Barbie Nail Designer =

1998 video game within the Barbie franchise

- Publisher: Mattel Media
- Release: 1998

Barbie Nail Designer is a 1998 dress-up game within the Barbie franchise, published by Mattel Media, and released in September 1998.

== Reception ==
In the week ending October 24, it was the third bestselling game after Deer Hunter II and Need for Speed 3. In the week ending November 14, the game was one of the top three best selling titles alongside Barbie Riding Club and Railroad Tycoon II. In the week ending December 5, 1998, it was the seventh bestselling game. According to Happy Puppy, the title is "nothing like a game".

== See also ==
- List of Barbie video games
