= Barbie (1991 video game) =

- NES box art
- Developer: Imagineering
- Publisher: Hi Tech Expressions
- Producer: Dan Feinstein
- Designers: Alex DeMeo; Barry Marx
- Programmers: Henry C. Will IV; Chung S. Lau; Mark Morris (additional)
- Artists: Frank Lam; Jesse Kapili (additional); Jogene Kapell (additional); Mike Sullivan (additional)
- Composers: Mark Van Hecke, Ken Kirschner, Billy Pidgeon, Danny Ray
- Series: Barbie
- Platforms: Nintendo Entertainment System, MS-DOS
- Release: NA: December 1991; EU: 1992
- Genre: Platform
- Mode: Single-player

Barbie is a 1991 platform video game developed by Imagineering and published by Hi Tech Expressions for the Nintendo Entertainment System and MS-DOS. It is based on Mattel Inc.'s doll of the same name. The game takes place in a dream where Barbie must travel through three different worlds (Mall, Underwater and Soda Shop) to gather accessories before attending a ball to meet Ken.

Barbie was created in an attempt to get more girls to play video games. Despite it having been of little interest to typical gamers at the time of its release, critics including staff writers for Velikij Drakon and Allgame have praised it as "not bad" for a generic platformer. Others including Justine Cassell and Nathanael Ng of the Georgia Institute of Technology have advanced the view that its genre is not appropriate for its content.

== Plot ==
Barbie dreams that she has been invited to the Fantasy Ball, but in her dream she has nothing nice to wear. She travels to three different worlds to gather accessories for the big night and a chance with Ken. Along the way she meets a veritable menagerie of animal friends and searches to find Dream-Ups, Glamor Items, and Charms for her bracelet that will help her along her way.

In Mall World, Barbie goes on a shopping spree for Barbie coins that she uses at the wishing fountain to acquire an exquisite pink ball gown. In Underwater World, Mermaid Barbie and a few helpful dolphins search for pearls that Barbie returns to a giant oyster in exchange for an elegant pearl ring. Finally, in the 1950s-style Soda Shop Barbie must collect gold records that she uses to make a stairway into the sky to collect the last accessory, a charming pair of sparkly high heels. Barbie returns to the Barbie Dream House to get ready for the Fantasy Ball, and as she descends the stairs wearing all of her accessories, a dapper Ken awaits to dance with her.

== Gameplay ==
Barbie is a platform game with levels that take place in dreams. In each stage, Barbie walks left to right while avoiding obstacles to keep her "Zs" from dropping which would make her wake up and have to replay the level, or sometimes restart the entire game. Barbie can also request help from animals by selecting one of the charms on her charm bracelet to signal what sort of action the animal should perform. Pressing the B-button then throws the command. If the command reaches the animal, the animal will perform the command requested. Enemies are all normally inanimate objects like tennis rackets, kites, shoes, pizza, water, popcorn, etc. that Barbie must evade by leaping over them. At the end of each section a boss battle occurs with the boss usually being overcome with the help of an animal.

== Development and release ==
Barbie was designed by Hi Tech Expressions in an attempt to get more girls to play video games, although the developers tried to make the gameplay appealing to boys as well. Following the 1984 release of an earlier title also called simply Barbie, the game became the second in the Barbie series. Together with the later Barbie: Game Girl and Barbie: Super Model, the Barbie series was aimed at a young audience that Hi Tech Expressions listed as 3 to 9, and that third parties recommend to those 3 to 8.

The basic sales and research data that Hi Tech Expressions examined in designing the game suggested that girls tended to prefer activity-based or puzzle-oriented games over the shoot-'em-up games that were popular at the time. To accommodate this preference, the team endeavored to include puzzles and mazes while avoiding any reference to blood and violence. The game was originally slated for release in October 1991, but delays caused it to be released two months later in December.

The game has two versions, one of which contains 3 new songs composed by Hi Tech Expressions producer Billy Pidgeon, Ken Kirschner, and Danny Ray.

== Reception and legacy ==
Reception

Review scores
Publication	Score
AllGame	3/5
Total!	19%
Video Games (DE)	35%
Game Freaks 365	6.9/10
N-Force	34%
Super Gamer	15%

A review published in AllGame praised it as "not just a game of silly fashions and changing outfits," but a game that "actually has simple puzzles and decent, albeit slow, platform action," and the Russian Velikij Drakon noted that the game even had a few secret areas (commonly denoted by the "B" block). Game Freaks 365 said the game was "much more interesting than you'd probably think. The pink, cute label art displaying the classic doll in 90s regalia doesn't stare you down as something with any sort of depth, but once you actually start to play it you find there's quite a bit going on in this little platformer."

On the other hand, critics have pointed out that the game feels like it has been shoehorned into an inappropriate genre for its content and that even for a platformer it is wholly unremarkable. In her book, From Barbie to Mortal Kombat: Gender and Computer Games, Justine Cassell uses Barbie as an example of typical "pink" software—software designed with a male audience that is merely re-skinned for female gamers without regard for their different tastes in gaming. Cassell notes that in the design of the early 1990s Barbie video games, Mattel supervisors were only interested in the superficial visual appearances and left the game mechanics and development to third parties. Seanbaby ranked the game #6 on his top 20 "Worst Nintendo Games", writing that "It's not just because I'm a boy; this game really really sucks." Reviewers in Velikij Drakon criticized the bosses as unimpressive, questioning for example whether as serious a word as "boss" could plausibly be warranted for "a pair of jumping pants and a jersey" (the second boss).

Barbie was discussed in 1992 by the United States House of Representatives during a hearing chaired by the Subcommittee on Intellectual Property and Judicial Administration (under the Committee on the Judiciary) in which it was noted that the game had been subject to frequent counterfeiting and related copyright and trademark infringements. The bulk of Barbie counterfeits were noted to have originally come from Taiwan, however at the time the counterfeiters were shifting operations toward Korea, Hong Kong, and China. As the House noted, the counterfeit operations that sought to infringe Barbie's intellectual property rights were large-scale and sophisticated operations working with the very latest ROM technology. Some of the counterfeit cartridges were essentially exact duplicates indistinguishable in quality from the original product.

== See also ==
- List of Barbie video games
