= Virtual dress-up game =

Fashion video game

A virtual dress-up game, also known as a fashion video game, is a genre of video game which involves customising the appearance of characters using things such as clothing, hair and makeup. This genre has a female-heavy audience. The first commercially successful video game marketed for girls was Barbie Fashion Designer, an example of a virtual dress-up game. In 2012, dress-up games were one of the top three most popular video game categories among tween girls.

== History ==
=== Kisekae ===
A KiSS doll

In the 1990s, developers began creating virtual dress-up games utilising drag-and-drop features; an early example of this is the Kisekae Set System. The Kisekae set system, commonly known as KiSS, is a Japanese file format developed in 1991 intended for coding digital paper dolls. These dolls were based upon shōjo manga characters.

The word Kisekae in Japanese means "changing clothes" and commonly refers to the paper dolls found on the back pages of manga. It was these dolls which influenced the Japanese creator MIO.H to create this file format.

The primary audience for these games was male, and the dolls overwhelmingly represented teenage girls. The characters were often portrayed in a sexual manner, allowing players to undress the girls.

=== Barbie Fashion Designer ===
In 1996, Barbie Fashion Designer was released for Microsoft Windows and Macintosh by Mattel Media. As the ninth most popular video game of 1996 it outsold both Quake and Doom. It the first successful video game targeted at girls, and as such, paved the way for the girls' video game movement. There was a lot of risks associated with its release as many retailers refused to stock it, as they did not think that girls would be interested in video games.

The gameplay included creating fashion designs which then could be printed on fabric paper, allowing them to be worn by real-life Barbie dolls.

Many women have identified Barbie Fashion Designer as the first video game they played. It has been inducted into the World Video Game Hall of Fame, the museum stated that the game was a "key part of a longer history of expanding audiences for video games, proving that girls enjoyed playing electronically as much as boys did".

=== Dollz ===
The Palace was launched in 1995 which allowed users to access different semi-anonymous chat rooms named palaces. Players could use avatars to differentiate themselves from others. These avatars originally were just generic smileys, but eventually in 1997 users were able to comprise their avatars of nine pieces (three for the body and six for the clothing). Some palaces served as venues for dollz dress-up competitions known as pageants, which were peer-run and judged, with varying themes.

=== Adobe Flash ===
With the introduction of Macromedia Flash technology, dress-up games vastly increased in number. Flash allowed many people to create games easily and quickly.

Popular Flash dress-up websites included DollDivine, Rinmaru, Cartoon Doll Imporium, Stardoll and DressUpGames. GirlsGoGames in particular was a very popular website which hosted dress-up games, with 7.6 million visitors every month from 2011-2012, making it the most visited website for tween girls in the United States.

Adobe discontinued Flash Player in 2020, leading to many Flash dress-up games becoming unplayable or lost.

== Platforms ==
=== Console ===
"Pink games", notably including dress-up games became prevalant on consoles as female interest in gaming increased. Console dress-up games often will contain additional aspects such as retail management, or fighting mechanics.

==== Xbox and Playstation ====
- Bratz - 2002
- Bratz: Rock Angelz - 2005
- Bratz: Flaunt your fashion - 2022
- Rainbow High Runway Rush - 2023
- Infinity Nikki - 2024
- Bratz Rhythm & Style - 2025

==== Computer ====
- Barbie for Commodore 64 -1984
- McKenzie & Co. - 1995
- Barbie Fashion Designer - 1996
- The 3D Adventures of Sailor Moon - 1996
- Barbie Magic Hair Styler - 1997
- Clueless - 1997
- Barbie Cool Looks Fashion Designer - 1998
- Barbie Nail Designer - 1998
- The American Girls: Dress Designer -1999
- Barbie Digital Makeover - 1999
- Barbie Generation Girl: Gotta Groove - 1999
- Barbie Fashion Pack Games - 2000
- Shinning Nikki - 2020
- Infinity Nikki - 2024

==== Arcade ====
- Love and Berry: Dress Up and Dance! was an arcade game developed by Sega and released in 2004. The game utilised collectable cards which allowed players to change their clothing, makeup and hair. The winner was decided by the performance in the rhythm game and the coordination of the outfits. It was later made into a DS game.
- Lilpri - 2009
- Pretty rhythm (franchise) - 2010
- Aikatsu - 2012
- PriPara - 2014
- Otocadoll - 2015
- PreCure - 2017

==== Nintendo ====
- Imagine: Fashion Designer - 2007
- Imagine: Fashion Designer New York - 2008
- Style Savvy - 2008
- Imagine: Fashion Party - 2009
- Imagine: Makeup Artist - 2009
- Imagine: Boutique Owner - 2009
- Imagine: Salon Stylist - 2009
- Imagine: Fashion Designer World Tour - 2009
- America's Next Top Model - 2010
- Fashion Tycoon - 2010
- Imagine: Babyz Fashion - 2010
- Imagine: Fashion Stylist - 2011
- Barbie: Jet, Set & Style! - 2011
- Style Savvy: Trendsetters - 2012
- Imagine: Fashion Life - 2012
- Imagine: Fashion World 3D - 2012
- Style Savvy: Fashion Forward - 2015
- Style Savvy: Styling Star - 2017
- MODEL Debut #Nicola - 2019
- Selfy Collection - 2020
- MODEL Debut2 - 2021
- Fashion Dreamer - 2023
- My Universe: Fashion Boutique - 2023
- MODEL Debut3 - 2024
- MODEL Debut4 - 2025
- Magical Craft: My Enchanted Dress Shop - 2026

==== Casio Loopy ====
The Loopy was a console released exclusively in Japan and marketed to a female audience. Ten games released, three of which were dress up games.

- Dream Change: Kokin-chan’s Fashion Party - 1995
- Nigaoe Artist - 1995
- Anime Land - 1995

=== Mobile ===
Around 2021, dress-up games began to become more popular due to their use as profile picture creators. Picrew, a Japanese dress-up game host, in particular gained popularity around this time. It was especially popular due to its diverse representation of LGBTQ identities, skin colour, and body types. It allowed users to create profile pictures which accurately reflected themselves and their identities, which was previously very difficult using older dress-up games.

Everskies is an online dress-up mobile game, inspired by 2000s internet games. It allows players to make and sell their own clothing and participate in competitions. It collaborated with the Winx Club in 2024.

=== Roblox ===
Dress to impress, a Roblox game, was developed in 2023, it has had over six billion visits. The game focuses on competition style gameplay, where players make outfits which are then voted on by each other.

== Benefits ==
Dress-up games can encourage girls to work in the fashion industry. The lack of explicit story and the sandbox nature of the games can encourage creativity and allow players to experiment. The games allow for self-expression, particularly with modern dress-up games that allow for diverse representation.

Dress-up games were found to positively contribute to the cognitive development of children who played them.

== Controversies ==
=== Body image and sexualisation ===
Dress-up games have been criticised for sexualising women, mainly due to the clothing selection offered and the lack of substance behind the characters. Many of the games were found to not be suitable for children due to their sexual content. Many of the games also centre celebrities and as such may promote unhealthy body image.

=== Stereotypes ===
Another criticism that has been made against them is that they promote the overgeneralisation of gender and strict gender stereotypes. Some see their supposed low quality due to the lack of quality games aimed at girls. The games are often seen as putting women in boxes and socialising girls to fit beauty standards. They may also promote materialism and have been criticised for advertising real brands to children.
