= Barbie Storymaker =

1996 video game

- Publisher: Mattel Media
- Platform: Microsoft Windows
- Release: October 1996
- Genre: Educational

Barbie Storymaker is a 1996 video game by Mattel Media for Microsoft Windows. The game allows players to create animated movies starring virtual dolls of Barbie and her friends by using an editor to select, edit and sequence scenes featuring animated props and characters. The game was the first released by Mattel Media, a newly-created division of Mattel, alongside Barbie Fashion Designer. Upon release, critics praised Storymaker for its educational and creative potential for girls, although some reviewers found its features and documentation to be complex for younger children without parental assistance.

== Gameplay ==
Players can use click and drag controls to move the direction of characters in a scene.

Storymaker allows players to create animations using tools set over several 'Studio' menus. In the Scenes Studio, players select a background and props for scenes, such as a beach, ballet studio, nightclub, house or shopping mall. They can place up to seven characters, including Barbie, her friends (such as Skipper and Ken), and animals, and adjust their clothes and position. The path of movement of characters in a scene can be set by players using click and drag controls to draw an invisible track. Players can also add additional text, animation, sound, and effects, and players with a microphone can add narration to scenes. The Paint Studio allows for the creation or modification of custom backgrounds. In the Editing Studio, players sequence up to twelve scenes, and add opening and end credits to complete the story. The Screening Room allows players to see the finished film. Players can save the stories to view and edit later, and design coloring book pages featuring created stories to print on their computer printer.

== Development ==
Storymaker was one of several Barbie-licensed titles released by publisher Mattel Media, a division of Mattel that entered the software market in 1996. It accompanied the release of other titles, including Barbie Fashion Designer and Barbie Print 'n Play. Nancie Martin, who served as executive producer for the three titles, described Storymaker as centred on reflecting girls' play patterns of inventing dialogue and scenarios between Barbie dolls to tell their own stories, likening the process to "creating a little movie". Storymaker was announced and showcased at E3 in April 1996, and released in October of that year. The software was distributed in toy stores alongside Barbie displays.

== Reception ==
Reception

Review scores
Publication	Score
AllGame	4/5
Children's Software Review	4.5/5
PC World	A
Personal Computer World	3/5

Storymaker received generally positive reviews, focusing upon the educational potential of the game. Allgame wrote that Storymaker was "potentially educational", and the game was discussed in terms of its ability to assist with writing or computer skills, with The Ledger stating it may encourage writing skills in younger players, although other titles "do a much better job". Reviewers wrote that the game featured a large amount of content and could support a child's imagination, with the Childrens' Software Review considering it to offer "plenty of open-ended creativity options", and the Evening Mail writing that the game offered a "wide range" of characters, scenes and effects to provide players with creative possibilities.

Critics were divided on the ease of use of the software. Some felt it was easy to use, with the Cedar Rapids Gazette praised Storymaker for being "remarkably easy" for younger players and having "intuitive, icon based controls". Other critics found it less user-friendly for younger players. The Sydney Morning Herald considered it "not quite as intuitive as it should be", writing that it was not obvious what the purpose of the game's tools were. Superkids also felt the game's appeal was impacted by difficult and time-consuming features younger players may not understand, critiquing its "skimpy" instruction manual and need for "significant instruction" from a parent. Allgame wrote that whilst the instructions were only "adequate", the instruction from a parent to help direct a child with the software could help "bring a parent and child together".

== See also ==
- List of Barbie video games
