= Barbie: Groovy Games =

2002 video game

- Developer: Digital Illusions Canada
- Producer: Vivendi Universal Games
- Platforms: Game Boy Advance, PlayStation
- Release: GBA September 2002; PlayStation November 2003
- Genre: Puzzle
- Mode: Single-player

Barbie: Groovy Games is a 2002 video game developed by Digital Illusions Canada and published by Vivendi Universal for the Game Boy Advance. A PlayStation version was released in 2003 as Barbie: Gotta Have Games. It was the first Barbie-licensed video game released for the Advance, featuring variations of traditional games and puzzles. Upon release, the game received mixed reviews. Following release, the game was repackaged with Secret Agent Barbie.

== Gameplay ==
Gameplay screenshot

Groovy Games is a collection of nine action and puzzle games played as Barbie or Ken. DJ Booth is a memory game where players must match CDs. Several titles are iterations of traditional game s: it features Four Scoops, a version of Connect Four, Tic Tac Toe, and Daisy Derby, a version of hangman. The games each feature three levels of difficulty. The game supports multiplayer play for players for several of the activities.

== Reception ==
Reception

Review scores
Publication	Score	
Publication	GBA	PS
AllGame		2/5
IGN	3/10	3/10
Nintendo Power	2.5/5	
Total Advance	82%	

Total Advance found the game simple but "colourful, fun and educational", writing that some of the games had "imaginative twists" on their traditional counterparts. IGN found the games in Groovy Games to be "fun, simple diversions", but considered they had limited replayability and challenge, ad lamented the lack of a main game, narrative, save system, scoring or multiplayer play. Electronic Gaming Monthly dismissed Groovy Games as a "collection of old games", considering it was made no more fun simply because of its cutesy design. Game Rant retrospectively felt it was "not a good crop of mini-games" due to their simplicity.
