= Mother Goose's Farm =

1996 video game

- Developer: Albathion Software Inc
- Publisher: Mattel Media
- Platforms: Windows; Macintosh
- Release: 1996

Mother Goose's Farm (also known as Mother Goose's Farm 4 Learning) is a 1996 video game from Mattel Media. The game is for ages 3 to 6.

== Gameplay ==
Mother Goose's Farm 4 Learning is an educational CD-ROM game designed for preschoolers ages 3 to 6, and requires only basic mouse-clicking skills. It includes interactive activities, music, and animations in a farm setting, where they can explore the barnyard, farmhouse, playground, and garden. Learning activities prompt kids to sort, match, spell, color, and sing along to nursery rhymes.

== Development ==
Mother Goose's Farm was developed by Albathion Software, a company founded in 1986.

== Reception ==
Reception

Review scores
Publication	Score
All Game Guide	4/5
Kearney Hub	3.5/5

All Game Guide called the game amusing and funny.

Kearney Hub said "All the games include standard devices such as positive reinforcement and increased difficulty. They also have an uncanny sense of whimsy that make them unavoidably enjoyable for any tot in front of the screen. Mother Goose" is a delightful package".

The game won a Bronze Invision Award for Best Children's Title.
