= Bratz (video game) =

2002 Bratz video game

- Bratz PAL front cover
- Developer: DC Studios
- Publisher: Ubi Soft
- Engine: Virtools SA
- Platforms: Game Boy Advance; Windows; PlayStation
- Release: Microsoft Windows: NA: December 17, 2002; Game Boy Advance: NA: March 12, 2003; EU: 2003; PlayStation: NA: March 12, 2003; EU: May 2, 2003
- Genre: Music
- Modes: Single player Multiplayer

Bratz is a 2002 dress-up videogame based on the Bratz doll line.

== Gameplay ==
In the game, the player must dance through each level using platform-specific controls. Each completed level unlocks new fashions, dance moves to use in the "freestyle" mode, and the next level. At the end of the game, the player unlocks a bonus level. There are 5 different bonus levels, each one specific to the five Bratz girls available to play (Yasmin, Cloe, Sasha, Jade, or Meygan).
