= Detective Barbie =

- Genres: Mystery, Adventure
- Developers: Gorilla Systems Corporation (Carnival Caper and Vacation Mystery); Runecraft (Mystery Cruise)
- Publisher: Mattel Media/Mattel Interactive
- Original release: 1998-2000
- First release: Detective Barbie In the Mystery of the Carnival Caper! 1998
- Latest release: Detective Barbie: The Mystery Cruise; November 20, 2000

Detective Barbie is a series of three mystery themed point and click adventure games starring the character Barbie. The series consists of Detective Barbie in the Mystery of the Carnival Caper (1998) Detective Barbie 2: The Vacation Mystery (1999), and Detective Barbie: The Mystery Cruise (2000). The first two games were developed by Gorilla Systems Corporation and published on the PC by Mattel Media/Mattel Interactive. The third game was developed for the PlayStation by Runecraft.

== History ==
In the late 1990s, Mattel often provided the first two games as an included bonus with their pink-and-silver Barbie PCs made by Patriot Computers.

== Plot ==
=== Detective Barbie In the Mystery of the Carnival Caper! ===
Ken went to a local carnival and volunteered for a disappearing magic trick and now he can't be found. It is up the player to locate him. Tasks include gathering clues in specific locations of the park, solving puzzles, and playing mini-games.

=== Detective Barbie 2: The Vacation Mystery ===
Team Barbie Detective (Barbie, Ken, and Becky) solve a mystery regarding a series of antique jewels that have been stolen at Lighthouse Cove hotel. Players can use the Barbie GamePad to play the game. Clues are on different locations each new game. Clues bring Barbie closer to solving the mystery and make her find puzzle pieces that contains a mysterious message on the back once fully assembled.

=== Detective Barbie: The Mystery Cruise ===
Announced on November 20, 2000, this was a two-player game. The premise involves Barbie investigating the disappearance of artworks from a cruise ship.

== See also ==
- List of Barbie video games
