= The Rugrats Mystery Adventures =

1999 video game

- Developer: KnowWare
- Publisher: Mattel Media
- Platforms: Windows; Classic MacOS
- Release: 1999
- Genre: Edutainment
- Mode: Single-player

The Rugrats Mystery Adventures is a 1999 licensed edutainment video game developed by KnowWare and published by Mattel Media for Microsoft Windows and Classic MacOS computer systems. The game is for ages 6 and up.

== Gameplay ==
In Rugrats Mystery Adventures, players take on the role of Tommy Pickles, who works as a pint‑sized detective receiving clients in a moody, 1940s‑style office. Each mystery begins with a stylized noir introduction in which a client explains their problem and Tommy agrees to take the case. There are ten cases in total, each with a humorous title and a short, self‑contained mystery. To investigate a case, players travel either to the park with Didi or to "Home Heaven" with Stu. In each location, they must find an informant: a crying girl at the park or a boy with an Elvis‑style haircut in the store. The informant will not reveal clues until the player helps them first—such as locating a lost teddy bear for the girl or finding where the boy is hiding. Once the informant is satisfied, Tommy must trade Reptar Bars to get clues. Only three bars can be carried at a time; trying to collect more prompts the warning, "Dipie is full!" Each mystery unfolds through these small tasks and minigame‑style challenges, which grow progressively harder as players move through the adventure list. Though the mysteries themselves are simple, the emphasis is on playing through the games and completing each task.

== Reception ==
Reception

Review scores
Publication	Score
All Game Guide	4.5/5
Review Corner	8.8/10

Kids Domain said "Older children, unless they just absolutely adore the Rugrats, will find it much too easy".

Florida Today said "Although the software encourages general thinking skills, it doesn't focus on specific curriculum skills, and so it probably should be considered more healthy entertainment than educational".

Daily Herald said " Although the 10 mysteries are interesting, solve there them are the only two places to go to park or the Home Heaven hardware store"
