= Magic Fairy Tales: Barbie as Rapunzel =

1997 video game

- CD cover
- Developer: Media Station
- Publisher: Mattel Media
- Platforms: Macintosh, Windows, Windows 3.x
- Release: 1997
- Genres: Educational, adventure

Magic Fairy Tales: Barbie as Rapunzel is a 1997 educational adventure game developed by Media Station and published by Mattel Media.

== Summary ==
The game is an interactive storybook in which the player helps Princess Barbie rescue Prince Galen. It can be played either as a read-along book which skips all the puzzles, or as a storybook game. The player interacts with hotspots, collects items, and completes puzzles.

== Development ==
It was the first in Mattel Media's planned series of storybooks for girls. The game was designed to teach children early reading and decision-making skills. The first Barbie CD-ROM for both Macintosh and Windows, it was executive produced by Mattel Girls' software development director Nancie Martin.

== Critical reception ==
MacHome praised the game for not being as "sickeningly sweet" as it could have been. Review Corner felt the title was both enjoyable and responsive. All Game thought the game was an ideal product for young girls. SuperKids decided the title was not the best reading software on the market, but that it was an adequate product for its target market.

== See also ==
- List of Barbie video games
