= Barbie Beach Vacation =

2001 video game

- Developer: Krome Studios
- Publisher: Vivendi Universal Interactive Publishing
- Platform: Microsoft Windows
- Release: NA: 3 October 2001
- Genre: Action-adventure
- Mode: Single-player

Barbie Beach Vacation is a 2001 action-adventure video game within the Barbie franchise, developed by Krome Studios and published by Vivendi Universal Interactive Publishing.

== Reception ==
The game was noted for including "wonderful and pleasant" gaming aspects as a counterpoint to the more violent gameplay of contemporary male-targeted action titles.

== See also ==
- List of Barbie video games
