= Adventures with Barbie: Ocean Discovery =

1997 video game

- Developers: Gorilla Systems Corporation; Realtime Associates (Game Boy Color)
- Publisher: Mattel Media
- Platforms: Microsoft Windows; Game Boy Color
- Release: Microsoft Windows; 1997; Game Boy Color; May 1, 1999
- Genre: Adventure

Adventures with Barbie: Ocean Discovery is a 1997 video game developed by Gorilla Systems Corporation and published by Mattel Media for Windows. A version for the Game Boy Color developed by Realtime Associates was released in 1999, simply titled Barbie: Ocean Discovery.

The game was Mattel Media's first adventure game featuring the character Barbie. Its financial success led to Mattel Media producing further girl's games over the next few years.

== Gameplay ==
Gameplay involves swimming around the ocean as Barbie and solving puzzles in search of a sunken treasure.

The PC and GBC versions are slightly different; The dolphin plays a more significant role in Windows than it does in the Game Boy Color version.

== Critical reception ==
Entertainment Weekly felt the game was "underwhelming". The New York Times thought the game's mentions of Barbie's marine biology degree was a "nod toward enlightenment" for the girl's game genre, while From Barbie to Mortal Kombat: Gender and Computer Games thought the game saw the series branching out from the "true pink fluff" exemplified in titles like Barbie Fashion Designer. French reviewer PVG24 felt the game successfully penetrated the local market.

== Promotion ==
In a promo with Coca-Cola for its line of Barbie Software Products for Girls during the holiday season and into 1998, Mattel Media arranged a $5 coupon for Adventures with Barbie Ocean Discovery and Barbie Magic Hair Styler inside 12- and 24-packs of Coca-Cola "Santa Packs."

== See also ==
- List of Barbie video games
