= PokéROM =

- A Pikachu themed PokéROM
- Developer: Basis Applied Technology
- Publishers: NA: The Learning Company; EU: Mattel Interactive
- Platforms: Windows; Macintosh
- Release: July 2000
- Genre: Educational

PokéROM, also known as Pokémon PokéROM Gotta Learn 'em All! is a series of playable and collectable mini CD-ROMs developed by Basis Applied Technology and published by The Learning Company and Mattel Interactive in 2000. The product line was intended for a 5-11 year-old audience.

== Gameplay ==
The gameplay centers on the player using a series of Pokémon‑themed mini CDs that present more than 200 quizzes, questions, and puzzles in math, reading, and other subjects. Each disc features one of ten Pokémon and allows the player to view that Pokémon in its natural environment through an Observation Lab and a short slideshow. Professor Oak appears as the guide for the player's training program. At the Training Center, the player completes the Brain Trainer Exercise, a matching game built around math and reading questions. After finishing this activity, the player can enter the Pokémon Sanctuary to participate in trainer races against up to three opponents across five grade‑based levels.

== Development ==
PokéROM was showcased at Mattel Interactive's booth at E3 2000.

== Reception ==
Reception

Review score
Publication	Score
Discovery School	6.4/10

Kids Domain called PokéROM an inexpensive program that is guaranteed to be a hit with the kids. The Birmingham News recommended it to Pokémon fans. The Canadian Toy Testing Council gave PokéROM one star on a scale of three stars, two stars, one star, novelty, not recommended.
