= Barbie: Horse Ride & Rescue =

2026 video game

Barbie Horse Ride & Rescue
- Publisher: PikPok
- Release: Android, iOS; June 16, 2026

Barbie: Horse Ride & Rescue is a cozy equestrian mobile game developed by New Zealand video game company PikPok. It was made in collaboration with Mattel, the creators of Barbie.

== Gameplay ==
The game focuses on rescuing and caring for horses, while undertaking various equestrian activities. While the game has various adventure game elements, there is an additional focus on customisation and collection.

== Release ==
Barbie: Horse Ride & Rescue was featured in the Woman-Led Games showcase at Summer Game Fest 2026 prior to its release. The game released on June 16, 2026 on iOS and Android. A 2027 launch is expected on Switch 2 and PC.

== Reception ==
GamesRadar called the game reminiscient of the Barbie Horse Adventures series of games. Pocket Gamer's Catherine Dellosa described the game as fullfilling childhood fantasies, and complimented the soundtrack and the experience of riding the horses. Kotaku described the game as appealing to fans of cozy games in addition to Barbie fans.
