= Barbie Sparkling Ice Show =

2002 video game

- Developer: Krome Studios
- Publisher: Vivendi Universal Games
- Producer: David Gillespie
- Programmer: Daniel Krenn
- Composer: Castles Music Productions
- Platform: Microsoft Windows
- Release: NA: 15 November 2002
- Genre: Sports
- Mode: Single-player

Barbie Sparkling Ice Show is a 2002 video game within the Barbie franchise developed by Australian developer Krome Studios and published by Vivendi Universal Games for Windows.

== Reception ==
7Wolf wrote that the game was "pleasant - relaxing, and most importantly not annoying". EdutainingKids praised the engaging graphics and ability to be learnt quickly. Emily Aguilo-Perez of 2015 Strong Research Fellow wrote that the game was an example of how she observed "Barbie permeat[ing] children’s culture through...media".

It received a 'Recommended' from Parent's Choice for Winter 2002 Software.

== See also ==
- List of Barbie video games
