= Pokémon Project Studio =

- Red and Blue cover art
- Developer: Leisure Concepts
- Publishers: NA: The Learning Company; EU: Mattel Interactive
- Series: Pokémon
- Platform: Windows
- Release: NA: November 9, 1999; EU: 2000
- Genre: Educational
- Mode: Single-player

Pokémon Project Studio is a creation studio package for Microsoft Windows, released on November 9, 1999, in North America. It was licensed by Nintendo of America, Inc., developed by Leisure Concepts and published by The Learning Company, with their then-parent Mattel Interactive handling distribution and publication in Europe. The package has two versions, Pokémon Project Studio Red and Pokémon Project Studio Blue, and includes the Pokémon from the Game Boy games Pokémon Red and Blue along with art of human characters from the Pokémon anime series.

== Gameplay ==
From the main menu users can choose the type of media they wish to create including greeting cards, signs, birthday kits, banners, photos, stationery, envelopes, calendars, paper crafts, certificates and stickers. The user can use several included images and templates or they can import custom images into the picture. Each CD contains 81 different Pokémon. The kind of Pokémon they get depends on whether they are running the Red CD or the Blue CD. For example only the Red CD has Mewtwo, while Raichu only appears in the Blue CD.

== Educational goals ==
The package was targeted at families with the aim of introducing the Pokémon franchise to parents unfamiliar with it, while children enjoy exercising their creativity and imagination.

== Reception ==
Reception

Review scores
| Publication | Score |
|---|---|
| AllGame | 4/5 (Red); 4/5 (Blue) |
| Superkids | 4.1/5 (Blue) |
| FamilyPC | 90% (Blue) |

=== Critical reception ===
The game received favorable reviews, from parents and children alike. Kids Domain praised the game for its easy navigation and attractive look, while irritated by the inability to access the ready-made content. One disappointment highlighted by a PC Accelerator reviewer was the inability to use all the available Pokémon without having to swap CDs.

=== Commercial performance ===
In November 1999, the Red and Blue editions of Pokémon Studio were both among the top ten best-selling PC games of the month.

By mid-2000, Nintendo held a Pokemon ProjectROM Contest, which required contestants to write essays on their two Pokémon characters, with the prizes including the two Pokémon Project Studio CDs. Both the Red and Blue versions were also sold together as value packs. By December 2000, Hewlett-Packard sold DJ840C ink-jet printers with free copies of the games.
