= Ring Raiders =

- Title screen
- Created by: American Greetings
- Developed by: Phil Harnage
- Directed by: Will Meugniot; Kevin Altieri
- Voices of: Dan Gilvezan; Efrain Figueroa; Stuart Goetz; Ike Eisenmann; Gregory Martin; Jack Angel; Chris Anthony; Roscoe Lee Browne; Rodger Bumpass; Townsend Coleman; Chuck McCann; Susan Silo
- Country of origin: United States
- Original language: English
- No. of episodes: 5

Production
- Executive producers: Andy Heyward; Robby London
- Producer: Richard Raynis
- Running time: 22 minutes
- Production companies: American Greetings; Bohbot Entertainment; DIC Animation City

Original release
- Network: Syndication
- Release: September 16 – October 14, 1989

Ring Raiders is a 1989 animated television series based on a 1980s toyline made by Matchbox. The series began with a two-hour special by DIC Animation City, followed by one week of five half-hour episodes syndicated by Bohbot Entertainment.

== Synopsis ==
Set in the year 1998, the world is on the brink of a cataclysmic war. An organization dedicated to taking over the world, through the brutal use of aerial warfare, is about to realize its goal. It is known as the "Skull Squadron", founded by a band of renegades whose planes are capable of time travel. These pilots fall in love with the power they hold and see that they can use their planes to take control of the world. There are always pilots who, twisted by war's cruelties, are willing to join the Skull Squadron, causing it to grow bigger and more dangerous. In the 1990s, Skull Squadron is finally powerful enough to scramble for the master mission in its bid for world domination.

By now, almost too late, the great nations of the world are aware of Skull Squadron's plot. They band together to produce an aircraft that gives them a fighting chance against the onslaught—the Justice-class air carrier, which can travel through time. The carrier is outfitted with a small crew, and then sent back in time. The Justice crew gathers pilots and planes from historic air battles to train them to fight against the Skull Squadron.

A handful of pilots are selected as "Ring Commanders" to train and supervise the hundreds who remain. Ring Commanders are identified by their special signal ring, through which they can summon (or be summoned by) a fellow Ring Raider in times of need.

"Ring of Fire", "Scorch's Revenge", "All the Right Stuff", "The Best Man for the Job is a Woman" and "A Pilot's Faith" were all pilot episodes, but the series was never taken up as a full season show.

The animation art design was done by Peter Chung, based on the Those Characters From Cleveland art and toy designs of Mark Spangler and Jim Groman.

The show used the catchphrase "The command is in my hand" when characters wished to transform their planes, using their rings to make them more powerful. Their improved forms could only be held for a short time, or the pilot risked burning out their nervous system.

== Pilots and planes ==
=== Ring Raiders ===
- Victor Vector (voiced by Dan Gilvezan) was a stealth fighter squadron leader until 1993, when he was selected to command the first Justice-class air carrier and the Ring Raider squadrons. He is cool headed and always willing to risk his life for others.
  - As trainer-commander of the elite "Justice Wing", he pilots the Victory 1, a customized F-19 stealth fighter. The series and toyline were developed before the public revelation of the F-117.
- Yuri Kirkov (voiced by Gregory Paul Martin) was a solid, disciplined Soviet Air Force major and is now one the Ring Raiders' foremost squadron leaders. He defected from the Russians by surrendering to the USMC during the Vietnam War. Tough-minded and stern to a fault, Kirkov often takes himself too seriously, yet he can also be a very nice guy, if and when it comes to such. Kirkov is easily surprised by the "free and easy" standards of his fellow Ring Raiders; he constantly wonders to himself, "Is this any way to run an Air Force?"
  - As trainer-commander of "Freedom Wing", Kirkov pilots Kirkov's Comet, a customized F-4 Phantom II fighter-bomber. What makes Kirkov's Comet unique is its nose-mounted beam-cannon that it can cut up planes or blind opponents' infrared detection gear.
- Yinsu Yakamura (voiced by Townsend Coleman) was a space-fighter pilot picked up by a Justice-class air carrier in the year 2235. Computer educated, he is highly intelligent and knowledgeable about a wide range of subjects. With his past being the future, he is a natural expert on 20th Century technology. Yakamura possesses a high level of courage, and a deep sense of honor, to match his intellect.
  - As trainer-commander of "Honor Wing", Yakamura pilots the Samurai Flyer, a customized Grumman X-29 loaded with complex battle computers and miniature AWACS gear. Along with several tons of high-tech weaponry, the Samurai Flyer also carries a 3-D split-laser "Deceptor", which can cause 1–50 extra images to show up on radar scanners, so that Yakamura appears to have an entire squadron of Samurai Flyers backing him up.
- Joe Thundercloud (voiced by Efrain Figueroa) is a full-blooded Sioux (Native American) and was flying with the USAF in Korea when he was beamed aboard a Justice-class air carrier. By nature, Thundercloud is a reflective man of few words, which is why his fellow Ring Raiders always listen whenever he does speak up; with his keen mind and sense of strategy, there are few problems he cannot solve. In the air, he is always brave and tirelessly alert. He is known for his uncanny ability to "spot" enemies before they actually show up on radar.
  - As trainer-commander of "Thunder Wing", Thundercloud pilots the Arrowhead, a customized F-86 Sabre fighter/bomber loaded with special warpaint-design Sidewinder missiles. Arrowhead's modified power plant makes it capable of short speed bursts up to Mach 2.
- "Cub" Jones (voiced by Ike Eisenmann) was beamed aboard a Justice-class air carrier in 1943, having lied about his age so he could join the USN (Jones was only 16 at the time). He has more potential than most of the other Ring Raiders put together, in terms of mere flying ability. With his hot-tempered and cocky nature, there is much that he needs to learn. In World War II, Jones flew an F6F Hellcat.
  - As the trainer-commander of the "Courage Wing", he pilots the Sky Tiger, a customized Northrop F-5 interceptor. Of all the modifications done to this F-5, the most hazardous to Skull Squadron planes is its "Tigerclaw" missile system. Housed in Sky Tiger's forward underbelly, Tigerclaw is a retractable pod of 25 small missiles that can each be remote controlled by the plane's on-board computers for use against air, land or sea targets.
- Max Miles (voiced by Roscoe Lee Browne) is the head of Ring Raider intelligence. He makes dangerous flights into Skull Squadron territory, gathering information and photographs, to determine what the enemy air force's next steps might be. Known for a careful sense of planning, Miles prides himself on minimizing the risks to "Valor Wing" (which he trains and commands) on any mission, but to get his data, this strong and cool-headed pilot takes all kinds of chances himself. He has a dark sense of humor which makes him popular among the other Ring Raiders. Miles is no stranger to dogfights, either, but he specializes in night missions. In the toyline, Miles was Caucasian, but in the cartoon, he was redesigned to resemble his voice actor Roscoe Lee Browne.
  - He pilots the Knight Fighter, a customized SR-71 Blackbird strategic recon jet.
- "Never" Evers is aptly nicknamed, since he never turns down any assignment regardless of how risky it may be. When other Ring Raiders don't want a mission because is too dangerous, they call Evers, who would not have it any other way. He is cocky, and with little respect for authority, Evers has been known to disobey a direct order when he thought his superiors were "being too cautious". He never flies anywhere without loud rock n' roll blasting away in his cockpit. Despite his penchant for bending procedures, and even breaking safety rules, he is a highly capable wingman in the crunch. He did not appear in the cartoon or the toyline.
  - Evers pilots the Fearless Falcon, a customized F-16 fighter equipped with a special fuel-nozzle that allows it to train un-ignited fuel in the face of pursuing Skull Squadron planes. When Evers' afterburner is kicked in, the pursuer finds himself in a hot spot, and the Fearless Falcon finds itself miles away, almost instantly.
- "Salty" Salton was a United States Marine Corps World War II flying ace who was beamed aboard a Justice-class air carrier while working as the director of his own flying circus. He is rough, tough and usually gruff to the younger Ring Raiders. He frequently trades verbal abuse with "Never" Evers in particular. Salton has forgotten more about dogfighting, and about air-sea combat in particular, than many of his fellow Ring Raiders know. He thinks anybody who depends on radar and computers ought to just stay down on deck. Despite all his bluster, Salton backs it up with good flying ability. Salton refuses to trade in his old Corsair, souped-up though it may be, for a plane that would bring him into the jet age. Salton did not appear in the cartoon or the toyline.
  - He pilots the Sea Dragon, a customized F4U Corsair fighter that can split its gull-shaped wings, dragonfly-style, doubling its speed and firepower. With all this, in a dogfight, Sea Dragon seems to actually breathe fire.
- Baron Von Claudeitz (voiced by Chuck McCann) is a cantankerous World War I Imperial German fighter pilot. Like "Salty" Salton, Von Claudeitz thinks his fellow pilots rely too much on technology, as seen in the episode "A Pilot's Faith". He retains his original (modified) aircraft, a Fokker Dr.I, but also piloted an Messerschmitt Me 262 on one occasion. He is meant as an homage to the famous German flying ace Manfred von Richthofen (aka the Red Baron), who is considered the ace-of-aces of World War I. The Baron existed only in the cartoon and the UK edition of the 1990 Ring Raiders Annual and was not in the comic book or the toyline.
- Jenny Gail (voiced by Chris Anthony) is the highest-ranking female Ring Raider. A fully-trained doctor, she pulled double-duty as a helicopter pilot in the Vietnam War. Gail has had to deal with the distrustful attitude of Baron Von Claudeitz, who is biased against women in general, as he thinks they should leave the dogfighting to men. She often flies rings around the Skull Squadron, somehow making them look like amateurs almost without trying. She existed only in the cartoon and was not in the comic book or the toyline.
  - She pilots a futuristic, jet-boosted medevac helicopter, one not based on any real-world design, called Nightingale.
- fleet of Justice-class air-carriers
- network of sky-bases (Courage, Freedom, Honor, Thunder, Valor, et al)

=== Skull Squadrons ===
- Stanley "Scorch" Smith (voiced by Rodger Bumpass) is the founder and director of the Skull Squadron. This fighter-tactics master knows every feint and trick—dirty and otherwise—under the sky. He is a relentless dogfighter who remains to be bested or outmaneuvered. Scorch wants to take out Victor Vector, whom he blames for the burns that cover his left arm and his left face (hence his skull-like mask).
  - As trainer-leader of the elite "Ambush Wing", Scorch pilots Scorch's Torch, a customized Saab Viggen fighter-interceptor that houses a full arsenal of incendiary weapons and electronic countermeasures.
- Hubbub (voiced by Stuart Goetz) is a punk rocker who loves to create chaos wherever he goes. Heavily into electronics, he uses the myriad high-tech devices in his plane to baffle and confuse the Ring Raider squadrons. He is also a master at vocal impressions, and at locking onto Ring Raider frequencies to imitate a Ring Commander's voice issuing false orders. He is a tough but unconventional aerial combatant, basically a street-thug of the air.
  - As trainer-leader of "Rebel Wing", Hubbub pilots the Zapmaster, a customized Dassault Mirage III equipped with lightning capacitators that can electrify an entire cloud at the touch of a thumb trigger.
- Cutthroat is the Skull Squadrons' "spy pilot". A master of disguise and duplicity, Cutthroat is a constantly-dreaded yet grudgingly-respected threat to Ring Raider security. In a dogfight, he is likely to show up almost anywhere with little or no warning. Whether striking inside Ring Raider headquarters, or at 55,000 feet, Cutthroat's favorite attack is the classic knife-in-the-back ambush. Cutthroat did not appear in the toyline.
  - He pilots the Bayonet, a customized F19A stealth fighter.
- Siren (voiced by Susan Silo) is the only female Skull Squadron leader. Her MiG-25 is armed with a complete arsenal of powerful sonic weapons. Siren existed solely in the cartoon; neither she nor her plane were a part of the comic book or the toyline.
- Chiller is among the most feared Skull Squadron pilots. Cold and ruthless, Chiller is also known for brooding, being a man with some dark secret that he is unable and/or unwilling to share with anyone else. He is a loner in the sky, too, preferring solo surprise attacks on straggling Ring Raiders.
  - As trainer-leader of "Bandit Wing", Chiller pilots the Ice Machine, a customized Lockheed F-104 Starfighter with an arsenal of unusual "ice" weapons, which includes a modified thermal-reverse beam gun that can freeze-dry anything up to a mile away.
- Slingshot (aka Shooter) lives by the old saying "shoot first and ask questions later" and he is an airborne desperado who goes for action. He did not appear in the toyline.
  - He pilots the Sixgun, a customized A-10 Thunderbolt II packed full of enough sophisticated weaponry to keep a whole air force at bay and Slingshot knows how to use all of it with unmatched precision. With six miniature turbo-jet engines to fire all at once, the Sixgun can jump over the top of Mach 2 for spring-loaded getaways and surprise attacks.
- Mako (voiced by Jack Angel) is a Skull Squadron tracker. He is normally cold and methodical, but when he is on the verge of a strike, he goes into a state of frenzied excitement, which makes escape from his gun sights almost impossible. Mako thinks nothing of holding a grudge either; he will search the skies and the seven seas for anyone who has crossed him, particularly his former wingman, Yuri Kirkov.
  - As trainer-leader of "Vicious Wing", Mako pilots the Sea Hunter, a customized MiG-29 specially adapted for sea duty. Sea Hunter is equipped with CADS (Computer-Aided Dimensional Sonar), as well as high-tech armaments. Moreover, the Sea Hunter gives literal meaning to the expression "flying fish", as it is capable of operating underwater.
- Wraith (aka Wraither) has been spotted among the Skull Squadron flyers since World War II. Some say this deadly dogfighter is actually just a flight suit handed down from one Skull Squadron pilot to another, but those who have dueled with him and the Galloping Ghoul, his ghostly P-51 Mustang, they are sure that neither Wraith nor the Ghoul are of this world. When the skull visor is lifted on his helmet, there is no face behind it.
  - Wraith is the trainer-leader of "Vulture Wing". The Galloping Ghoul carries more than a ton of serious combat equipment, and is able to disappear into thin air and reappear, which gives it a tactical edge when taking on much-faster Ring Raiders. The name of his plane, the Galloping Ghoul, which is a P-51 Mustang, is likely a reference to The Galloping Ghost, a real-life P-51 that was used in air races.
- Blackjack specializes in night attacks and is the most daring member of the Skull Squadron, taking chances that most people in their right mind would never take.
  - As trainer-leader of "Havoc Wing", Blackjack pilots the Battle Bird, a customized Hawker Siddeley Harrier "jump jet" that is loaded with special night-combat gear. In addition to more than four tons of carry-on arms, the Battle Bird is equipped with an invisible infrared beam that detects objects in the dark, flashing them, in living-daylight colors, onto a 3-D view screen inside Blackjack's cockpit.
- fleet of Ambush-class air-carriers (second wave; never made it to stores)
- network of sky-bases (Bandit, Havoc, Rebel, Vicious, Vulture, et al)

== Episodes ==
No.	Title	Written by	Original release date
1	"Ring of Fire"	Phil Harnage	September 16, 1989
Cub Jones, a novice US Navy pilot from World War II, is recruited by the Ring Raiders when the Skull Squadron emerges in his era. The plot of the first episode is Cub's rescue from peril at the hands of the Skulls and initiation into the Raiders and the subsequent mission as the Skulls' delayed-reaction weapon sets off volcanoes all around the world.
2	"The Best Man for the Job is a Woman"	Pat Allee and Ben Hurst	September 23, 1989
Jenny Gail must focus on rescuing the other Ring Raiders when they are in trouble and prove she is a capable pilot.
3	"Scorch's Revenge"	Phil Harnage	September 30, 1989
Scorch, real name Stanley Smith, attended the Top Flight Academy with Victor Vector, who scarred Scorch's face after a challenge to see who the better pilot was. Seeking revenge, Scorch kidnaps Jenny Gail and challenges Vector to discover who is the better pilot and stop Jenny from being sent to the Jurassic Period.
4	"All the Right Stuff"	Mike O'Mahony	October 7, 1989
In the year 2038, Yinsu Yakamura was a member of the World Air Force and rescued astronauts in a space shuttle from a meteor shower. He also tried to rescue an alien life form on the shuttle, but the meteor shower was too strong. The Justice air carrier rescued him as he was crash landing and a starflyer became his alien pet parrot. Also in this episode, Scorch time travels to 2020 to steal a satellite that will enable him to take over the world. The Ring Raiders escape to Kansas in the year 1860 in order to prevent the Skull Squadron from attacking them. Yinsu suggests that the Ring Raiders travel to Edwards Air Force Base in the year 2023 to get a Gamma 2 Space Fighter to help defeat Scorch.
5	"A Pilot's Faith"	Bob Forward	October 14, 1989
A mysterious plague is striking the world and the Ring Raiders have been asked to deliver a cure for it. Cub Jones learns he must rely on his pilot's instincts rather than technology when the Justice air carrier autopilot is out of commission.

== Home media ==
The episode "Ring of Fire" was released as an American VHS tape. The tape included a special silver-painted Ring Raider plane. The tape also featured commercials for Ring Raiders products – some before the episode, some in the middle of the episode where commercials would have gone on the air.

In the United Kingdom, a PAL VHS tape was released containing "Scorch's Revenge" and "All The Right Stuff".

== Toyline ==
The Ring Raiders toyline consisted primarily of small (3–4 centimeters long) plastic toy planes mounted on plastic rings via a detachable display stand. The stands allowed the aircraft a small degree of mobility. Relatively few molds were produced for the toyline; most of the aircraft were repainted three or four times each.

The line was rather short lived, lasting about six months.

=== Wing Packs ===
The bulk of the toy release consisted of packs of four aircraft, each squadron sporting their own distinctive color scheme. No two packs had exactly the same aircraft in them, but several had three shared aircraft.

Twelve packs were released, six Ring Raiders and six Skull Squadron.

=== Battle Packs ===
These packs consisted of two aircraft, one Skull Squadron and one Ring Raider. The aircraft were simply repackaged versions of ones that had previously been sold in Wing packs.

Towards the end of the line, these packs were sold bundled with other items from the line.

=== Bases ===
Four bases were released as a part of the line, three Ring Raiders and one Skull Squadron.

The Air Carrier Justice was the largest single item in the line; it was a massive Flying Wing design, resembling a scaled-up version of the YB-49.

The Skybase Freedom and Skybase Courage were two smaller bases. Both were able to connect to the Justice. The two bases were of similar design, and their toys shared almost all of their parts, albeit recolored.

The Skull Squadron Mobile Base was a heavily armed and armored flying fortress. The toy was based on the same design as the Freedom/Courage and shared about half the parts.

=== Battle Blasters ===
A pair of accessories, these toys consisted of a soundbox shaped like a flight stick that was worn around the wrist. It had three sound effects (jet engine, cannon and missile launch), each triggered by a separate button.

Two versions were produced, one Ring Raiders and one Skull Squadron. Both were virtually identical, save for the color scheme. The Skull Squadron version played a "revving" sound when it was started up, but apart from this it was identical to its Ring Raiders counterpart.

=== Action Packs ===
Released at the end of the line, these are probably the rarest items in the Ring Raiders line. These packs consisted of eight aircraft, four from each side. The aircraft were a mixture of previously released molds and new ones that had not yet been featured, and all had new color schemes.

== Featured aircraft ==
The Ring Raiders toyline featured an array of aircraft dating from World War II to the present day, including the then-"Futuristic" designs. With the exception of the fictional Nightingale helicopter, airborne aircraft carriers and both Monogram and Testors versions of the F-19 Stealth Fighter model kits, all were based on real aircraft. Almost all of the designs featured were Western (specifically American) aircraft.

Real-life aircraft in the toyline include:

- P-51 Mustang
- F4U Corsair
- F-86 Sabre
- F-104 Starfighter
- F-4 Phantom II
- F-5 Tiger II
- F-16 Falcon
- A-10 Thunderbolt II
- SR-71 Blackbird
- X-29
- Harrier
- Mirage III
- Saab 37 Viggen
- MiG-29 Fulcrum

The cartoon featured numerous other aircraft that were not featured in the toyline, including the Fokker Dr.I, MiG-25, and A6M Zero and futuristic space-planes.

In Europe, a second line of Ring Raiders toys was released. Though no new characters were affiliated with the new aircraft squadrons, their colors bore immense similarities to those of the previous series. Brand new aircraft included the F6F Hellcat, F7U Cutlass, BAE Hawk, Me 262, B-58 Hustler, Tu-22, MiG-21, B-1 Lancer, C-130 Hercules, and Handley Page Victor.

== Comic book ==
A Ring Raiders comic book was published by Fleetway Publications in mid-1989. The comic was published fortnightly and ran for six issues. Rather than running self-contained stories, each issue would run 5–6 serialised stories. One of these was usually a one-shot featuring the origin story of one of the featured characters.

Like the TV series and the toyline, the comic was short-lived. It was abruptly cancelled at the sixth issue, with most stories ending in cliffhangers. Save for a brief notice on the letters page stating this was happening "beyond our control", there was no indication that this was a final issue aside from the "Next issue" boxes at the end of each story now being blank.

Fleetway later released a big, thick special edition the following year around March, which concluded all the stories which had been left hanging and included another origin story. Also included were "mini posters" which were the already completed covers for what would have been the next few issues, and a couple of the airplane fact-files which had also already been completed for publication.

The comic followed a different continuity from the cartoon series. The characters looked rather different from their animated counterparts, with several having radically different origin stories, tying in more with the original toyline on which the comic and cartoon were based.

- Ring Raiders Annual 1989 ISBN 0-86227-682-9
- Ring Raiders Annual 1990 ISBN 978-0-86227-778-9

== Trivia ==
Like Saban's Adventures of the Little Mermaid, Masked Rider and the English dub version of the Dragon Quest anime, most of the music composed by Shuki Levy in this cartoon was later reused for the English dub Saban versions of the first two seasons of Digimon.
