= Picrew =

Japanese virtual avatar maker

- Website type: Layered image creator
- Available in: Japanese, English, and Korean
- Country of origin: Japan
- Owner: TetraChroma
- Website: picrew.me/en
- Commercial: Yes
- Registration: Optional
- Launched: December 2018; 7 years ago

Picrew is a Japanese layered paper doll-style avatar maker website. It was initially developed by two staff of the Japanese company TetraChroma in July 2017, and officially released in December 2018.

== Overview ==
The website's concept and interface have some similarities to earlier avatar editing systems, including Nintendo's Mii avatars and WeeWorld's WeeMee, and the longer history of digital paper doll games such as Kisekae Set System.

Picrew has become popular with audiences outside of Japan, with the simplicity of the image maker and the potential for users to contribute their own Picrew avatar maker illustrations through a Picrew creator. Picrew sets some restrictions in its terms of use, including the prohibition of re-distribution of the images created through Picrew image makers. Individual creators control some of the rights to the resulting images from their image makers.

== Specs ==
Image makers on Picrew are 600 by 600 pixels with the square 1:1 aspect ratio. Since October 31, 2023, image makers are now also available in "Tatanaga size", an aspect ratio of 9:16 for a canvas size of 540 by 960 pixels. Each image maker may have up to 50 layers and parts, and up to 750 items in total. Parts may have multiple layers assigned to them, may contain any number of items, and up to 18 variations of each item (minimum of 1 variation per part, with the option to add up to 17 extra variations).
