= Barbie: Magic Genie Adventure =

2000 video game

- Developer: Vicarious Visions
- Publisher: Mattel Interactive
- Producer: Dyan Daglas
- Designer: Jeff Goodwin
- Programmers: Jeff Goodwin; Stephen Brooks; Alex Rybakov
- Artists: Stephen Brooks; Jorge Diaz
- Writers: Stephen Brooks; Alex Rybakov
- Composer: Manfred Linzner
- Platform: Game Boy Color
- Release: NA: November 11, 2000
- Genre: Action-adventure
- Mode: Single-player

Barbie: Magic Genie Adventure is a single-player adventure/action game developed by Vicarious Visions and published by Mattel Interactive. It was released on the Game Boy Color on November 1, 2000.

== Plot ==
The plot is that "an evil genie named Kardal has stolen the magic lamps from four of Barbie's friends. As Barbie, players attempt to recover the lamps by visiting five mystical cities" "filled with mystery and danger as you gather magic powers and abilities to help you on your journey" Then, "once Barbie has found all four lamps, she'll need to confront Kardal from inside his palace".

== Gameplay ==
Scott Alan Marriott of All Game Guide explains the gameplay: "Each activity is a mini-game played on one of three difficulty levels. By playing an activity on a harder setting, players can unlock new carpets or the ability to cast spells. Activities alternate between action sequences and puzzles."

The game came with a 28-page Instruction Manual, featured three difficulty settings, and progress was able to be resumed via passwords.

== Critical reception ==
Nintendo Power gave the game a rating of 6.6/10. AllGameGuide gave the game a rating of 2.5/5 stars.

== See also ==
- List of Barbie video games
