= Barbie Generation Girl: Gotta Groove =

1999 video game

- Developer: Stunt Puppy Entertainment
- Publisher: Mattel Media
- Platform: Windows
- Release: 1999
- Genre: Action
- Mode: Single-player

Barbie Generation Girl: Gotta Groove is a 1999 video game with dress-up elements developed by Stunt Puppy Entertainment and published by Mattel Media. It is a Barbie-licensed video game where players assist Barbie and her friends, the Generation Girls, to perform a live stage show by choosing dance moves, outfits and stage elements.

== Gameplay ==
Gameplay screenshot

The objective of Gotta Groove is to design dance routines for Barbie and her friends to perform on a stage. The game features a object-oriented design where players select dance moves from a selection of cards and assemble them in the order desired for the performance routine. Players can also select Barbie's clothes and set design, featuring 300 different possible combinations of outfits and patterns. Other attributes of the performance can be customised, including the camera angles, lighting effects, and which performers are singing. Gotta Groove features several game modes: the 'Practice Room', to set up performances, 'Dance Challenge', where new move cards can be obtained by matching cards to the performed moves depicted, and 'The Big Show', where designed shows are performed.

== Reception ==
Reception

Review scores
Publication	Score
AllGame	3.5/5
Superkids	3.7/5

Gotta Groove was commercially successful, peaking in fifth position for US sales charts for November 1999, according to PC Data. (Note: Other sources say December 1999.)

The game received average reviews. Describing Gotta Groove as featuring "great graphics and sound, popular characters and opportunities for creativity", Superkids considered the game featured creative elements that were educational for girls and easy for a child to use, although observed children were disappointed by the lack of outfits and choreography. Allgame similarly considered the game would "inspire imagination" for young girls interested in dancing and featured a range of dance moves, but felt the execution of graphics and music was awkward due to a "weak" range of options for set design, and "poorly designed" shows due to "jagged looking graphics and poor music co-ordination". Several reviewers satirically discussed the game, including Old Man Murray, who wrote the game was derivative of Dance Dance Revolution and "making simulated dancing games safe for white suburban girls", and Kotaku writing the game as an essential Barbie title, stating the game design was surrealistic and "entertaining out-of-body experience".
