= Barbie Horse Adventures =

Series of video games based on Mattel's Barbie line of dolls

- Genres: Adventure, children's, role-playing
- Publishers: Vivendi Universal Games; Activision
- Platforms: Game Boy Advance, Nintendo DS, PlayStation 2, Windows, Wii, Xbox
- First release: Barbie Horse Adventures: Blue Ribbon Race; September 17, 2003
- Latest release: Barbie Horse Adventures: Riding Camp; October 21, 2008

Barbie Horse Adventures is a series of video games based on Mattel's Barbie line of dolls. The series is aimed at children and involves various aspects of equestrianism.

== Gameplay ==
Players take on the roles of Barbie as well as other members of Barbie's friends and family. Settings range from natural (hills and woodlands) to artificial (horse ranches and racetracks).

Gameplay is based around various aspects of equestrianism, with the precise activities varying from game to game in the series. Players tame, feed, groom, and train horses. Horses may become lost, whereupon players will have to find them. The central part of gameplay, though, is riding horses by various methods, including trick riding and participation in horse racing. Players may be attacked by hostile animals such as porcupines and skunks.

Additional non-equestrian gameplay is provided by customizing the player character, who typically gets a large and diverse wardrobe with which to play dress-up.

== Games in the series ==
The games in the table below are listed in chronological order by release date. In addition to the games in this table, the equestrianism-based gameplay of Barbie Riding Club (1998) and Barbie: Race & Ride (1999) make them spiritual predecessors to the Barbie Horse Adventures series.

Title	Release date	Platforms
Barbie Horse Adventures: Blue Ribbon Race	September 17, 2003	Game Boy Advance
Barbie Horse Adventures: Mystery Ride	September 23, 2003	Microsoft Windows
Barbie Horse Adventures: Wild Horse Rescue	November 4, 2003	PlayStation 2, Xbox
Barbie Horse Adventures: Riding Camp	October 21, 2008	Microsoft Windows, Nintendo DS, PlayStation 2, Wii

=== Blue Ribbon Race ===
Barbie Horse Adventures: Blue Ribbon Race
- Developers: Blitz Games; Möbius Entertainment
- Publisher: Vivendi Universal Games
- Platform: Game Boy Advance
- Release: NA: September 17, 2003
- Genres: Action-adventure, racing
- Mode: Single-player

Barbie Horse Adventures: Blue Ribbon Race is the first game of the Barbie Horse Adventures video game series based on the Barbie line of dolls by Mattel. The game was released on the Game Boy Advance in 2003.

The player takes on the role of Barbie and races horses through various tracks of the Primrose Hill Charity Cup. To complete the tracks successfully, Barbie has to collect items along the way.

Unlike all later games in the Barbie Horse Adventures series, Blue Ribbon Race used 2-D sprites instead of 3-D graphics. The camera used an isometric viewpoint. The game supported multiplayer play by allowing two players to compete in minigames. Barbie can change into several different sets of clothing, enabling her to play dress-up.

=== Mystery Ride ===
Barbie Horse Adventures: Mystery Ride
- Developer: Blue Monkey Studios
- Publishers: Vivendi Universal Games; Activision
- Platform: Microsoft Windows
- Release: NA: September 23, 2003
- Genres: Action game, adventure game, children's game, racing game, roleplaying game
- Mode: Single-player

Barbie Horse Adventures: Mystery Ride is the second game of the Barbie Horse Adventures video game series based on the Barbie line of dolls by Mattel. The game was released on Microsoft Windows in 2003.

The plot involves Barbie having to solve the mystery of the missing horse of Barbie's friend Teresa. To do so, the player, as Barbie, has to explore the countryside, consisting of varied terrain ranging from forest to desert, while solving logic puzzles.

Mystery Ride is the first game in the Barbie Horse Adventures series to use 3-D graphics. The core gameplay is based around equestrianism, including feeding, grooming, and training horses. Barbie can also change into several different sets of clothing, enabling her to play dress-up.

Common Sense Media gave Mystery Ride 4 out of 5 stars, complimenting the horse riding as "amazingly realistic" and saying that the game overall was "very satisfying to play".

=== Wild Horse Rescue ===
Barbie Horse Adventures: Wild Horse Rescue
- Developer: Blitz Games
- Publisher: Vivendi Universal Games
- Director: Phil Drinkwater
- Producer: Team Banshee
- Programmers: Chris Fry; Matthew Hayward; Rob Grant; Carl Warwick
- Composers: John Guscott; Matt Black
- Platforms: PlayStation 2, Xbox
- Release: NA: November 4, 2003; EU: December 2003
- Genre: Adventure
- Mode: Single-player

Barbie Horse Adventures: Wild Horse Rescue is an adventure video game developed by Blitz Games and published by Vivendi Universal Games. It is the third game in the Barbie Horse Adventures video game series based on the Barbie line of dolls by Mattel. The game was released for PlayStation 2 and Xbox in 2003 with a GameCube port also planned, but cancelled.

Barbie Horse Adventures: Wild Horse Rescue is an adventure game played from a third-person perspective. A storm comes in and causes the gate at a ranch to open, letting horses and foals run away. Barbie must track down the foals and horses through 3 parts of 3 different settings: the forest, the mountains, and the beach. There is an average of three foals plus one horse that can be found at the end of the section. In the 2nd part of the section, a missing horse will be found by someone else, and Barbie must race them.

The game has been heavily criticized by the gaming press. X-Play dubbed it a Game You Should Never Buy next to Monster Garage: The Game and Big Rigs: Over the Road Racing. In the episode, X-Play co-host Morgan Webb called Barbie Horse Adventures: Wild Horse Rescue the worst game ever made, and continues to reference it so in ongoing episodes after giving the terrible review of having a 1 out of 5. IGN gave it a 4/10 rating, and XGP Gaming rating it a 4 out of 10.

Decent reviews, which mainly point out that the game was being geared towards children, were given out by TeamXbox (3.8/5) and the British Official Xbox Magazine (6.7/10).

=== Riding Camp ===
Barbie Horse Adventures: Riding Camp
- Developer: Pixel Tales
- Publisher: Activision
- Platforms: PlayStation 2, Nintendo DS, Wii, Windows
- Release: NA: October 21, 2008
- Genres: Adventure, role-playing
- Mode: Single-player

Barbie Horse Adventures: Riding Camp is an adventure role-playing video game developed by Pixel Tales and published by Activision. It is the fourth game in the Barbie Horse Adventures video game series based on the Barbie line of dolls by Mattel. The game was released worldwide for PlayStation 2, Nintendo DS, Wii and Windows in 2008.

Barbie Horse Adventures: Riding Camp is an adventure role-playing game set in an open world environment and played from a third-person perspective. The player takes the role of Barbie on an island which has been the victim of a storm. The game is free-form in a sandbox world, allowing the player to take part in a wide range of activities.

The core gameplay is based around equestrianism: players tame, feed, groom, and train horses of various breeds.

As Barbie, the player has the option of completing various quests given to her by the denizens of the island, such as finding lost items or fixing broken objects. Travel over the island is on horseback. The player can participate in timed horse races and can also buy diverse sets of clothing, enabling Barbie to play dress-up.

IGN noted that though it was not a sophisticated game, it was a good game for its target audience of young girls.

== See also ==
- List of Barbie video games
