= Barbie Super Sports =

1999 video game

Barbie: Super Sports
- Developer: Runecraft
- Publishers: NA: Mattel Media; EU: Sony Computer Entertainment
- Platforms: PlayStation, Windows
- Release: PlayStation: NA: 30 December 1999; UK: 21 April 2000; Windows: NA: 21 April 2001
- Genre: Sports
- Modes: Single-player, multiplayer

Barbie: Super Sports is a sports video game developed by Runecraft and published by Mattel Media for the PlayStation and Microsoft Windows. Players can choose to play as either Barbie, Teresa, Christie or Kira. Two sports are available: snowboarding and roller skating.

== Gameplay ==
The PC version of the game consists of two sports, roller-blading and snowboarding. Upon selecting your name, character of choice (either Barbie, Teresa, Christie or Kira) your character appears in a shop where you buy your outfit for skating or snowboarding. Upon exiting the shop you get sent into a lobby where you get to enter four stages. Each four stages have a finish line which can only be reached by finishing certain criteria (i.e. collecting a certain number of points) Within the stages you can get tickets which you can later use in the shop.

== Reception ==
Reception

Review score
Publication	Score
FamilyPC	85%

The Canadian Toy Testing Council gave Barbie Super Sports three stars on a scale of three stars, two stars, one star, novelty, not recommended.

== See also ==
- List of Barbie video games
