= Barbie Riding Club =

1998 video game

- CD-ROM cover for the game
- Developer: Human Code
- Publisher: Mattel Media
- Platform: Windows
- Release: October 1998

Barbie Riding Club is a 1998 video game developed by American studio Human Code and published by Mattel Media. It is a Barbie-licensed game in which players join a riding club, care for horses, and explore the trails in Secret Valley with Barbie. Players can feed, wash, and brush their horses, and they can race against fellow riding club members Christie and Teresa. When players ride a horse, the game switches to a first-person view showing Barbie's perspective, looking over the horse's ears. The player sees the horse's head bob up and down to simulate horseback-riding, and the sound of hoofbeats plays in the background. As players explore Secret Valley with Barbie, they can follow clues and complete puzzles to learn about a mysterious wild horse living in the valley. The game was developed for young children ages 4 to 10.

Upon release, Barbie Riding Club was one of the top-selling computer games for Windows in the United States and was part of a growing trend of new girls' video games. Reviewers at the time praised the game's horseback-riding simulation and its appeal to younger audiences, while some were critical of the graphics quality. Looking back on the game over 20 years later, critics said that Barbie Riding Club "raised a generation of horse girls".

== Gameplay ==
Barbie Riding Club takes place in Secret Valley, a collection of trails that run through a forest and a beach and connect to a horse stable. Barbie and her friends Christie and Teresa run a riding club in the valley. At the start of the game, players create a membership card to join the club; membership cards represent game saves. After they join, players can name and care for four horses in the stable: a dapple gray, a white horse, a paint horse, and a Palomino. Horse names are chosen from a set list of names, and Barbie will say whichever name the player picks. Players can use their mouse cursor to feed their horse apples, carrots, strawberries, or sugar cubes, and they can also wash and brush their horse by clicking on a sponge or currycomb and dragging it over the horse. Before they leave the stable, players can drag horse tack—saddle pad, saddle, and bridle—onto their horse.

The game has three types of missions: adventure missions, certificate missions, and rescue missions. Players can start adventure and certificate missions using the bulletin board in the stable. To start an adventure mission, players click on a hand-written note posted by Christie or Teresa, which contains a clue about a mysterious horse in Secret Valley and directs players to complete minigame puzzles with Barbie. As players finish these objectives, Christie and Teresa post thank you notes on the bulletin board. Similarly, certificate missions also appear on the bulletin board and correspond with in-game milestones. Certificates are awarded whenever the player cares for horses or helps other riding club members. Rescue missions are assigned using the in-game interactive pager. Christie and Teresa will call whenever they need help with an issue while out on the trail. They will also call whenever they want to challenge the player to a race, or players can start a race themselves by clicking on the purple "RACE!" button on the pager. During a race, the game enters a side-scrolling mode, where Barbie races Christie in the forest or Teresa on the beach from left to right.

Screenshot showing the first-person horseback-riding perspective, with logs blocking the trail ahead

Whenever players go out on the trails in Secret Valley—whether on a mission or to explore on their own—the gameplay switches to first-person from Barbie's perspective. As players ride their horse as Barbie, they peer over the horse's ears, and the screen bobs to simulate riding, while the sound of hoofbeats plays in the background. The horse will leap over obstacles in the trail like fallen logs, and players use the left and right mouse buttons to speed up or slow down. Barbie can dismount and look around anywhere on the trail, and, at predetermined locations, she can explore areas near the trail to find clues about the mysterious horse and a family who used to live in Secret Valley. Landmarks on the trail are used to help players find and complete adventure missions. Players can open the in-game map and click on a trail sign to start a ride from that location. Players also have a saddlebag that stores mission notes and items they find in Secret Valley.

As players complete quests and races in the game, they are awarded rescue badges, racing ribbons, and certificates to mark their progress. Awards are tracked in the riding club handbook and can be printed using an in-game menu. The handbook also includes information about the "unique histories and personalities" of the horses.

== Development and release ==
Barbie Riding Club was developed by Human Code—a game studio based in Austin, Texas—and published by Mattel Media in 1998. Mattel was involved throughout the development process to ensure that Barbie's appearance in the game matched the doll. Barbie was voiced by Chris Anthony Lansdowne, who voiced the character throughout the 90s. Kimberly Brooks voiced Christie, and Sylvia Villagran voiced Teresa. At Mattel, Cynthia Woll was the executive producer, and novelist Matt Costello wrote the story for the game. At Human Code, Jacquie Moss was the executive producer and creative director; Chris Mead was the art director, specifically working on the 3D horse and doll animations; Mike DeLeon was audio lead; and Michelle Renèe Lahoff was the lead programmer. In an interview with The Austin Chronicle in 1999, Marie Meinert, a producer at Human Code who worked on the game, said Barbie Riding Club and similar titles were part of a "first generation" of original games for girls. The game was designed for children as young as 4 or 5 and up to age 10.

The Barbie Riding Club CD-ROM came with the ability to add a virtual pet horse to the desktop, which could be cared for while the game was closed. This feature was developed in partnership with Gorilla Systems Corporation, which went on to work with Mattel on other PC games like Detective Barbie in the Mystery of the Carnival Caper.

The game was showcased by Mattel Media at E3 1998 and released in October 1998. Upon release, it ran on Windows 95 and Windows 98 operating systems. A "sister" PlayStation version of Barbie Riding Club called Barbie: Race & Ride was developed and published in 1999.

== Reception ==
=== Sales ===
In the United States, Barbie Riding Club took #1 on PC Data's computer game sales rankings in its opening week. It debuted on the monthly charts in second place for November 1998, a position it held in December. According to PC Data, Barbie Riding Club was the 15th top-selling computer game on Windows in the United States in 1998. Sales for "games for girls" like Barbie Riding Club increased from 518,542 individual units in 1997 to 1,021,857 in 1998, representing a year-over-year change of 97%. Mattel created "tie-ins" on their website and started advertising these games on television for the first time in 1998.

However, not every aspect of the game's commercial strategy was a success. In September 1999, Mattel bundled Barbie Riding Club and 19 other programs with a new silver desktop computer with "pink and purple floral accents" called the Barbie PC. Mattel faced criticism for including more educational titles in the boys' version of the PC (a Hot Wheels edition) versus the girls' Barbie version. Dana Henry, a spokesperson from Mattel, responded that both PCs had almost the same number of programs, but the girls' PC had to make room for all of the popular Barbie titles. The manufacturer of the PCs, Patriot Computers, had to delay shipments of the Barbie PC bundles during the 1999 holiday season due to defective power supplies. Ultimately, the manufacturer failed to deliver 3,100 Barbie and Hot Wheels PCs and went bankrupt the following year.

=== Critical reception ===
Reception

Review scores
Publication	Score
All Game Guide	3.5/5 (Note: Overall score was 3.5/5. Subscores include Graphics (2/5), Sound (3/5), and Enjoyment (3/5), Replay Value (4.5/5), and Documentation (3/5).)
PC Gaming World	8/10
Houston Chronicle	A
Complete Sourcebook on Children's Interactive Media	4.5/5
SuperKids	3.2/5, 4/5, 4.2/5 (Note: No overall score was given. Subscores include Educational Value (3.2/5), Kid Appeal (4/5), and Ease of Use (4.2/5).)

Writing for the Houston Chronicle in November 1998, Anne Reeks called Barbie Riding Club a "holiday must-have" for young girls. She praised the graphics in first-person riding mode, calling the scenery "gorgeous" and giving the game an "A" grade. In 2002, The Complete Sourcebook on Children's Interactive Media rated Barbie Riding Club a 4.5 out of 5 stars, calling it "the best horseback riding simulation available to children" at the time. The writers tested the game with children of different ages and found that children ages 3–8 liked it and "played it repeatedly", with younger testers specifically enjoying the horseback riding and racing. Older reviewers (ages 10 and up) for SuperKids still enjoyed the game but felt like they completed all of the content too quickly.

In the Los Angeles Times, Aaron Curtiss wrote that little girls would enjoy the gameplay in Barbie Riding Club, but he called the game's surprises "anticlimactic". Other reviewers also acknowledged the game's value for younger audiences but were critical of the graphics quality. In her review for All Game Guide, Crystal R. Chweh criticized the game's "disappointing" graphics during the first-person horseback-riding game mode, saying it looked like a "bit-mapped haze". Still, she praised the game's puzzles and horseback-riding simulation, concluding: "Girls who love horses, but don't have ready access to a real one, will have fun with this game". Ian Marsh echoed this sentiment in his review for PC Gaming World, writing that Barbie Riding Club was "a dream" that his own five-year-old daughter was able to play on her own, but he thought the graphics were "blocky". He said that the game is "great fun for horse-mad Barbie fans" but is "far from educational". Erica C. Barnett noted in The Austin Chronicle that there was still an educational value to the game, because it was helpful for teaching young players how to use mouse and keyboard controls on the computer.

Barbie Riding Club was a finalist for "PC Children's Entertainment Title of the Year" at the 2nd Annual Interactive Achievement Awards in 1999. The award is given annually by the Academy of Interactive Arts & Sciences.

=== Retrospective assessment ===
Over 20 years after its initial release, Caroline Madden shared her personal reflections about the game for The Daily Beast, calling the gameplay "sweet, but hypnotic". Madden also described how, when she was a little girl, she would "get lost" caring for her horse or riding along the trails in Secret Valley. The staff at The Washington Post wrote that Barbie Riding Club "raised a generation of horse girls" and proved that girls wanted to play computer games, too.

== See also ==
- List of Barbie video games
