= BarbieGirls.com =

Online virtual world

- Founded: April 24, 2007
- Dissolved: June 1, 2011

BarbieGirls.com was an online virtual world created by Mattel, based on the Barbie brand. It opened on April 24, 2007, and eventually closed on June 1, 2011. International versions of the site closed on April 30, 2011. Mattel also released a line of MP3 players that looked like avatars from the website, these devices came with a free VIP membership for the site.

== History ==
BarbieGirls.com opened on April 24, 2007. After two months, 3 million users had signed up. Mattel proclaimed the site to be "the fastest growing virtual world in history." The site was called "BarbieGirls BETA" until it eventually came out of beta. Because BarbieGirls was aimed primarily at young girls, players were only allowed to play with a female avatar.

The site had a huge community, with many active fansites dedicated to sharing info on the game.

BarbieGirls.com eventually shut down on June 1, 2011. Players were given notice in advance, and VIP memberships were refunded. The official reason Mattel gave for the closure of the site was, "BarbieGirls.com is closing as the Barbie brand is exploring new opportunities where girls can experience the best of Barbie. We are committed to providing girls with the best play experience both on and offline." The homepage encouraged users to join Stardoll, promising to give them free BarbieGirls-inspired items for their avatar in the game. Three popular BarbieGirls games were uploaded to Barbie.com so they could be played after the closure. A folder containing images and wallpapers from BarbieGirls.com was also made available for download.

Fans were upset with the closure. They created petitions to re-open the site, but none of them caught Mattel's attention. No plans have been made to re-open the site. The original URL for BarbieGirls redirects the user to Barbie.com.

== MP3 players ==
A line of customisable BarbieGirls MP3 players was released in 2007. They were designed to look like avatars from the game, with plastic clothes that could be interchanged. Extra fashion packs were available to get more outfits for the device. The player supported MP3 and WMA files that weren't protected by DRM. The device had 512MB of memory, with an SD card slot to expand the storage space. A special 1GB version was also released.

A disc was included with every device that allowed it to be registered with an account on BarbieGirls.com, to give the user a free VIP membership. A user with a BarbieGirls MP3 player was also allowed to become Best Friends with another user.

== Gameplay ==
Each player had their own avatar, for which they could purchase clothes and accessories using B Bucks, the in-game currency. Players also each had their own room, which they could purchase "furni" for with their B Bucks. The game was free-to-play, but members could purchase a VIP membership, which provided access to more locations, mini-games, and items. Members could not purchase items unless they had a VIP membership. Secret codes also existed for players to type in to unlock rare items. Members were allowed to add friends and send pre-made messages to each other.

A chat system called "B Chat" existed for avatars in the same room to communicate with each other. B Chat only allowed players to select from a list of phrases to send. To be able to type in whatever they wanted, an email had to be sent to the parent or guardian for them to select whether they wanted their child to unlock "Super B Chat" or not. Two members who both owned BarbieGirls MP3 players were allowed to become "best friends" and participate in a "Secret B Chat" with each other.

The mini-games on BarbieGirls.com were originally taken from other Mattel websites for My Scene and Pixel Chix, but eventually, original games were featured. The in-game cinema paid players 20 B Bucks to watch a trailer for one of the many Direct-to-DVD Barbie films. After the closure of BarbieGirls.com, some URLs were found that still allowed users to play a selection of the games from the site, but they no longer work. A few of the games from BarbieGirls were also put on the Barbie website, but they have been taken down, like the games from the site that were posted on the Mattel website.

In order to purchase a VIP membership, an account had to be part of the BarbieGirls Parent's Place, which allowed parents to control their child's account and provide online safety tips.

When a player logged in, their avatar was sent to "B Central," which provided the user with buttons that teleported them to various areas in the virtual world. If the player clicked on the giant blimp in B Central, they would be taken to a page titled "Buzz & Goss," which contained all of the latest news about BarbieGirls.
