= Barbie: Pet Rescue =

2001 video game

- Game Boy Color version cover
- Developer: HotGen
- Producers: Mattel Interactive, Vivendi Universal Games
- Platforms: Game Boy Color, Microsoft Windows
- Release: GBC January 2001; PC 15 August 2001
- Genre: Action
- Mode: Single-player

Barbie: Pet Rescue (released in the United Kingdom as Barbie: Pet Patrol) is a 2001 video game for the Game Boy Color and Microsoft Windows, developed by HotGen Studios and published by Mattel Interactive in the United States and Vivendi Universal Games in Europe. It is a Barbie-licensed video game in which players assist animals as a veterinarian.

== Gameplay ==
Gameplay screenshot

The objective of Pet Rescue is to assist Barbie and her sister Stacie to rescue and deliver animals in the neighborhood to the Pet Rescue Center. At the Center, players answer calls to drive a vehicle, including a boat, jeep, truck, or scooter, to an animal in need of rescue,, including a pig, cat, turtle, koala, fox, bunny, bear, deer, lion, or pony, dog, owl and penguin. Players complete one of three minigames to maintain the happiness and health of the animal: in 'Critter Keep Away', players play catch with a kitten; in 'Snacktime Challenge', players must match the favorite foods of the animal in a memory game; and in 'Rascal Run-Around', players must complete a maze game. Some animals, including penguins, dogs, and owls have special minigames to rescue them. Once the animal recovers fully, the player receives a certificate; the game is complete once all fourteen certificates are received for each animal.

== Reception ==
Reception

Review scores
Publication	Score	
Publication	GBC	PC
AllGame	3/5	3/5
Nintendojo	4/10	
Total Advance	72%	

Despite finding the game "rather fun", Total Advance considered the game's concept "so simple it's stupid", critiquing the game's limited number of animals the player can look after, its "rubbish" password save system, and that players could complete it in less than an hour. Nintendojo found the game boring, lacking secrets or surprises, and the audio inappropriate for the gameplay although found the environments "nice looking".

== 2000 version ==
- A separate 2000 Windows release was developed by Human Code and published by Mattel Interactive.
