= Danny Ray (saxophonist) =

American tenor saxophonist

Danny Ray (born Dan Feinstein; February 1, 1951 in New York, United States) is an American tenor saxophonist. Known for his sax style which evolved from early punk rock and R&B roots he is a long-time contributing artist to the New York City music scene and has been identified with the moniker, "Exploding Sax".

Ray is currently performing, touring and recording with New York singer, songwriter Jesse Malin (D Generation), in the Jesse Malin Band. He plays as a member of the perennial Mad Juana, with rock bassist Sami Yaffa (Hanoi Rocks, Jetboy, Demolition 23, New York Dolls) is a member of the Emily Duff Band and can often be seen sitting in with such prolific performers as street poet Puma Perl, and NYC singer-songwriter Diane Gentile.

== Performance history ==
A list of artists Danny Ray has performed with from 1975 to the present:

Sylvain Sylvain, Jerry Nolan and the Ugly Americans, Johnny Thunders, The Waldos, Walter Lure, Rob Stoner, Tony Garnier, Chris Spedding, Lydia Lunch, Anton Fig, Howie Wyeth, Lenny Kaye, Anton Fier, Mike Ness, Alejandro Escovedo, Richard Bacchus, Robert Gordon, Lydia Lunch, The Dickies, Brian Setzer (with The Tomcats), Wayne Kramer, Catherine Popper, Kelley Swindall, New York Dolls, The Persuasions, D Generation, Jesse Malin, Richard Bacchus and the Luckiest Girls, Captain Sensible, The Dickies, Bo Diddley, Roy Buchanan, Earl Scruggs, Bobby Steele, Burny White, Wild Bill Thompson, Steve Conte, Edward "Little Buster" Forehand, Kenny Margolis, River City Rebels, Seamonster, Andy Rosen, Spacehog, Six Gun Republic, Peter Missing (Missing Foundation), The Loveless, Philippe Marcade, The Backbones, The Senders, Holis Brown, The Drossells, The Sheiks, The Emily Duff Band, Puma Perl, The Carvels NYC, Panzie

Off-Broadway production of Silver Manhattan

Cast member in the off-Broadway show production runs of “Silver Manhattan” at the Gramercy Theater (NYC Sept 2025-Jan 2026) and at The Bowery Palace (Feb 2026-May 2026)

== Discography ==
The Sheiks

- "Here Comes The Night" (1978)

The Senders

- "The Living End b/w No More Foolin'Me" (1978) S.R.I. Records
- "Retour A l'Envoyeur" (1983) Skydog Records
- "Back To Sender (Revisited)" (1996) Skydog Records
- "Goodbye Cruel World" (1999) Action Records
- "Lost Hits" (1986) Skydog Records
- "Outrageous and Contagious" (2010) Devils Jukebox Records

The Backbones

- "The Backbones" (1986) Midnight Records
- "Static Soul" (1986) Midnight Records
- "Hanging Out at Midnight" (1984) Midnight Records
- "Midnight X-Mess Part 3" (1987) Midnight Records

The Waldos

- "The Waldos" (1994) Sympathy for the Record Industry

D Generation

- "D Generation" (1994) EMI, Chrysalis Records

Seamonster

- "Seamonster" (1986)
- 'Here Come the Moon"

Devil Dogs

- Title unknown (circa 1989)

Raunch Hands

- Title unknown (circa 1989)

The Drossells

- "Wild Knocked Out Crazy" (2003) Den Records
- "Gotham Garage" (2003) Enoch Records

Six Gun Republic

- "6 Gun Republic" (2001) United Snakes

River City Rebels

- "Hate To Be Loved" (2004) Victory Records

Mad Juana

- "Bruja on the Corner" (2008) Acetate Records
- "Acoustic Voodoo" (2007) Azra Records
- Fuzztones (Tribute Album) (2005) - "Illegitimate Spawn" with Mad Juana
- Kumpania (2012) Backstage Alliance Records

Richard Bacchus and the Luckiest Girls

- "Jet Black & Beautiful" (2007) Stay Gold Records

Matty B and The Dirty Pickles (2008)

- "Picklebilly"

Steve Conte and the Crazy Truth

- "Steve Conte and The Crazy Truth" (2010) Varese Vintage Records

Stihleto (2013)

The Bleeding Hearts

- "Divorcing New York" (2014 Slaphappy Records)

The Nuclears

- "The Is How We Party" (Jan 14,2014 - The Nuclears)

Jesse Malin

- "New York Before the War" (2015 One Little Indian Records)
- "Turn Up The Mains”-single (2015 One Little Indian Records
- "You Know It’s Dark When Atheists Start To Pray"-single (2015 One Little Indian Records
- "She Don’t Love Me Now”-single (2015 One Little Indian Records
- "Outsiders" (2016 One Little Indian Records)

The Waldos

- "Walter Lure & The Waldos - Wacka Lacka Boom Bop A Loom Bam Boo" (Aug 2018 Cleopatra Records)

Emily Duff Band

- "Mr. Dollar & A Dime" (2018)

Electrajets

- "Transatlantic Tales" (Sept 7, 2019 Tarbeach Music)

The Carvels NYC

- "Late Night Heart" (Feb 14,2020 7inch Vinyl Die Laughing Records, LLC

Jesse Malin

- "Todd Youth" (Aug 2020 Wicked Cool Records)
- "Sally Can’t Dance"-single (2020 Wicked Cool Records

Kelley Swindall

- "You Can Call Me Darlin' If You Want" (Sept 18, 2020 Velvet Elk Records)

Richard Bacchus and the Luckiest Girls

- "Viva La Wattage" (June 14, 2021 Sioux Records – SUX-002)

Marc O

- "L'homme de l'ombre" (June 2021 Plastic Sound Records – PSR-011)

Jesse Malin/Eugene Hutz

- "If I Should Fall From the Grace of God" (April 29, 2022 Velvet Elk Records)

The Tube

- "Long Live The Tube" (June 22, 2022 Forty Weight Records)

Diane Gentile and the Gentle Men

- "The Bad and the Beautiful" (Sept 15, 2023 Velvet Elk Records)

Lost Apollo

- "It Won’t Be Like This Forever" (Sept 2023)

Anthony Martinelli

- "Escapade" (2024 WIC Records)

Jesse Malin

- "Chasing the Light" album (June 2024 Wicked Cool Records)

Jesse Malin

- "Chasing the Light" Blue Ray movie (June 2024 Wicked Cool Records)

Emily Duff Band

- "The Obvious Invisible" album (2024 Emily Duff /Mr. Mudshow Music)
