= Barbie Fashion Pack Games =

2000 video game

- Developer: Pulsar Interactive
- Producer: Mattel Interactive
- Platform: Game Boy Color
- Release: September 2000
- Genre: Puzzle
- Mode: Single-player

Barbie Fashion Pack Games is a 2000 fashion video game developed by Pulsar Interactive and published by Mattel Interactive. It is a Barbie-licensed video game in which players complete puzzles to obtain items to dress Barbie and her friends. The game received mixed reviews upon release.

== Gameplay ==
Gameplay screenshot

Fashion Pack Games is a collection of eight puzzle games; completion of each game earns players jewelry, clothing items and accessories that they can use to dress Barbie and her friends in the Fashion Room. In Perfume Factory, players must connect pipes to align drops of perfume into a perfume bottle. In Skirt Unscrambler, players manipulate pieces of a picture to form a complete image. Once all seven games are completed, an eighth game, Hanger Hide-Away, is unlocked, where players must match hangers of the same color. The game has a password save feature to store progress.

== Reception ==
Reception

Review scores
Publication	Score
AllGame	2.5/5
Nintendo Power	4.7/10
Game Boy Power	65%

Describing the title as not bad and "more of a toy than a game", Game Boy Power, found Barbie Fashion Pack Games colorful, but lamented the lack of winning or losing, rewards for completing puzzles or different environments for showing off Barbie's clothes. Nintendo Power found the games simplistic and fun, but considered the title was "so stereotypically girly that it's insulting", suggesting the game would only appeal to younger girls. Allgame remarked that most puzzles were identical.
