= Runecraft (company) =

British video game developer

Gamezlab Limited
- Formerly: Runecraft Limited (1997–2002)
- Industry: Video games
- Founded: April 1997
- Defunct: September 2004
- Successor: Gamezlab
- Headquarters: Yorkshire, England
- Number of employees: 200 (2001)
- Parent: BBC Multimedia (2002-2004)
- Website: runecraft.co.uk (archived)

Gamezlab (formerly Runecraft) was a British video game developer based in Yorkshire. The company was founded in April 1997 and mostly developed games based on licensed properties.

== History ==
In 2002, the company was commissioned by the BBC to develop a fighting game engine for the company's upcoming FightBox game show project. However, various financial issues, mismanagement, and other problems caused Runecraft to go bust at the end of December 2002. To keep the show alive, BBC Worldwide acquired the developer and a small number of its staff, and renamed the developer under BBC's core-publishing brand "Gamezlab".

Following the failure of FightBox and the completion of the tie-in games, In February 2004, Gamezlab were commissioned to develop a video game based on BBC's Spooks TV series for the PlayStation 2, Xbox and Microsoft Windows. The game was planned to use a new internal game engine, but at the end of September 2004, BBC Multimedia closed down Gamezlab as part of a restructuring to focus on licensing and ceasing development and publication.

== Games developed ==
Year	Game	Platform(s)
1998	Risk	PlayStation
1998	Caesars' Palace II	Game Boy Color, PlayStation
1999	Barbie: Race & Ride	PlayStation
1999	Y2K: The Game	Windows
1999	Barbie Super Sports	Windows, PlayStation
2000	Spec Ops: Stealth Patrol	PlayStation
2000	Arthur! Ready to Race	PlayStation
2000	Caesars Palace 2000	Dreamcast, Windows, PlayStation
2000	Evo's Space Adventures	PlayStation
2000	Spec Ops II: Omega Squad	Dreamcast
2000	Detective Barbie: The Mystery Cruise	PlayStation
2001	Barbie: Explorer	PlayStation
2001	Spec Ops: Covert Assault	PlayStation
2001	Soldier of Fortune	Dreamcast
2001	Mat Hoffman's Pro BMX	Dreamcast
2001	Tintin: Destination Adventure	Windows, PlayStation
2001	Rescue Heroes: Molten Menace	PlayStation
2001	Men in Black: The Series – Crashdown	PlayStation
2001	Pajama Sam 3: You Are What You Eat from Your Head to Your Feet	PlayStation
2001	Backyard Soccer	PlayStation
2001	Scrabble	Game Boy Advance, Game Boy Color, PlayStation
2002	Jim Henson's The Hoobs	PlayStation
2002	Westlife: Fan-o-Mania	Windows, PlayStation
2002	Butt Ugly Martians: B.K.M. Battles	Game Boy Advance
2002	Monopoly Party	GameCube, PlayStation 2, Xbox
2002	Shadow of Memories	Windows
2002	Super Bubble Pop	Game Boy Advance, GameCube, PlayStation, Xbox
2002	Butt-Ugly Martians: Zoom or Doom	GameCube, PlayStation 2
2004	FightBox	Game Boy Advance, Microsoft Windows, PlayStation 2
Cancelled	Spooks	Microsoft Windows, PlayStation 2, Xbox
Cancelled	Barbie Treasures in Time	PlayStation 2, GameCube
Cancelled	Thomas the Tank Engine and Friends	PlayStation
Cancelled	Star Trek: New Worlds	Dreamcast
