= Barbie Fashion Designer =

1996 video game

- Mac OS cover for the game
- Developer: Digital Domain
- Publisher: Mattel Media
- Platforms: Microsoft Windows; Mac OS
- Release: November 1996
- Genre: Virtual dress-up game

Barbie Fashion Designer is a 1996 video game developed by Digital Domain and published by Mattel Media for Microsoft Windows and Macintosh. It is a Barbie-licensed game in which players can create, print and decorate dolls with designs made using the software. Designer and inventor Andy Rifkin pitched the game to Mattel after he observed his daughter, Elizabeth Joi, decorating her Barbie dolls with spare fabric, stationery and suggesting to use the computer printer to print patterns. The game was one of the first to be released under a newly-created interactive division named Mattel Media. It is the first example of a successful virtual dress-up game.

Upon release, Barbie Fashion Designer was a commercial success. Released prior to the Christmas season, the software sold over one million copies within a year. Contemporary and retrospective coverage has described the game as a successful example of girls' video games. Later reception has characterized it as the most successful girls' game of its era, and recognized its influence in leading developers to develop and market software targeted at this demographic. The game has been described as representative of a trend of "pink" girls' games, concerned with fashion and appearance. Its design has received commentary and criticism for reinforcing gender stereotypes.

Mattel capitalized on the commercial performance of the game by developing additional Barbie software titles. Digital Domain developed a sequel, Barbie Cool Looks Fashion Designer, which was released in 1998. In 2023, Barbie Fashion Designer was inducted into the World Video Game Hall of Fame at the Strong National Museum of Play.

== Gameplay ==

Players apply designs and colors onto outfits by selecting patterns in the Fabric Design and Color workshop.

The software enables users to create virtual outfits for Barbie to wear or print outfits for a Barbie doll. First, players select the outfit style by drag and dropping desired themes and clothes using the computer mouse. Players can access themed outfits, such as career, vacation or wedding-themed outfits, from the "Theme Workshop", or they can combine elements in the "Mix and Match Workshop". Outfits can be accessorized with additional elements, such as shoes, purses, and belts, and players can change the neckline of some outfits. In the Fabric Design and Color workshops, players can select from one of eight fabric types in range of patterns to style the selected outfits. Once the design has been created, players can preview them in the Dressing Room to see a 3D animation of Barbie virtually model the outfits at a fashion show. Players can print these designs in the Print Workshop using a computer printer, either on paper or with paper-lined fabric packaged with the game. Once printed, players assemble the outfits using seam stickers and hook and loop tape. Printed outfits can be colored in with markers, painted or decorated with materials also included with the game, including shoes, velcro, ribbons, glitter paint and sequins.

== Development and release ==
=== Development ===
The concept for Barbie Fashion Designer was developed and pitched by designer and inventor Andy Rifkin. The original idea for the game was conceived by Andy in 1992 when he saw his daughter, Elizabeth Joi, using markers, paper and staplers to design clothes for her Barbie dolls. Elizabeth Joy had asked her grandmother to save extra fabric for dresses from a boutique to make clothes and asked her father to use the computer printer to create patterns on the material. After pitching the concept to Mattel and engaging in several years of discussion, Andy was hired as vice president of a new interactive division of Mattel, Mattel Media, to lead design and development of the game alongside executive producer Nancie S. Martin.

Mattel enlisted visual effects studio Digital Domain, who were currently working on Titanic and had created a new media department. Digital Domain accepted a deal in which Mattel would retain intellectual property and pass production costs onto them. Digital Domain co-founder Scott Ross stated that he approved the studio's involvement due to the market potential of extending girls' experience with the toys, and the ability to make a profit selling the paper packaged with the game. Development was overseen by Digital Domain vice president Steve Schklair and executive producer Andrea Miloro, with Valerie Grant acting as design and creative director for the game. Mattel president Jill Barad stated the game was an opportunity to expand into an untapped market by creating software "as intriguing to [girls] as it has been for boys".

Development took place over one year. The development process was intensive, with staff recounting they experienced crunch to meet the technical challenges of creating a large number of assets and producing a printer-compatible material at scale. Grant developed the 2D visual assets inspired by earlier experience designing fashion illustration during an art school project. For 3D animations and assets, Digital Domain hired a team of four programmers, led by Patrick Dalton, to handle the challenge of creating a rendering engine that could transform a large database of thousands of clothing assets. Animators used several techniques to model Barbie's outfits, including the use of reference footage to reflect movement of fabric in a realistic way and motion capture from a runway model to render her fashion show animations.

Development of printable patterns on fabric also was a challenge. Producer Jesyca Durchin discovered the effectiveness of fire retardant fabric to create the material, and, after testing a prototype of the fabric with adhesive company Avery Dennison, Mattel manufactured the product itself. Voice actress Chris Anthony was enlisted to provide the voice of Barbie.

=== Release ===
Retailers experienced initial confusion over where to display units of Barbie Fashion Designer, with Mattel preferring the game was sold in the toy aisle alongside other Barbie products. Mattel also spent an estimated $2 million to advertise a television commercial to market the game to parents and children, featuring an early appearance by Mila Kunis and the tagline "computers are cool for girls". Reidel Software Productions published a port of the game for Macintosh.

== Reception ==
=== Sales ===
Barbie Fashion Designer was described as a commercial success. The game received a large number of pre-release orders from retailers, and became of the most in-demand toy and software products of the Christmas season. According to PC Data, it held the fifth position for PC game sales in December 1996, was the sixth-highest selling PC game of 1996, and the thirteenth-highest selling software CD-ROM in the same period, selling an estimated 351,945 copies and bringing in revenue of $14 million. Other sources estimated over 500,000 sales in 1996 and over one million units by the end of 1997.

=== Critical reception ===
Reception

Review scores
Publication	Score
AllGame	3.5/5
MacHome Journal	5/5

Critics praised the hybrid design of the game as a creative tool, with MacHome Journal considering it could help open up a "new dimension of artistry" for girls and PC Open writing that it was a "great example of hands-on play" that could provide users with "the satisfaction of having made something with your own hands". PC Game Parade praised Barbie Fashion Designer for its ease of use, highlighting its voice-over to guide younger users. Some critics found that assembly of printed outfits was more difficult and may require adult supervision. In a satirical review, PC Accelerator considered that, other than designing the dresses, there was little to do. Some critics felt that the range of patterns available was limited. Allgame enjoyed the game but faulted its reliance on fabric and decorating material, stating that "players will run out of [supplies] long before they run out of ideas". Reviewers also noted it could take several minutes for 3D animations to render completed outfits.

=== Retrospective reception ===
The commercial success of Barbie Fashion Designer prompted media coverage about the rise in software for girls, and publishers aimed to recreate its success. The game has been retrospectively praised as one of the first commercially successful games for girls, and a milestone for their inclusion in video games. Mary Kenney of Harper's Bazaar said that some women identified the title as their first experience with a personal computer: "by playing with Barbie, they became comfortable with save files, keyboards and inkjet printers".

The game has been credited with helping to establish the games for girls movement, a marketing trend of software targeted at girls from the 1990s. It has been described as part of a subcategory of "pink" girls' games, named due to its packaging. Patricia Hernandez of Kotaku described Barbie Fashion Designer and other "pink" games as "dependent on traditional values of femininity [such as] addressing concerns about appearance". These have been criticized for reinforcing gender stereotypes, with Brenda Lauren of girls' games developer Purple Moon stating they "perpetuated a version of femininity that was fundamentally lame".

Several authors have examined which elements of Barbie Fashion Designer made it commercially successful, with Dickey noting that most other initial girls' games failed to capture the same success. Kaveri Subrahmanyam and Patricia Greenfield argued that the game succeeded because it promoted activities that personally appealed to young girls, including dress-up, as an "accessory in girls' pretend play". Ann Stephens of PC Data stated the game did well because it's a "good product that incorporates girl play and a strong franchise". Other commentators considered sales were driven by recognition of Barbie as a licensed character, with Elizabeth Sweedyk and Marianne de Laet writing that the game's popularity "reflects girls' interest in Barbie, not their interest in computer play".

Some critics discussed whether Barbie Fashion Designer was a video game, with Popular Science arguing that it "cleverly blurs the line between software and toy" and others proposing that it could be better described as a form of interactive entertainment. Mary Kenney argued that the game is "as much of a video game as Doom" and wrote that its gameplay styles and player goals are no more or less "morally or mechanically superior" to its counterparts.

=== Legacy ===
The success of Barbie Fashion Designer prompted Mattel to expand its interactive media franchise. A sequel, Barbie Cool Looks Fashion Designer, also developed by Digital Domain, was released in March 1998. Mattel also published other Barbie licensed software in that year, including Barbie Magic Hair Styler and Adventures with Barbie: Ocean Discovery, and expanded its experimentation with physical and software integration with Barbie: Party Print 'n Play, which allowed players to create printed stationery, and Talk With Me Barbie, in which players programmed Barbie dolls to talk.

In late 1996, Popular Science provided Elizabeth Joy Rifkin, the daughter of the game's designer, with an award for her personal contribution to the product.

In 2023, the game was one of four inducted into the World Video Game Hall of Fame at the Strong National Museum of Play in New York. Describing it as an "impeccably executed" game that provided a template for fashion games to follow, the Museum stated the game was selected as a "key part of a longer history of expanding audiences for video games, proving that girls enjoyed playing electronically as much as boys did".

== See also ==
- List of Barbie video games
