= Barbie: Explorer =

2001 video game

- North American PlayStation box art
- Developer: Runecraft
- Publisher: Vivendi Universal Interactive Publishing
- Series: Barbie
- Platforms: PlayStation, Windows
- Release: PlayStation: NA: 14 September 2001; EU: 2001; Windows: NA: 2002
- Genres: Action-adventure, platform
- Mode: Single-player

Barbie: Explorer is a Microsoft Windows and PlayStation game featuring Barbie. It was developed by Runecraft, published by Vivendi Universal Interactive Publishing and was released in 2001.

== Plot ==
While working as a reporter, Barbie discovers an ancient mirror in a local museum which is missing 4 pieces, and which when completed will have its power unlocked. She decides to find these pieces by setting off on an adventure around the world to find these 4 treasures. These locations include Tibet, Egypt, Africa (all accessible from the start) and the final unlockable area, Babylon. Each of these locations has three levels, concluding with a boss.

The game ends when the four artifacts are found and Barbie goes back to the museum. She places each artifact in its respective spot on the mirror and it is repaired.

== Gameplay ==
The player takes control of Barbie, running, walking and climbing her way through the level. The protagonist has no attack, with the player instead solving puzzles and platforming to get to the level's end. The main hazards in the game are animals (such as camels, elephants, and goats), which do not actively try to attack the player and instead roam around the environment. The gameplay was seen as an attempt to imitate the success of Tomb Raider.

== Reception ==
Reception

Review scores
Publication	Score
GameZone	8/10
Jeuxvideo.com	10/20
PSX Nation	61%

In a review in PSX Nation, J. M. Vargas called the game a "G-rated Tomb Raider clone" without any challenge and an "unbearable" set of controls. They were critical of graphics, especially the animation which they called "atrocious, canned, repetitive and mannequin-like in its awkwardness". Vargas would give the game a 61% overall.

Michael Lafferty, writing for GameZone, was more positive, giving it a score of 8/10. He complemented the game by saying that while the arcade style was predictable, the action is nonstop within levels and it offered "young gamers a Tomb Raider-esque arcade adventure".

== See also ==
- List of Barbie video games
