= Barbie: Game Girl =

1992 video game

- North American cover art
- Developer(s): Imagineering
- Publisher(s): Hi Tech Expressions
- Producer(s): Billy Pidgeon
- Designer(s): Alex DeMeo; Henry C. Will IV
- Programmer(s): Henry C. Will IV; Chris Will; Tak Lau; Mark Beardsley
- Artist(s): Glen Schofield; Mike Sullivan
- Composer(s): Mark Van Hecke
- Series: Barbie
- Platform(s): Game Boy
- Release: NA: October 1992; EU: 1992; AU: 1993
- Genre(s): Platform
- Mode(s): Single-player

Barbie: Game Girl is a 2D platform game released in 1992 for the Game Boy based on the Barbie doll franchise.

== Gameplay ==
Barbie is inside a giant 50s diner trying to avoid a possessed soft drink that is throwing French fries at her.

In this platform game, Barbie must find an outfit for her date with Ken. The environment features a shopping mall level, an underwater level, and other worlds to explore. The game is also centered on collecting gems and pearls to fend off opponents.

Enemies in the game include the usual sharks found in underwater levels, in addition to jellyfish. Moving cubes of sugar must also be defeated in the game. The bonus rounds of the game are essentially a Concentration-type game, where matching identical cards lead to extra points for the player.

== Reception ==
Allgame gave the game a rating of 2.5 out of 5. Power Unlimited gave it a score of 65% in their review, writing: "Barbie Gamegirl is clearly an effort to get more girls to play games. Unfortunately, the people who made it didn't fully understand that girls also just want games that are fun to play. German video game reviewer Aktueller Software Markt gave the game a rating of 3 out of 12. A 3.3 out of five review from Nintendo Power praised the easy gameplay and called the game perfect for fans of Barbie.

== See also ==
- List of Barbie video games
