= Barbie Magic Hair Styler =

1997 video game

- Windows OS cover for the game
- Developer: EAI Interactive
- Publisher: Mattel Media
- Platform: Microsoft Windows
- Release: Oct 01, 1997

Barbie Magic Hair Styler is a dress-up computer game developed by EAI Interactive and published by Mattel Media for Microsoft Windows in 1997.

== Gameplay ==
Players can cut and style Barbie, Kira, Christie, or Teresa's hair, as well as regrow hair with a specific lengthening tool. They can also apply makeup including eyeshadow, lipstick, blush or temporary tattoos. Application of makeup is limited to appropriate areas for makeup and using offbeat colors can trigger a "that looks funny" response from the game.

Players can also add jewelry and thematic accessories. At the end of the styling session players can be treated to a video of the chosen character with the player's results. Accessories meant to go with a certain career are limited to nurse, firefighter, gym coach, or construction worker.

== Reception ==
Reception

Review scores
Publication	Score
AllGame	3.5/5
New York Daily News	2.5/4

In their review, AllGame gave the game 3 and half stars out of a possible 5, complimenting its replay value and the vast combinations of styles and accessories, as well as the "well-designed gameplay". However they were more critical of some of the controls and some of the prescriptivist fashion opinions expressed by Barbie in the game.

== See also ==
- List of Barbie video games
