= Memory game =

Memory game may refer to:-

- Memory Game, a 1971 US game show
- The Memory Game, a psychological thriller by Nicci Gerrard and Sean French
- "The Memory Game" (Rosanne), an episode of the US sitcom Roseanne
- Concentration (card game), a game where pairs of face-down cards must be matched
- Memory sport, competitive memorisation events
- Kim's Game, a game of memorising objects
