= Barbie: Race & Ride =

1999 video game

- Developer: Runecraft
- Publishers: NA: Mattel Media; EU: Sony Computer Entertainment
- Platform: PlayStation
- Release: NA: 19 November 1999; UK: 3 December 1999
- Genre: Sports
- Mode: Single-player

Barbie Race & Ride is a 1999 horse racing video game developed by Runecraft and published by Mattel Media for the PlayStation. Its equestrianism-based gameplay makes it a spiritual predecessor to the Barbie Horse Adventures series.

== Gameplay ==
Players can decide whether to play in 1-player mode or 2-player mode (in 2-player mode, they will not be able to clean and care for their horse). A player will choose one of two outfits for their character and then they'll pick their horse.

Before players can go out on one of the trails, they must go through a riding lesson. Once that's taken care of, they can go to four areas: Beach, Forest, Meadow and Mountain; of which, only the Beach and the Meadow will let them race against other players. There is also a "Secret Ranch," where players find a foal and win the game.

There are only four horses players can choose from all of which are identical apart from in every way except colour. The player then can pick a name from a predetermined list, such as Buttercup, Sweetie.

== Reception ==
Reception

Review scores
Publication	Score
Consoles +	6%
GameSpot	7.9/10
Player One	5%
Daily Radar	1/4
The Review Busters	1/10

The game received generally negative reviews. Carrie Shepherd writing for Daily Radar gave the game a "DUD" rating, the lowest of the 4 ratings available on the site. She said it was hard to imagine how the game could be worse and criticised it for lack of challenge and fun. A review in the French gaming magazine Consoles + gave the game a mere 6% calling it ugly, crude, devoid of interest and an insult to all girls. John Cooper for Game Tour added that the level design was terrible and the abundant mini games were laughably simple.

Janet Valentine reviewing the game for GameSpot UK, on the other hand, was the more positive about the game, giving it a 7.9/10. Valentine says that for its target audience "it delivers the goods in captivating quantity" and complimented it as "one of very few specifically for young girls on the PlayStation".

== See also ==
- List of Barbie video games
