= Barbie: Super Model =

1993 video game

- Developer: Tahoe Software Productions
- Publisher: Hi Tech Expressions
- Composer: Danny Toft (SNES)
- Series: Barbie
- Platforms: Genesis, Super NES, MS-DOS
- Release: 1993
- Genres: Educational, action
- Modes: Single-player, multiplayer

Barbie: Super Model is a one or two-player educational action video game that allows the player to play as Barbie. It was released for the Genesis, Super NES, and MS-DOS in 1993.

== Gameplay ==
The main part of the game comprises very simple arcade-style sequences. In each level, the player must navigate from one end of a horizontally scrolling area to the other, avoiding all of the obstacles and potential hazards coming towards the main character. Players can either do the "normal" difficulty level with everything or the "easy" difficulty level that allows younger children to try the matching games without dealing with the side-view levels.

The levels each have a different theme. The themes include driving Barbie's convertible in Hollywood, roller skating in Hawaii, walking in the snow during a vacation in Vail, and riding her bike in New York City. The arcade-style sequences are interspersed with sections that test the player's memory. At the half-way point of each level the player can practice Barbie's moves for a fashion show. At the end of each level, the player must correctly perform these moves from memory.

By collecting certain objects, the player can unlock bonus rounds. The aim of these rounds is to dress Barbie and choose her makeup and earrings in order to match magazine covers. The two-player option is essentially the same as the one-player option; the players take turns in completing the same levels, and do not interact with one another. The two-player mode is in the game to let the players compare high scores with each other.

== Reception ==
Reception

Review score
Publication	Score
Ação Games	4/16

Barbie: Super Model garnered mixed reviews upon release. In a 2.8-out-of-five review, Nintendo Power described the game as "a sort of Sim Model experience", writing that while fans of Barbie may enjoy the interactivity, other players will most likely not be interested at all. Writer "Miss Chlevous" of GamePro, who scored the game a 2.5 out of five, found the presentation satisfactory but criticized the gameplay for being too slow-paced and primitive, recommending it only to Barbie fans and video game beginners. David Sheff used Super Model as an example of the lack of difficulty common in video games targeted towards girls, while other book authors were critical towards the game for its stereotypical emphasis on sex appeal, fashion and appearance.

== See also ==
- List of Barbie video games
