= Secret Agent Barbie =

2001 video game

- Box art (PC version)
- Developers: Gigawatt Studios (PC); Digital Illusions Canada (GBA)
- Publisher: Vivendi Universal Interactive Publishing
- Series: Barbie
- Platforms: Microsoft Windows; Game Boy Advance
- Release: NA: 2001; September 30, 2002
- Genres: 3D adventure 2D platformer
- Mode: Single-player

Secret Agent Barbie or Barbie: Secret Agent is a multi platform video game released in 2001 for Microsoft Windows and Game Boy Advance. It follows Barbie as a secret agent doing missions all over the world.

== Secret Agent Barbie: Royal Jewels Mission ==
=== Plot ===
Secret Agent Barbie: Royal Jewels Mission is a 2D action platformer released for the GBA. The Queen's Jewels are stolen by the antagonist, Camille. Barbie travels to England, China, Italy, and Mexico collecting secret files while dodging guards to recover the Queen's Jewels and catch the thief.

=== Reception ===
Reception

Aggregate score
| Aggregator | Score |
|---|---|
| Metacritic | (GBA) 71/100 |

Review scores
| Publication | Score |
|---|---|
| GameZone | (PC) 8.5/10 |
| IGN | (GBA) 7.5/10 |

Secret Agent Barbie: Royal Jewels Mission received "mixed or average" reviews, according to review aggregator Metacritic.

IGN called the game "the best Metal Gear knock-off that the GBA has at the moment," and praised its surprising complexity. GameZone praised the animation, color, sound, and background music of the PC version.

== Secret Agent Barbie ==
=== Plot ===
Secret Agent Barbie is a 3D action game released for Microsoft Windows. Barbie and her friends are secret agents and are called to New York by Teresa to help with her fashion show. Someone has stolen the cloth and plans to make an invisibility suit. It is up to Barbie to stop the thief. Barbie travels to Paris, New York, Egypt, Tokyo, and Rio in order to solve the mystery and find the plans.

=== Reception ===
GameZone praised the animation, color, sound, and background music of the PC version.

== See also ==
- List of Barbie video games
