= Detective Barbie 2: The Vacation Mystery =

- Developer: Gorilla Systems Corporation
- Publisher: Mattel Media
- Series: Detective Barbie
- Platform: Windows
- Release: October 1999
- Genre: Adventure

Detective Barbie 2: The Vacation Mystery, also known as Barbie Detective 2: The Vacation Mystery, is a 1999 video game developed by Gorilla Systems Corporation and published by Mattel Media, and functions as the sequel to Detective Barbie in the Mystery of the Carnival Caper (1998). It is for ages 4 and up.

== Gameplay ==
Barbie is called to solve the disappearance of valuable jewels at a beach resort designed by an inventive creator. The player enters or selects a name, which Barbie uses during the adventure, and may optionally import a photo from the Barbie Digital Camera. Investigation involves interviewing characters, storing clues in the in‑game crime computer, and receiving hints from Becky Current page. The player explores the resort, searches for clues with tools such as a magnifying glass, and uncovers hidden areas using a point‑and‑click interface with a cursor that changes based on context. Additional activities include driving a four‑wheeler over dunes, pursuing suspects in a boat chase, and using a hang glider to view the resort from above Current page. The game also features puzzles involving objects like a piano, lighthouse, gazebo, and desk, and allows printing items such as images, a Junior Detective Badge, and postcards.

== Reception ==
Reception

Review scores
Publication	Score
New York Daily News	79%
The Houston Chronicle	B

Both Birmingham Post-Herald and Kids Domain called Detective Barbie 2: The Vacation Mystery fun for boys and girls alike. SuperKids thought the game may be too difficult for young players, and recommended that people with short attention spans should stay away from it. The Canadian Toy Testing Council gave Detective Barbie 2: The Vacation Mystery three stars on a scale of three stars, two stars, one star, novelty, not recommended.
