= Mattel Interactive =

Video game publisher and software distributor

- Formerly: Mattel Media (1996–1999)
- Type: Subsidiary
- Industry: Video games
- Founded: February 12, 1996; 30 years ago
- Defunct: 2001; 25 years ago
- Fate: Split up
- Successor: Ubisoft; Riverdeep Interactive Learning
- Parent: Mattel (1995–2000); Gores Technology Group (2000–2001)
- Divisions: Barbie Software for Girls
- Subsidiaries: The Learning Company; Mindscape; Red Orb Entertainment; Purple Moon

Mattel Interactive (Known as Mattel Media until 1999) was a video game publisher and software distributor.

== History ==
Mattel originally founded the company as Mattel Media in February 1996, as an aim to expand into the multimedia unit by producing CD-ROM titles based on Mattel franchises like Hot Wheels, Barbie, Fisher-Price and Polly Pocket. The company's first releases came out in the Fall of 1996, with the company's Barbie Fashion Designer program was the first commercially successful video game made for girls.

With the success of their first wave of products, Mattel Media then set on producing CD-ROM based interactive material for toys such as the Talk with Me! Barbie.

Mattel Media later expanded to video games soon after, publishing titles like Hot Wheels Stunt Track Driver.

In the fall of 1998, Mattel agreed to acquire The Learning Company in a stock-for-stock merger valuing the company at approximately $4.2 billion. With the merger, Mattel themselves laid off 3,000 employees.

Mattel sold both Mattel Interactive and The Learning Company in 2000 at a loss to Gores Technology Group. The total financial losses to Mattel have been estimated to be as high as $3.6 billion. Mattel's acquisition of The Learning Company has been referred to as "one of the worst acquisitions of all time" by several prominent business journals.

In February 2001, Mattel signed a publishing and distribution deal with THQ for the Hot Wheels and Matchbox licenses, and Vivendi Universal Interactive Publishing for other major licenses including Diva Starz, Fisher-Price and Barbie. That same month, THQ also acquired Mattel's computer rights to Rugrats, SpongeBob SquarePants and Rocket Power and Mattel's console and computer rights to The Wild Thornberrys and Jimmy Neutron: Boy Genius.

In 2000, the ex-Learning Company and Mattel assets acquired by Gores were split up into three divisions - GAME Studios for video games, The Learning Company for educational software and Broderbund for home software. GAME Studios' was sold to Ubi Soft in March 2001, taking all of the gaming assets formerly held by The Learning Company. The Learning Company itself was acquired by Riverdeep Interactive Learning Limited in September 2001 and later acquired all of Broderbund in August 2002.

== Games ==
Title	Platform(s)	Developer(s)	Year(s)
Barbie Fashion Designer	Microsoft Windows	Digital Domain	1996
Barbie Fashion Designer	Mac OS	Digital Domain	1996
Mother Goose's Farm	Microsoft Windows	Albataion Software	1996
Magic Fairy Tales: Barbie as Rapunzel	Microsoft Windows	Media Station	1997
Magic Fairy Tales: Barbie as Rapunzel	Mac OS	Media Station	1997
Clueless CD-ROM	Microsoft Windows	Girl Games	1997
Clueless CD-ROM	Mac OS	Girl Games	1997
Barbie Magic Hair Styler	Microsoft Windows	EAI Interactive	1997
Hot Wheels Stunt Track Driver	Microsoft Windows	Semi Logic Entertainments	1998
Hot Wheels Stunt Track Driver	Game Boy Color	Lucky Chicken Games	2000
Detective Barbie in the Mystery of the Carnival Caper	Microsoft Windows	Gorilla Systems Corporation	1998
My Interactive Pooh	Microsoft Windows	Gorilla Systems Corporation	1998
Barbie Riding Club	Microsoft Windows	Human Code	1998
The Rugrats Mystery Adventures	Microsoft Windows	KnowWare	1999
The Rugrats Mystery Adventures	Mac OS	KnowWare	1999
Magna Doodle	Microsoft Windows	Stunt Puppy Entertainment	1999
Men Are from Mars, Women Are from Venus: The CD-ROM Game	Microsoft Windows	Random Games	1999
Nick Click	Microsoft Windows	Gorilla Systems Corporation	1999
Nickelodeon BrainBender	Microsoft Windows	Human Code	1999
Detective Barbie 2: The Vacation Mystery	Microsoft Windows	Gorilla Systems Corporation	1999
The Adventures of Elmo in Grouchland	Microsoft Windows	Children's Television Workshop	1999
Create and Draw in Elmo's World	Microsoft Windows	Children's Television Workshop	1999
Sesame Street Music Maker	Microsoft Windows	Children's Television Workshop	1999
Barbie Generation Girl: Gotta Groove	Microsoft Windows	Stunt Puppy Entertainment	1999
Barbie as Sleeping Beauty	Microsoft Windows	Gorilla Systems Corporation	1999
Pokémon Project Studio (Note: Europe only, published by then-subsidiary The Learning Company in North America.)	Microsoft Windows	Leisure Concepts	1999
Barbie Race and Ride (Note: Published in Europe by Sony Computer Entertainment.)	PlayStation	Runecraft	1999
Barbie Super Sports (Note: Published in Europe by Sony Computer Entertainment.)	PlayStation	Runecraft	1999
Barbie Super Sports	Microsoft Windows	Runecraft	1999
Uno	Microsoft Windows	HotGen	1999
Uno	Game Boy Color	HotGen	1999
Matchbox Construction Zone	Microsoft Windows	Prolific	1999
Matchbox Construction Zone	Game Boy Color	Realtime Associates	2000
Rat Attack (Note: European distribution, published by then-division Mindscape)	Nintendo 64	Pure Entertainment	2000
PokéROM (Note: Europe only, published by then-subsidiary The Learning Company in North America.)	Microsoft Windows	Basis Applied Technology	2000
Elmo's Deep Sea Adventure	Microsoft Windows	Sesame Workshop	2000
The Wild Thornberrys: Rambler	Microsoft Windows	Human Code	2000
The Wild Thornberrys: Rambler	Game Boy Color	Vicarious Visions	2000
Tyco RC: Assault with a Battery	PlayStation	Lucky Chicken Games	2000
Rugrats: Totally Angelica Bordom Busters	Microsoft Windows	KnowWonder	2000
Rugrats in Paris: The Movie	Microsoft Windows	KnowWonder	2000
Detective Barbie: The Mystery Cruise (Note: Published in Europe by Vivendi Universal Games.)	PlayStation	Runecraft	2000
Arthur! Ready to Race (Note: Co-published with then-division The Learning Company.)	PlayStation	Runecraft	2000
The Wild Thornberrys: Animal Adventures	PlayStation	KnowWonder	2000
Barbie: Magic Genie Adventure	Game Boy Color	Vicarious Visions	2000
Tyco R/C Racin' Ratz	Game Boy Color	KnowWonder	2000
Chessmaster 8000	Microsoft Windows	Mattel Interactive	2000
Sega Rally 2	Microsoft Windows	Sega AM Annex	2000
Championship Surfer (Note: Published by GAME Studios in Europe.)	Microsoft Windows	Krome Studios	2000
Championship Surfer	PlayStation	Krome Studios	2000
Championship Surfer	Dreamcast	Krome Studios	2000
Rock 'Em Sock 'Em Robots Arena	PlayStation	Paradox Development	2000
Max Steel: Covert Missions	Dreamcast	Treyarch	2000
Prince of Persia: Arabian Nights	Dreamcast	Avalanche Software	2000
