= Arthur video games =

Video game franchise

The Arthur video games franchise was a series of learning and interactive story video games based on the American-Canadian children's TV show Arthur. The games were released in the 1990s and 2000s for PlayStation and Game Boy Color alongside Windows and Mac OS computers.

== Creative Wonders games ==
Arthur was a 1990s video game series developed by Creative Wonders and published by The Learning Company. The games were created as part of the LearningBuddies line.

=== Titles ===
- Arthur's Kindergarten has the player learn kindergarten skills while attempting to fix Arthur's treehouse, which has been damaged in a storm. The game covers basic reading, arithmetic memory skills, and social skills.
- Arthur's Preschool (2000)
- Arthur's 1st Grade has the player participate in Bionic Bunny's "Good Deeds Contest" by doing good deeds around the neighbourhood. The game covers reading and math skills.
- Arthur's 2nd Grade has the player participate in "Take Your Kids to Work Day" by completing tasks and chores. The game covers reading, math, grammar, and geography. A new edition was released in 2002.
- Arthur's Reading is a two-disc CD-based game that contains more than 50 activities featuring Arthur characters. Disc 1 covers letter recognition, phonics, and word families, as well as containing an art room for players to print out. Disc 2 covers reading comprehension, grammar, and spelling.
- Arthur's Math Games contains five math-related activities.
- Arthur's Reading Games (1997) contains four reading games and the interactive story Arthur's Reading Race, written by Marc Brown.
- Arthur's Thinking Games (1999) contains six activities related to building critical thinking and logic skills. It was released in 2001 by The Learning Company.

=== Production ===
A Bangor Daily News article hinted that a new series of Arthur video games would be released in fall 1999. In February 1999, The Learning Company announced that it had "signed an exclusive, multi-year contract with Marc Brown to develop and publish interactive software worldwide". The aim was to utilise Arthur's equity by "broadening his visibility in the interactive software category", specifically within the core curriculum areas. The Learning Company announced Arthur's Reading, the first game in the series, in a news release on July 13. The subject was chosen because "reading is a natural subject for this lovable character whose nationally televised adventures have become so popular with young children", according to The Learning Company.

The series was "developed with the help of educators". Most games have an auto-levelling feature to cater to each player's own skill.

A kid-friendly website was also available for players to seek further activities that supplemented the games' content.

=== Spyware concerns ===
The Congressional Record, V. 146, Pt. 15 wrote that a spyware expert found that educational software such as Reader Rabbit and Arthur's Thinking Games may contain spyware. U.S. News & World Report noted that a cause could be the free Arthur screensaver that players of Arthur's Thinking Games have the option to download. The New York Times reported that the Broadcast program, which ran in the background as an application called DSS Agent, used to be included on the installation discs of many software titles made by The Learning Company, including the Arthur video games, while Arthur's Reading Race "was billed as a product updater and communications tool"; online privacy groups put it in the category of spyware for this reason.

=== Commercial performance ===
According to PC Data, Arthur's Thinking Games was the ninth top-selling software of September 1999, and the top-selling home education software for that month.

=== Critical reception ===
PCMag gave Arthur's Preschool, Kindergarten, First Grade, and Second Grade a joint rating of five out of five, writing that the "charming" games covered the same content as the Reader Rabbit series, though also saying that players could easily own both.

SuperKids deemed Arthur's Kindergarten an underwhelming entry in the kindergarten edutainment space, due to having "tedious and overly repetitious" activities. Math and Science for Young Children and Experiences in Math for Young Children suggested that the game could be used within schools. Discovery Education said that Arthur's Kindergarten was "packed with 'smart' features and excellent educational content".

Teaching Reading in Today's Elementary Schools said that Arthur's 1st Grade was not limited to its target market, but that it could also be adapted for children in higher grades who had special needs. MacWorld said that while Arthur's 1st Grade could be initially overwhelming, it was ultimately rewarding.

The Eugene Register-Guard gave Arthur's Reading four out of four, deeming all of the activities "well designed, educational, and fun". The Bangor Daily News said that the game would challenge and engage players of all ages. SuperKids said that the game would leave veteran video gamers "unimpressed" and "disappointed".

MacWorld deemed Arthur's Reading Games an "amusing, interactive product".

In 1999, Forbes wrote a piece questioning if wrapping up educational content under the guise of video games featuring children's characters such as Arthur and Dr. Seuss was enough to "entice parents with the promise of easy learning for their kids".

== Living Books games ==
There were several interactive storybooks in the Living Books series based on Arthur, such as Arthur's Birthday and Arthur's Teacher Trouble. The games were developed by Living Books and published by Brøderbund Software and Random House.

=== Titles ===
- Arthur's Teacher Trouble (1993)
- Arthur's Birthday (1994)
- Arthur's Reading Race (1997)
- Arthur's Computer Adventure (1998)
- D.W., the Picky Eater (1998)

=== Critical reception ===
Aktueller Software Markt praised two entries in the series and concluded the review by begging for a German version of the games. World Village thought Arthur's Reading Race was "very well written", while All Game gave it 4.5 stars out of 5.

Just Adventure gave Arthur's Computer Adventure a top rating of A. All Game gave it 4/5 stars, while SuperKids wrote that it wasn't the strongest entry in the Living Books product line. The Daily Gazette warned that Arthur's Computer Adventure wouldn't hold kids' attention for long.

== Other games ==
- Arthur! Ready to Race (2000): A racing game developed by Runecraft and published by The Learning Company/Mattel Interactive. Released on December 12, 2000 for PlayStation, this game has Arthur search for parts to build a cardboard box racer. It consists primarily of minigames in which the player partakes to gain parts, although the player is confined to exploring a small area in Elwood City. The graphics are in 3D, with three pre-rendered CGI cutscenes. The voice acting in the game is not done by the voice actors from the television show.
- Arthur's Absolutely Fun Day: Mattel Interactive/The Learning Company/Ed Magnin and Associates (GBC): Released in September 2000, this game has the player control Arthur through part of Elwood City and partake in minigames so that he can visit an amusement park.
- Arthur's Camping Adventure (2000): A point-and-click adventure game co-published by The Learning Company/Mattel Interactive. Superkids deemed it "interesting and fun". The game was also known as Arthur's Wilderness Rescue.
- Arthur's Pet Chase (2003): A side-scrolling platform game developed by ImaginEngine Corp and published by The Learning Company.
- Arthur's Sand Castle Contest (2003): An arcade game developed by ImaginEngine Corp and published by Riverdeep Interactive Learning Limited.
