= Bill Wise =

American voice actor (1964–2026)

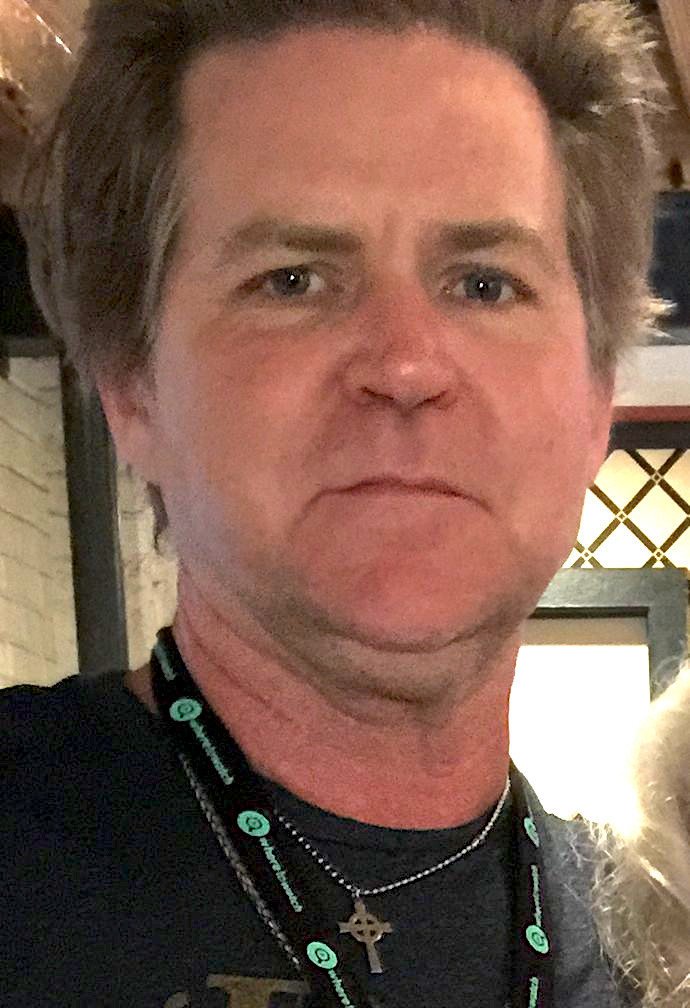
- Wise in 2015
- Born: William A. Wise; July 9, 1964; Manchester Township, Cumberland County, North Carolina, U.S.
- Died: April 25, 2026 (aged 61); Austin, Texas, U.S.
- Other name: William Wise
- Occupations: Actor; voice actor; producer; writer; musician
- Years active: 1989–2026
- Agent: Collier Talent Agency
- Height: 190 cm (6 ft 3 in)
- Spouse: Mandy Melick (m. 1998; div. 2005)
- Children: 2

William A. Wise (July 9, 1964 – April 25, 2026) was an American voice and film actor, best known for his roles in anime dubs, as well as in films by Richard Linklater and Trey Edward Shults.

As a writer, in 2013 Wise won Best Writing award at New York Television Festival for his work in the film Disenchanted.

== Death ==
Wise died in Austin, Texas on April 25, 2026, at the age of 61. His death was announced publicly one week later, on May 2.

== Filmography ==
=== Film ===
Year	Title	Role	Notes
1994	Texas Chainsaw Massacre: The Next Generation	Heckler	
1995	Legend of Crystania: The Motion Picture	Garudi	
1996	Cadillac Ranch	Hippie Artist	
1996	SubUrbia	George the Limo Driver	
1997	Rurouni Kenshin: Requiem for the Ishin Patriots	Tomono	
1999	Natural Selection	Ferrel Dickenson	
1999	American Detective	Ed	
2000	What I Like About You	Skippy	
2001	Waking Life	Boat Car Guy	
2001	The Duo	Best Man	
2003	Screen Door Jesus	Luther	
2006	Rune	Professor Cato	
2007	Everything or Nothing	Ray	
2008	RSO: Registered Sex Offender	Arnold	
2008	Six Gun	Will	
2009	The 2 Bobs	Transvestite #1	
2009	Harmony and Me	Meter Maid Subordinate	
2009	God Thinks You're a Loser	Peter	
2009	Between Floors	Crowd	
2010	Ultimate Guide to Flight	Guerrero	
2010	Mojo Tango	Donny	
2011	Austin High	Chet	
2011	Days of Delusion	Coach Sheedy	
2012	Somebody Up There Likes Me	Caterer #1	
2012	Butcher Boys	Cop #2	
2013	Computer Chess	Roger	
2014	Boyhood	Uncle Steve	
2014	New Initial D the Movie	Bunta	Voice
2014	You Are Your Body/You Are Not Your Body	Preacher Bill	
2015	Results	Officer Smart	
2015	Krisha	Doyle	
2015	Lazer Team	Football Announcer #1	
2016	Tiramisu for Two	Mr. Romano	
2016	The Golden Rut	Moses Duval	
2017	Sins of the Fathers	Reuben Atkins	
2018	Support the Girls	Grady	
2018	Thunder Road	The Captain	
2018	Incredibles 2	Screenslaver	Voice
2019	Sister Aimee	Billy Sunday	
2019	Frances Ferguson	Parole Officer	
2019	Waves	Coach Wise	
2020	Mr. Weekend	Anchorman	
2020	Sonic Rebuilt	Knuckles the Echidna	Voice
2020	The Get Together	Rick	
2022	Apollo 10 1/2: A Space Age Childhood	Dad	
2024	Sunlight	Wade	
2025	The Long Shot	Dale Stockton	
TBA	Natureland	Jeff	

=== Television ===
Year	Title	Role	Notes
1989	Blood Reign: Curse of the Yoma	Shiratsuyu	Miniseries
1995	Wedding Peach	Jama-P	English version; voice
1996	Sonic the Hedgehog	Knuckles the Echidna	2 episodes
1996, 1998	Walker, Texas Ranger	J.T. Hopkins / Milo Creech	2 episodes
1997	Hope	Deputy Sheriff	Television film
1998	Lost Universe	Rail	English version; voice
1998	Queen Emeraldas	Gamor	Miniseries
1998	Getter Robo Armageddon	Hayato Jin	13 episodes
1999	Devil Lady	Otoya	Episode: "Rope"
1999	Dai-Guard	Ookouchi	Episode: "Umi kara kita saiyaku"
1999	The Soul Collector	Paramedic	Television film
2001	Rurouni Kenshin: Reflection	Enishi Yukishiro	Episode: "After So Many Years Have Passed Part 2"
2002	Jing: King of Bandits	Angostura Sr.	Miniseries
2002–2003	GetBackers	Fudou	8 episodes
2003	Moeyo Ken	English Gentleman / Sakon	Miniseries
2005	Guyver: The Bioboosted Armor	Guyot	2 episodes
2006	Pumpkin Scissors	Wolmarf	Episode: "Invisible Number 9"
2006	Prison Break	Sundown Hotel Guy	Episode: "Rendezvous"
2012	Up to Speed	Dumpster #2	Episode: "Chicago: To Conjure a Lost Neighborhood"
2015	Master Class: The Web Series	Tom 'Tomcat' Perkins	10 episodes
2015	The Leftovers	Emcee	Episode: "Lens"
2016	Crunch Time	Dean Samuelson	3 episodes
2016–2017	Red vs. Blue	Carlos Trabka / Terrill	4 episodes
2017	Transparent	August	3 episodes
2019	iZombie	Martin Roberts	6 episodes
2020	Gary Busey: Pet Judge	Bill	Miniseries

=== Video games ===
Year	Title	Role	Notes
1995	Operation: Weather Disaster	Jonah Rainwater/The Weatherman	
1996	Schoolhouse Rock!: Math Rock	Farmer	
1996	Schoolhouse Rock!: America Rock	Skip Rutledge, Inventor, Minutemen, Red Coats	
1997	Operation: Eco Nightmare	Jonah Greenstreet/The Garbageman	
2011	Serious Sam Double D	General Maxilla	XXL version only
2011	Serious Sam 3: BFE	Rodriguez	
2013	Pirate101	Aldo	
