= Nicki Rapp =

American voice actress

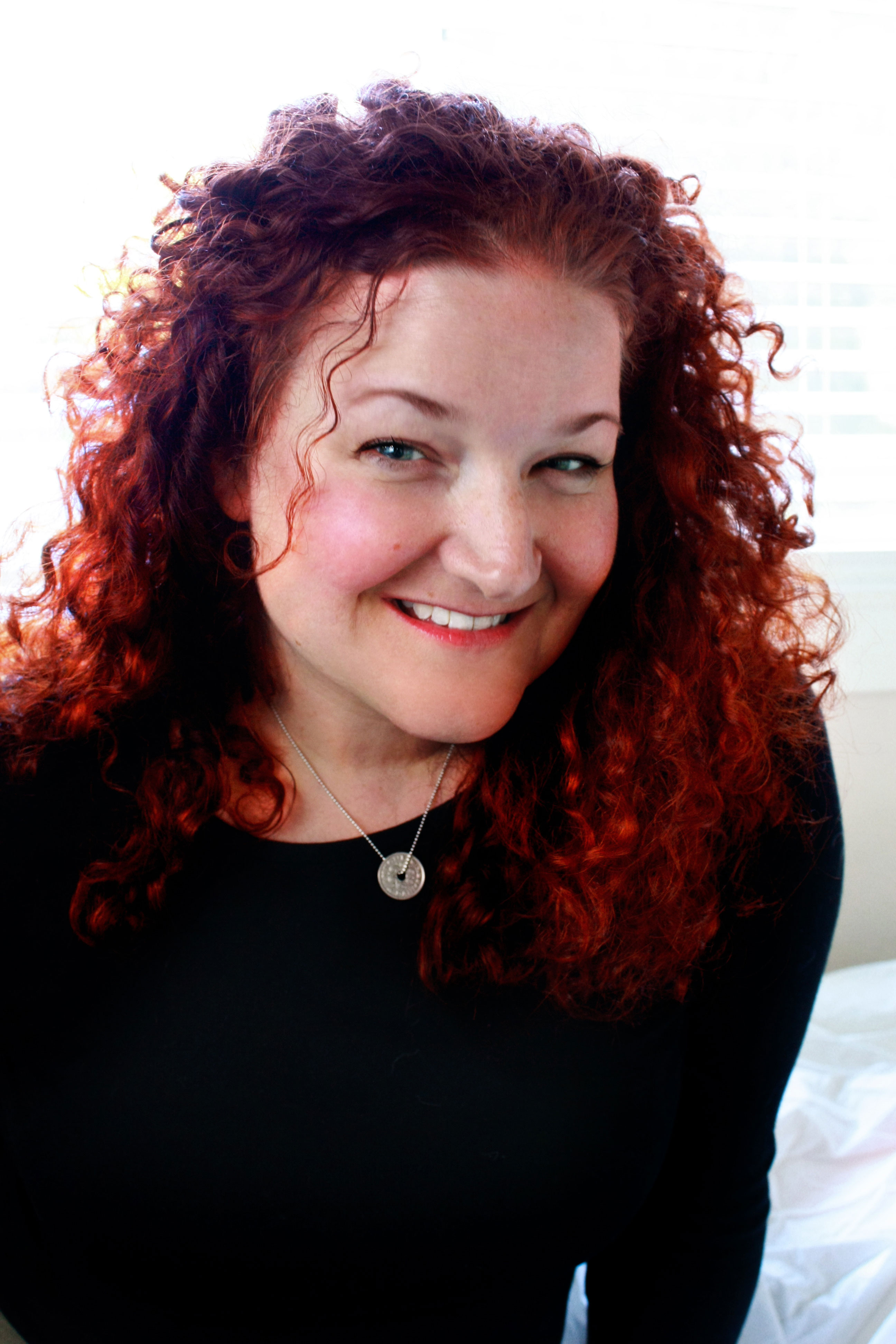
- Rapp in 2014
- Born: September 4, 1972 (age 54); Santa Rosa, California, U.S.
- Occupation: Voice actress
- Years active: 1999–present

Nicki Rapp (born September 4, 1972), often credited as Nikki Rapp, is an American voice actress known for providing the voices for Lili Zanotto in Psychonauts, Morgan LeFlay in Tales of Monkey Island, Lilly in Telltale Games' The Walking Dead, and the children in several games in The Sims franchise.

== Career ==
Rapp grew up in Santa Rosa, California and attended the American Academy of Dramatic Arts, where she studied theater. At the advice of one of her instructors, she began taking classes in voice acting, landing parts as children and toys.

Her first paid job as a voice actor was in 1999, and in 2003 she was cast to provide voices for children for The Sims franchise. Rapp was cast as Lili in the 2005 game Psychonauts. She was also the voice actress of the character Jun Wang in ObsCure II. She was cast to provide the voice of Morgan LeFlay in the 2009 title Tales of Monkey Island, developed by Telltale Games. Telltale Games cast Rapp in a second game, Sam & Max: The Devil's Playhouse, where she provided the voices of Sammun-Mak and Sam Jr., a cockroach. Rapp also provided the voice for Lilly in the 2012 game The Walking Dead, her third casting by Telltale Games. She reprised the role in The Walking Dead: The Final Season.

== Filmography ==
Year	Title	Role	Notes
2000	Arthur's Camping Adventure	Muffy Crosswife	
2001	Arthur's Kindergarten	Muffy Crosswife	
2001	Arthur's Preschool	Muffy Crosswife	Credited as Nikki Rapp
2001	Arthur's 1st Grade	Muffy Crosswife, Bitzi Baxter	Credited as Nikki Rapp
2001	Nicktoons Nick Tunes	Marmoset	Credited as Nikki Rapp
2002–2013 / 2016	The Sims Series	Sim	Credited as Nikki Rapp
2002	The ClueFinders: Mystery Mansion Arcade	Joni Savage	Credited as Nikki Rapp
2003	Arthur's Pet Chase	Muffy Crosswire, Prunella Deegan	Credited as Nicky Rapp
2003	Arthur's Sand Castle Contest	Muffy Crosswire, Prunella Deegan	
2005	Psychonauts	Lili Zanotto / Squeaky Flower / Squeaky Thistle	Credited as Nikki Rapp
2007	ObsCure II	Jun Wang	Credited as Nikki Rapp
2009	Tales of Monkey Island	Morgan LeFlay	5 episodes
2010	Sam & Max: The Devil's Playhouse	Sammun-Mak, Sam Jr.	Credited as Nikki Rapp
2012	The Walking Dead: Season One	Lilly	3 episodes; credited as Nikki Rapp
2013	Dawngate	Dibs, Moya.	Credited as Nikki Rapp
2014	Broken Age	Dead Eye Courtney	
2014	Chronology: Time Changes Everything	Snail	Credited as Nikki Rapp
2015	Long Live the Royals	Alex	4 episodes
2016	Firewatch	Lily McClain - Teen 2	Credited as Nikki Rapp
2017	Psychonauts in the Rhombus of Ruin	Lili Zanotto	
2018–2019	The Walking Dead: The Final Season	Lilly	3 episodes; credited as Nikki Rapp
2021	Psychonauts 2	Lili Zanotto	
