= Zurk =

Zurk may refer to:

- Lisa M. Zurk (1962–2022), American expert on underwater acoustics
- ZURK, code name for Shigatse Peace Airport
- Zurk joint, a metal fitting used in mechanical systems to feed lubricants
- Zurk's Learning Safari and Zurk's Rainforest Lab, 1990s educational software
- Zurks, enemy characters in Stray (video game)
