= Sam Johnson (defensive back) =

American football player (born 1959)

Profile
- Position: Defensive back

Personal information
- Born: May 18, 1959 (age 67); Manchester Township, North Carolina, U.S.
- Listed height: 6 ft 1 in (1.85 m)
- Listed weight: 195 lb (88 kg)

Career information
- High school: Arundel (Gambrills, Maryland)
- College: Maryland (1977–1980)
- NFL draft: 1981: 6th round, 155th overall pick

Career history
- 1981: Detroit Lions*
- 1981–1982: Toronto Argonauts
- 1983: Montreal Concordes*
- * Offseason or practice squad member only

Samuel Levi Johnson III (born May 18, 1959) is an American former professional football defensive back who played one season with the Toronto Argonauts of the Canadian Football League (CFL). He was selected by the Detroit Lions in the sixth round of the 1981 NFL draft after playing college football at the University of Maryland, College Park.

== Early life and college ==
Samuel Levi Johnson III was born on May 18, 1959, in Manchester Township, North Carolina. He played high school football at Arundel High School in Gambrills, Maryland.

Johnson was a member of the Maryland Terrapins of the University of Maryland, College Park from 1977 to 1980 and a three-year letterman from 1978 to 1980. He recorded one interception for 18 yards in 1978. During the 1979 season, he totaled two interceptions for 0 yards and 12 punt returns for 135 yards. Johnson's 11.3 yards per punt return was the highest in the Atlantic Coast Conference that season. As a senior in 1980, he accumulated one interception for 22 yards, six punt returns for 34 yards, five kick returns for 189 yards, and one reception for 16 yards.

== Professional career ==
Johnson was selected by the Detroit Lions in the sixth round, with the 155th overall pick, of the 1981 NFL draft. He was released by the Lions on August 24, 1981.

Johnson signed with the Toronto Argonauts of the Canadian Football League (CFL) after his release from the Lions but did not play in any games for Toronto during the 1981 CFL season. He was named the CFL's Defensive Star of the Week for Week 1 of the 1982 season. On September 10, 1982, it was reported that Johnson had undergone knee surgery and would miss the rest of the season. Overall, he played in three games for the Argonauts in 1982, recording two interceptions for nine yards, one sack, and one fumble recovery. In 1983, Argonauts head coach Bob O'Billovich attempted to convert Johnson to linebacker. However, it was not successful and Johnson was released in mid June 1983.

On June 21, 1983, it was reported that Johnson had been claimed off waivers by the Montreal Concordes of the CFL. However, he was suspended by the Concordes after refusing to report to the team.
