= Shanghai: Dynasty =

- Developers: Quicksilver Software; Presage Software
- Publisher: Activision
- Platforms: Windows; Macintosh
- Release: 1997

Shanghai: Dynasty is a 1997 video game developed by Quicksilver Software and published by Activision.

== Gameplay ==
The game presents a collection of Shanghai tile‑matching layouts, including new arrangements alongside those previously seen in Shanghai II: The Dragon's Eye. In addition to solitaire-style layouts, it offers several multiplayer modes that allow participants to compete either locally or through internet or modem connections, with each player attempting to accumulate the highest point total. The game features multiple tilesets, each paired with its own background that animates when a layout is successfully completed and then displays a fortune through varying animation sequences. Alongside the Shanghai variants, the package includes a full implementation of Mah‑jongg, whose rules and winning hands are detailed extensively in the accompanying manual and reference cards for both Chinese and Western versions.

== Development ==
Presage Software contributed Art and Audio to the Macintosh and Windows 95 versions of Shanghai: Dynasty.

== Reception ==
Reception

Review scores
Publication	Score
All Game Guide	4.5/5
Computer Games Magazine	4.5/5
Computer Gaming World	3/5
PC Player	76%
Power Play	74%

Games Domain called Shanghai: Dynasty "addicting" Macworld praised the graphics in Shanghai: Dynasty.
