= Learn to Program BASIC =

- Developer: Presage Software
- Release: 1998
- Operating system: Macintosh; Windows

Learn to Program BASIC is a software CD-ROM from Interplay Productions. It is for ages 8 and up.

== Summary ==
Learn to Program BASIC is a program that introduces middle school kids to the beginning concepts of computer programming. It teaches users BASIC, the beginners' programming language.

== Development ==
Presage Software designed and developed the Macintosh and Windows95 versions of Learn to Program BASIC. A Junior High Edition of Learn to Program BASIC was released in 1998.

== Reception ==
Kids Domain called the Jr. Edition of Learn to Program BASIC unique. Columbia Daily Tribune highly recommened Learn to Program BASIC.
