= William E. Martin =

American songwriter

- Born: October 8, 1945; Washington, D.C., U.S.
- Died: January 27, 2016 (aged 70); Camden, London, England
- Occupations: Musician, screenwriter, songwriter, voice actor
- Years active: 1969–2006

William E. Martin (October 8, 1945 – January 27, 2016), also credited as Bill E. Martin and Bill Martin, was an American musician, screenwriter, songwriter and voice actor.

== Life and career ==
A friend of Monkees member Michael Nesmith, Martin wrote the first song ("All of Your Toys") to be recorded with all four Monkees singing and playing. However, the song's copyright was owned by Tickson Music, for whom Martin worked; Screen Gems, who supervised music selection for the Monkees, had a rule that only Screen Gems-owned material could be released, and Tickson Music refused to sell the copyright. Martin took the setback in stride, signed a new contract with Screen Gems, and the band recorded his "The Door into Summer" (with its title inspired by Robert A. Heinlein's novel).

A later teaming with singer-songwriter Harry Nilsson resulted in the song "Rainmaker", released in two different versions by Nilsson (on single and on LP) in 1969. Nilsson also covered some of Martin's songs, including "Fairfax Rag" and "City Life". Martin released a concept album in 1970, titled Bill Martin's Concerto for Head Phones and Contra-Buffoon in Asia Minor. It failed to sell. Shortly after their initial collaboration, Nilsson's film The Point would feature Martin's voice talent in the character of the Rockman.

Martin also wrote the song "Evergreen (Earth Anthem)", which was recorded by Cyrus Faryar, The Turtles, and Dan Fogelberg, among others.

Martin co-starred with Michael Nesmith in his Grammy-winning Elephant Parts in 1981, and Nesmith also produced An Evening with Sir William Martin, with Martin delivering a half-hour monologue dressed in a smoking jacket and parodying Orson Welles, interspersed with different character voices.

Among Martin's screenwriting credits was the 1987 film Harry and the Hendersons. Martin's first film voice role came in the 1971 animated film The Point as the Rock Man and later in the 1989 animated film Little Nemo: Adventures in Slumberland as the villainous Nightmare King. He also had a cameo role in Hey, Hey, It's the Monkees, the 1997 television film which reunited the full band. He was the model for Bigfoot in Harry and the Hendersons.

His voice skills also earned him roles in numerous animated series, including Teenage Mutant Ninja Turtles (taking over the role of Shredder after James Avery's departure from the role), Transformers, Challenge of the GoBots, and several Star Wars video games.

== Death ==
He died on January 27, 2016, aged 70.

== Filmography ==
=== Film ===
Year	Title	Role	Notes
1971	The Point	Rock Man (voice)	Television film
1981	Elephant Parts		Writer
1987	Harry and the Hendersons		Writer
1989	Asterix and the Big Fight	Prolix, Fulliautomatix (voice)	English dub
1992	Little Nemo: Adventures in Slumberland	Nightmare King (voice)	Credited as William E. Martin
1997	Hey, Hey, It's the Monkees	Tour Guide	Television film
1999	Dash and Lilly	Croupier	Television film

=== Television ===
Year	Title	Role	Notes
1984	Mighty Orbots	Tor, Umbra (voice)	Episode: "Magnetic Menace"
1985	Amazing Stories	Guard	Episode: "Mummy Daddy"
1986	The Transformers	Broadside (voice)	4 episodes
1986	The Centurions	(voice)	64 episodes
1986	Karate Kommandos	Claw (voice)	5 episodes
1986—1990	The Real Ghostbusters	Samhain (voice)	3 episodes
1994—1996	Teenage Mutant Ninja Turtles	Shredder (voice)	7 episodes
1996	Aaahh!!! Real Monsters	Race Announcer, Commanding Voice (voice)	Episode: "The Master Monster/Slumber Scare"

=== Video games ===
Year	Title	Voice role	Notes
1993	Conquest of the New World	Introduction Voice	Credited as Bill E. Martin
1995	Stonekeep	Wahooka	
1996	Chess Mates	Voice of Wigby	Credited as Bill Martin
1996	Star Wars: X-Wing vs. TIE Fighter	Red Group Leader	Credited as Bill E. Martin
1998	Star Wars: Rebellion	Red Group Leader	
1999	Star Wars: Episode I – The Phantom Menace	Bith Merchant, Fisherman, Lizard boy, others	Credited as Bill E. Martin
1999	Baldur's Gate: Tales of the Sword Coast	Fake Durlag Doppelganger, Dwarwen Characters	
1999	Star Wars: X-Wing Alliance	Cmdr. Devers, Imperial Officer	
2000	Baldur's Gate II: Shadows of Amn	Korgan Bloodaxe, Bregg	Credited as Bill E. Martin
2000	Star Wars: Force Commander	A-Wing Pilot, Abridon Refugee	Credited as Bill E. Martin
2001	Baldur's Gate II: Throne of Bhaal	Korgan Bloodaxe	Credited as Bill E. Martin
2001	Baldur's Gate: Dark Alliance	Torgier	
2002	Star Wars: Bounty Hunter	Male Civilian #3, Smootie, Beast Handler	
2003	Star Wars: Knights of the Old Republic	Nurik Sandral, Davin Kotras, Garouk, others	Credited as Bill E Martin
2004	Champions of Norrath	(voice)	Credited as Bill E Martin
2005	Champions: Return to Arms	(voice)	
2006	Sin Episodes: Emergence	Garrison, Dock Workers	
