= List of Trivial Pursuit editions =

This is a list of Trivial Pursuit editions and their trivia categories.

== Master game sets and subsidiary card sets ==
Title	Year	Countries				/		
Trivial Pursuit Master Game - Genus Edition (Original)	1981		Geography	Entertainment	History	Art & Literature	Science & Nature	Sports & Leisure
Trivial Pursuit Subsidiary Card Set - All-Star Sports Edition	1983	USA/Canada	Both: Nicknames	Both: Football	Both: Catch All	USA: Basketball; Canada: Hockey	Both: Baseball	Both: Numbers
Trivial Pursuit Master Game - Baby Boomer Edition	1983		Television	Stage & Screen	Nightly News	Publishing	Lives & Times	R.P.M.
Trivial Pursuit Master Game - Silver Screen Edition	1983		Settings	Titles	Off Screen	On Screen	Production	Portrayals
Trivial Pursuit Master Game - Genus II Edition	1984		Geography	Entertainment	History	Art & Literature	Science & Nature	Sports & Leisure
Trivial Pursuit Master Game - Young Players Edition	1984		People & Places	Good Times	Science & Technology	Art & Culture	Natural World	Games & Hobbies
Trivial Pursuit Subsidiary Card Set - Young Players Edition	1985		People & Places	Good Times	Science & Technology	Art & Culture	Natural World	Games & Hobbies
Trivial Pursuit Master Game - RPM Edition	1985	USA/UK	Cover Notes	Your Mother Should Know	Fifties	Sixties	After the Beatles	Anything Goes
Trivial Pursuit Subsidiary Card Set - Welcome to America Edition	1985		America	Americans	Journey through America	Ship to Shore	Made in America	The Melting Pot
Trivial Pursuit Master Game - Walt Disney Family Edition	1985		World of Places	World of Music	World of People	World of Fantasy	World of Science	World of Leisure
Trivial Pursuit (Master Game) Featuring the Magic of Disney - Family Edition	1986		World of Places	World of Music	World of People	World of Fantasy	World of Science	World of Leisure
Trivial Pursuit for Juniors - First Edition	1987`		Every Day	Fun	Stories & Songs	Nature	Science	Games
Trivial Pursuit Master Game - A Genus Edition Volume II (Coleco)	1987		Geography	Entertainment	History	Art & Literature	Science & Nature	Sports & Leisure
Trivial Pursuit Master Game - A Genus Edition Volume II (Parker Brothers)	1987		Geography	Entertainment	History	Art & Literature	Science & Nature	Sports & Leisure
The Good Life Travel card set	1987	Canada						
War & Victory Travel card set	1987	Canada						
Bicentennial Edition (Master Game)	1987	Australia	Precentennial	Bicentennial	Folk Culture	Strine	My Country	Swagbag
Trivial Pursuit Master Game - The Vintage Years	1989		Products & Progress	Sports & Leisure	History	Personalities	Entertainment	Wild Card
Trivial Pursuit Master Game - The 1980's	1989		Personalities	Entertainment	In the News	That's Life	Sports & Leisure	Wild Card
Trivial Pursuit Subsidiary Card Set - Sports Enhancement	1989							
Trivial Pursuit - Édition (Note: All questions pertaining to France to honor the bicentennial of the storming of the Bastille)	1989	France	Geography, Economy & Society	Culture & Entertainment	History & Politics	Letters & Media	Art of Living	Sports & Recreation
Trivial Pursuit Subsidiary Card Set - Junior Edition (Note: International versions of the Young Players edition published in Dutch (De Tweede Editie Jonge Spelers Editie), German (Kartensatz mit 3,000 Fragen), French (Boite Complementaire 3,000 Nouvelles Questions - Edition Junior II), and Italian.)	1989	Netherlands, Germany, France, Italy						
Trivial Pursuit Master Game - The 1960's	1990		Personalities	Entertainment	Headlines	Music	Sports & Leisure	Wild Card
Trivial Pursuit for Juniors - Second Edition	1990		Every Day	Nature	Stories & Songs	Science	Fun	Games
Trivial Pursuit Master Game - TV Edition	1991		Classics	Sitcoms	Drama	Kids & Games	Stars	Wild Card
The Year in Review 1992	1992		Personalities	Entertainment	In the News	Around the World	Sports & Leisure	Wild Card
Trivial Pursuit 10th Anniversary	1992		Geography	Entertainment	History	Art & Literature	Science & Nature	Sports & Leisure
Family Edition	1992		People & Places	Entertainment	History	Science & Nature	Sports & Leisure	Wild Card
Trivial Pursuit All American Edition Master Game	1993		People	Entertainment	History	Places	Sports & Leisure	Wild Card
Trivial Pursuit Game Show Edition	1993		Geography	Entertainment	History	Art & Literature	Science & Nature	Sports & Leisure
The Year in Review 1993	1994		Personalities	Entertainment	In the News	Around the World	Sports & Leisure	Wild Card
Genus III	1994		People & Places	Arts & Entertainment	History	Science & Nature	Sports & Leisure	Wild Card
Junior – Third Edition	1994		Stories & Songs	Games	Every Day	Science	Fun	Nature
Genus IV	1996		People & Places	Arts & Entertainment	History	Science & Nature	Sports & Leisure	Wild Card
Junior – Fourth Edition	1996		Every Day	Nature	Stories & Songs	Fun	Games	Science
Star Wars Classic Trilogy Collector's Edition	1997		Characters	Weapons & Vehicles	History	Geography	Droids, Creatures & Aliens	Wild Card
Star Wars Episode I	1998		Characters	Weapons & Vehicles	History	Geography	Droids, Creatures & Aliens	Wild Card
Millennium	1998		People & Places	Arts & Entertainment	History	Science & Nature	Sports & Leisure	Wild Card
Know-It-All (Winning Moves)	1998		People & Places	Arts & Entertainment	History	Science & Nature	Sports & Leisure	Wild Card
Know-It-All New England (Winning Moves)	1998		People & Places	Arts & Entertainment	History	Science & Nature	Sports & Leisure	Wild Card
Know-It-All New York (Winning Moves)	1998		People & Places	Arts & Entertainment	History	Science & Nature	Sports & Leisure	Wild Card
Know-It-All Chicago (Winning Moves)	1998		People & Places	Arts & Entertainment	History	Science & Nature	Sports & Leisure	Wild Card
Warner Bros. (Note: In addition to questions about Warner Bros movies and TV shows (including Looney Tunes/Merrie Melodies and other Warner Bros. Animation projects), it also includes questions based on other Time Warner properties, including DC Comics, Hanna-Barbera, Cartoon Network, MAD Magazine, and assorted MGM properties owned via Turner Entertainment Co. (including Tom & Jerry and The Wizard of Oz).) (Note: This edition also contains a seventh category, "Picture Cards", on a separate set of cards with youth questions based on WB cartoons.)	1999		Movies	Cartoons	Television	Classics	Behind the Scenes	Anything Goes
Biographies	2000		People & Places	Arts & Entertainment	History	Science & Nature	Sports & Leisure	Wild Card
Genus V	2000		People & Places	Arts & Entertainment	History	Science & Nature	Sports & Leisure	Wild Card
Know-It-All TP (Note: Duplicated questions from 1998 Winning Moves edition but also included 32 additional cards)	2000		People & Places	Arts & Entertainment	History	Science & Nature	Sports & Leisure	Wild Card
Junior – Fifth Edition (Note: Edition had 1,200 questions but these were not categorised.)	2001		Whatever!	All About Nature	Yesterday	Today and Tomorrow	Music, Movies & More	Fun and Games
20th Anniversary	2002		Global View	Sound & Screen	News	The Written Word	Innovations	Game Time
Disney Animated Picture	2002		Once Upon a Time	Wonderful World of Disney	Monsters & Villains	Heroes & Heroines	Supporting Stars	Places & Props
Lord of the Rings Movie Trilogy Edition (Note: Rather than colors, this edition's categories are indicated with icons: leaf, badge, tree, ring, sword, ⊕)	2003		Good Characters	Evil Characters	Things	Place & History	Warfare	Making Movies
Volume 6	2003		People & Places	Arts & Entertainment	History	Science & Nature	Sports & Leisure	Wild Card
Globe Trotter (Master Game)	2003	UK	North America	Latin America	Oceania	Africa	Europe	Asia
Pop Culture	2003		Movies	TV	Music	Sports & Games	Buzz	Fads
90s	2004		Hanging	Oops	Wired	Viewing	Important	Trends
Book Lover's Edition	2004		Children's	Classics	Non-Fiction	Book Club	Authors	Book Bag
Trivial Pursuit for Kids – Volume 6	2004		Whatever!	All About Nature	Yesterday	Today & Tomorrow	Music, Movies & More	Fun & Games
Trivial Pursuit for Kids Nickelodeon Edition (Master Game)	2005		NickToons	Real Action	Here, There & Everywhere	Makin' Music	At the Movies	Go Wild!
Disney Edition	2005		Heroes & Heroines	Once Upon a Time	Monsters & Villains	Supporting Stars	Places & Props	Wonderful World of Disney
Pop Culture 2	2006		Movies	TV	Music	Sports & Games	Buzz	Fads
Totally '80s	2006		Headlines	Television	Movies	Music	Sports & Leisure	Wild Card
Trivial Pursuit – Greatest Hits - 80s	2007		Television	Wild Card	Headlines	Music	Movies	Sports & Leisure
Trivial Pursuit – Greatest Hits - 90s	2007		Viewing	Oops	Important	Trends	Hangin'	Wired
Trivial Pursuit – Greatest Hits - Pop Culture	2007		Television	Fads	Buzz	Music	Movies	Sports & Games
Trivial Pursuit 25th Silver Anniversary Edition	2008		Geography	Entertainment	History	Art & Literature	Science & Nature	Sports & Leisure
Trivial Pursuit - Best of Genus	2008		People & Places	Arts & Entertainment	History	Science & Nature	Sports & Leisure	Wild Card
Trivial Pursuit - Family '08	2008		People & Places	Entertainment	History	Wild Card	Science & Nature	Sports & Leisure
Trivial Pursuit: The Beatles Collector's Edition	2009		The Beatles In America	Albums & Singles	History	Songs	On Their Own	Movies
Trivial Pursuit Team	2009		People & Places	Entertainment	History	Arts & Literature	Science & Nature	Sports & Leisure
Trivial Pursuit Bet You Know It	2010		Geography	Entertainment	History	Arts & Literature	Science & Nature	Sports & Leisure
Trivial Pursuit Master Edition I	2010		Geography	Entertainment	History	Art & Literature	Science & Nature	Sports & Leisure
Trivial Pursuit - The Rolling Stones	2010		Hot Rocks	Rewind	Rolled Gold	In Concert	Story of the Stones	No Stone Unturned
Trivial Pursuit - Disney For All	2011							
Trivial Pursuit - Classic Rock (Master Game)	2011		More Than A Feeling (Songs, albums, inspiration and more about the music)	Life In The Fast Lane (Tours, venues, live albums and live appearances)	I'm Just A Singer (Personal stories and biographical information)	Purple Haze (Album covers, artwork and music videos)	Touch Of Grey (Recent projects, tours and stories)	Born To Be Wild (Wild card category)
Trivial Pursuit - Power Rangers 20th Anniversary Edition	2013		Rangers Gear	Allies and Villains	Rangers and their Zords	The Legacy	Behind the Power	Wild Card
Trivial Pursuit World of Warcraft Edition (Master Game)	2013		Geography	Player Characters	Lore	Loot	Villains	Encounters
Trivial Pursuit Party	2013		Geography	Entertainment	History	Art & Literature	Science & Nature	Sports & Leisure
Trivial Pursuit 2000s	2016		Places	Entertainment	Events	The Arts	Science & Tech	Sports & Hobbies
Trivial Pursuit: Classic Edition	2016		Geography	Entertainment	History	Art & Literature	Science & Nature	Sports & Leisure
Trivial Pursuit X: Edgy Adult Edition	2016		Geography	Entertainment	History	Art & Literature	Science & Nature/Tech	Sports & Leisure
Trivial Pursuit: World of Harry Potter Ultimate Edition	2018		Objects & Artifacts	Slytherin House, Death Eaters & The Dark Arts	Animals, Magical Creatures & Magical Beings	Witches, Wizards, Ghosts & Muggles	Hogwarts, Other Locations & Transportation	Spells, Potions & Other Magic
Trivial Pursuit: 40th Anniversary Ruby Edition (also includes Remember When? 1979–2018 questions)	2019		Geography	Entertainment	History	Arts & Literature	Science & Technology	Sports & Leisure
Trivial Pursuit Back to the 80s (Master Game)	2019		Movies	TV	Music	Famous People & Events	Trends, Tech & Fun	Stranger Things
Trivial Pursuit: Decades – 2010 to 2020	2021		Playlist	Bingeworthy	Culture	News Alert	Break the Internet	Game On
Trivial Pursuit: Dungeons & Dragons Ultimate Edition	2022		Dungeons & Adventures	Monsters	History	Cosmology	Characters	Magic & Miscellany
Trivial Pursuit: Horror Ultimate Edition	2020		Comedy	Psychological	Monster	Slasher	Paranormal	Gore & Disturbing
Trivial Pursuit	2026		Geography	Entertainment	History	Art & Literature	Science & Technology	Sports & Leisure

== Mini packs ==
Trivial Pursuit mini packs contain 120 cards with 720 questions in the standard six-color format but no categories.

- Trivial Pursuit Mini Pack - Sports (1987)
- Trivial Pursuit Mini Pack - Rock & Pop (1987)
- Trivial Pursuit Mini Pack - The Good Life (1987)
- Trivial Pursuit Mini Pack - War & Victory (1987)
- Trivial Pursuit Mini Pack - Flicks (1989)
- Trivial Pursuit Mini Pack - TV (1989)
- Trivial Pursuit Mini Pack - Wild Card (1989)
- Trivial Pursuit Mini Pack - Country Music (1993)

== Atypical editions/rules ==
BLUE	PINK	YELLOW	BROWN	GREEN	ORANGE

- Trivial Pursuit Pocket Player Set - Boob Tube (1987)

The Boob Tube edition has no categories, but the cards still have six questions, each with the usual colors.

- Trivial Pursuit Pocket Player Set - TP's People (1987)

The TP's people edition has no categories, but the cards still have six questions, each with the usual colors.

- Trivial Pursuit Mini Game - Family Edition (1993) - Kraft General Foods in conjunction with Horn Abbot Ltd.

A set of two games, version one (green box) and version two (yellow box). Each mini game contained 20 game cards - 10 cards for adults and 10 cards for children, 1 die, 2 scorecards, and a set of rules. These were part of a promotion, either attached to a different product or a mail-in submission.

People & Places	Entertainment	History	Science & Nature	Sports & Leisure	Wild Card

- Picture Pursuit (1994)

People & Places	Art & Entertainment	History	Science & Nature	Sports & Leisure	Wild Card

- In Pursuit (2001)

This variant on the game is more team-oriented, with different "totems" to represent who leads and follows; team members can challenge the other team for control, or alternate "overthrow" the leader to assume that role.

Who or Where	Pop Culture	Headlines	Science & Technology	Sports & Games	Wild Card

- Trivial Pursuit X (Explicit Content - Adults Only) (2017)

Edgy trivia that leaves its mark! Every time a player gives a wrong answer, an "X" is stamped on their forehead. Includes 400 trivia cards, rubber stamp with ink and instructions. Produced by Hasbro.

- Trivial Pursuit Game: Stuff You Should Know Edition (2021)

History	Pop Culture	Myths, Legends & Conspiracies	Science & Technology	Humans	SYSK Selects

== Bite Sized ==
Also sometime referred to as Winning Moves, bite size editions focus on a single area of knowledge. Each edition comes with a dice (often stylized) and 600 questions (Some editions also come with a cheese wheel). They can be used either as an addition to the main game in the same way as Mini Packs or as a stand-alone game.

In the stand-alone version the object is to win six cards.

Title	Year				/		
007	2015	Cast and Characters	The Films	Vehicles	Gadgets & Weapons	Locations	Crew/Behind the Scenes
The Beatles	2016	Songs	On Their Own	History	Albums	American Tours	Movies
Big Bang Theory, The	2014	Season 1 & 2	Season 3	Season 4	Season 5	Season 6	Season 7
Bob's Burgers	2020	The Belchers	Food	Wagstaff School	Songs & Music	Townies	Who Said It
Breaking Bad	2020	Partners in Crime	Empire Business	White Lies	The Streets	Chemists Behind the Chemistry	Más
Celebrity	2004	Fifteen Minutes of Fame	Relationships	Memorable Movie Moments	Before They Were Famous	Career Changes	Gossip Column
Doctor Who	2013	Time Lords	Companions	Episodes & Stories	Years & Dates	Monsters	Cast, Crew & Beyond
Dragonball Z	2018	Z Warriors	World Martial Arts and Other World Tournaments	Saiyan Saga (Episodes 1-35)	Frieza Saga (Episodes 36-107)	Cell Saga (Episodes 118-194)	Buu Saga (Episodes 200-291)
Entertainment	2008	TV	Music	Movies	Games	Books	Wild Card
Family	2003	People & Places	Good Times	Yesterdays	Art & Culture	Created World	Games & Leisure
Food & Drink	2008	Drink	Fine Dining	Fast Food	World Food	Ingredients	Techniques & Utensils
Friends (The TV Series)	2019	Season 8 & 9	Season 6 & 7	Season 3 & 4	Season 10	Season 1 & 2	Season 4 & 5
Genus	2003	Geography	Entertainment	History	Art & Literature	Science & Nature	Sports & Leisure
Girls Vs Guys - Girls	2007	TV	Chick Flicks	Chick Lit	Fashion	Music	Hunks
Girls Vs Guys - Guys	2007	Boy Toys	Sports	Action Films	Music	Babes	TV
Golden Girls, The	2018	Family Matters	Who Said It?	Locations	The Ladies	Words of Wisdom	Men of the Night
Grey's Anatomy	2024	Welcome To The Game	It's A Beautiful Day to Save Lives	Doctor's Orders	Dance It Out!	You're My Person	McDreamy or McSteamy
Harry Potter - Volume 1	2014	Hogwarts	Magical Spells & Potions	Magical People	The Dark Arts	Animals & Magical Creatures	Magical Objects
Harry Potter - Volume 2	2015	Hogwarts	Magical Spells & Potions	Magical People	The Dark Arts	Animals & Magical Creatures	Magical Objects
Horror Movie Edition	2018	Gore/Disturbing	Psychological	Slasher	Monster	International	Paranormal
It's Always Sunny In Philadelphia	2023	Episodes	Quotes	About The Gang	Friends & Enemies	What Happens at Paddy's...	Schemes and Plans
Football Teams - FC Barcelona	2016	Players & Managers	Historic Matches & La Liga Battles	Trophies & Competitions	Club Secrets & Camp Nou History	International Stars & Records	Wild Card/General Club Trivia
Football Teams - Inter	2019	Coaches	League	Curiosities	Players	International Matches	Victories
Football Teams - Juventus	2020	Coaches	League	Curiosities	Players	International Matches	Victories
London Games 2012	2011	London 2012	British Medalists	Gold Medal Winners	Olympic History	Sports	Olympic Venues
Lord of the Rings	2018	Forces of Evil	Forces of Good	Battles	Things	Making the Movies	Locations and History
Manchester United	2026	Kit Room	Captains	Managers	Wild Card	Legends	Stadiums
Music	2008	Soundtracks	Off The Record	Bands	Solo Artist	Pure Music	Downloads
National Constitution Center: Exploring America's Story	2026	Branches of Government	American Revolution	We the People	Voices of America	Know Your State	History Happened Here
National Parks - Travel Edition	2016	Natural Wonders	Battlefields and Historic Sites	Cultural Heritage	Science and Nature	Wildlife	Wild Card
Nightmare Before Christmas, The	2022	Trick or Treat	Songs	Behind the Scenes	Pumpkin King	Christmas Town	Halloween Town
Parks and Recreation	2024	Say What?	Parks Department	Tour the City	Treat Yo' Self!	Citizens of Pawnee	Very Good Category (All Things Ron)
Party Quiz (German)	2019	Travel	Lifestyle	Film, TV & the Arts	Music	Who Am I?	Food & Drink
Polski Sport (Polish)	2018	Football/Soccer	Volleyball	Handball	Ski Jumping	Speedway	Olympic Games
Quality Street	2004	Global View	Sound & Screen	News	The Written Word	Innovations	Game Time
R&R	2008	Fun and Games	Party Occasions	Apps & Snacks	Dinner & Drink	Travel Spots	Chillin' & Thrillin'
Rick and Morty	2018	Frenemies	Technology & Science	Locations	Rick and the Family	History & Events	Wubalubadubdub Wild Card
Schitt$ Creek	2023	Fast Forward to Success	Who Said What	Townsfolk	Where Everyone Fits In	Love That Journey For Me	The Roses
Shakespeare	2018	Comedies	Histories	Tragedies	Characters	Biography	Legacy
Sports & Games	2008	Computer & Board games	Records	Rules	Venues	Teams	Sports & Chance
SpongeBob SquarePants	2020	Characters	Songs	Locations	The Krusty Krab	Seasons 1-6	Seasons 7-12
Star Wars	2005	Characters	Weapons & Vehicles	History	Geography	Droids, Creatures & Aliens	Wild Card
Walking Dead, The	2017	Comic: People; TV: Episodes	Comic: Locations; TV: The Dead	Comic: Events; TV: Events/Milestones	Comic: Issue Number; TV: Characters	Comic: The Dead; TV: Wild Card	Comic: Wild Card; TV: Locations
World Football	2005	Heroes & Villains	League Football	Record Breakers	Fan Facts	World Cup	Free-Kick
World of Dinosaurs!, The	2014	Traits	Pop Culture	Friends, Foes and Families	Discoveries	Habits	Name-it
World of Wildlife!, The	2016	Birds	Reptiles	Invertebrates	Mammals	Fish	Amphibians

== Multimedia editions ==
Title	Year	Platform				/			
Trivial Pursuit - The Computer Game (English)	1986	Commodore 64							
Trivial Pursuit - The Computer Game (German)	1986	Commodore 64							
Trivial Pursuit: Young Players Edition	1986	Commodore 64							
Trivial Pursuit: Baby Boomer Edition	1986	Commodore 64							
Trivial Pursuit: Die Neue Generation (German)	1988	Commodore 64							
Trivial Pursuit - A New Beginning	1988	Commodore 64/ Amstrad/ ZX Spectrum/ Amiga							
Star Trek Edition VCR Game	1995	VCR	Name: Episode/Film Title	What: Place/Event/Object	Stop: Episode/Film/Character/Planet	Who: Character/Alien/Actor	Wild: General Trivia	Watch: Observation	
Interactive Multimedia Game	1994-1997	CD-ROM/Sega CD	Wild Card	Arts & Entertainment	History	People & Places	Science & Nature	Sports & Leisure	
Trivial Pursuit: The Best of Genus	1997	Electronic handheld game	People & Places	Arts & Entertainment	History	Science & Nature	Sports & Leisure	Wild Card	
Trivial Pursuit: NASCAR Edition	1998	Electronic handheld game	NASCAR	Pits	Teams	Tracks	Drivers	Wild Card	
Trivial Pursuit: NFL Edition	1998	Electronic handheld game	Players	Teams	History	Postseason	Super Bowl	Wild Card	
Trivial Pursuit: MLB Edition	1999	Electronic handheld game	Players	Teams	History	Records	Postseason	Wild Card	
Millennium	1999	CD-ROM	People & Places	Arts & Entertainment	History	Science & Nature	Sports & Leisure	Wild Card	
Pop Culture	2003	DVD	TV	Fads	Buzz	Music	Movies	Sports & Games	
Trivial Pursuit: SNL DVD Edition	2003	DVD	Sketches	Impressions	Parodies	Characters	SNL Etc.	The Show	
Lord of the Rings	2004	DVD	TV	Fads	Buzz	Music	Movies	Sports & Games	
Unhinged	2004	Xbox, PS2	People & Places (Celebrity Host: Brooke Burke)	Arts & Entertainment (Celebrity Host: Whoopi Goldberg)	History (Celebrity Host: John Cleese)	Science & Nature (Celebrity Host: Bill Nye the Science Guy)	Sports & Leisure (Celebrity Host: Terry Bradshaw)	Wild Card (Celebrity Host: John Ratzenberger)	
Star Wars Saga 2	2005	DVD	The Cantina	The Force	Heroes, Villains and Scoundrels	The Saga	A Galaxy Far, Far Away	Hyperspace	
Pop Culture DVD 2	2005	DVD	TV	Fads	Buzz	Music	Movies	Sports & Games	
DVD for Kids	2006-2012	DVD							
Unlimited	2007	PS2							
Totally On-Screen	2007	DVD	Movies & TV	Wild Card	History	Music	Arts & Science	Sports & Games	
Bring on the 90s Edition	2007	PC	Wired	Important	Oops	Trends	Hanging	Viewed	
War of the Wedges	2008	DVD	TV	Trends	Innovation	Music	Film	Sports & Games	
Trivial Pursuit Digital Choice	2008	Digital questions							
Trivial Pursuit	2009	Wii, PS2, PS3, Xbox 360, iPhone, iPod Touch							
Trivial Pursuit: Bet You Know It	2011	Wii							
Trivial Pursuit Master Edition	2011	iPad, iPhone					date=2016-08-21 }}, ign.com</ref>	2015	PlayStation 4, Xbox One, Xbox 360, PlayStation 3, Nintendo Switch
Trivial Pursuit: Live 2!	2022	Xbox One, Xbox Series X and Series S, PlayStation 4, Nintendo Switch							
Trivial Pursuit Infinite	2024	PC & Mobile							

== Books ==
Title	Year	Publisher	ISBN
Trivial Pursuit: The Authorized Game Book	1987	Bantam Press & Guinness	978-0552133326
Trivial Pursuit: Rock and Pop, The Authorized Game Book	1987	Guinness	978-0851128702
Trivial Pursuit: The Authorized Game Book Vol. 2	1987	Bantam Press & Guinness	
The Official Trivial Pursuit Quiz Book: You Can't Make This Stuff Up!	2001	Welbeck Publishing Group/Carlton Books	978-1842221853
The Trivial Pursuit Quiz Book	2002	Carlton Books	978-1842221600
The Ultimate Trivial Pursuit Question and Answer Book	2009	Sterling Publishing	978-1402770654
Trivial Pursuit Quiz Book	2023	Farshore	978-0008595098
Trivial Pursuit Quiz Book: Updated Edition	2026	HarperCollins	978-0008827632
