= Toys-to-life =

Video game feature

Toys-to-life is a video game feature using physical figurines or action figures to interact within the game. There are several technologies used to make physical figurines appear in game such as image recognition, quick response (QR) codes, Bluetooth and near field communication (NFC). Depending on the technology, the game can determine the individual figurine's proximity, and save a player's progress data to a storage medium located within that piece. It was one of the most lucrative branches of the video game industry especially during the late 1990s and 2010s, with the Skylanders franchise alone selling more than $3 billion worth over the course of four years.

Although modern versions use NFC technology, an early example of such a game is Redbeard's Pirate Quest: Interactive Toy created by Zowie in 1999. This PC game came with a plastic pirate ship that connects to the printer port, and players can interact with the game by placing the separate pirate figurines on various places in the ship, and moving or rotating them. Other precursors to these kinds of games include the Captain Power and the Soldiers of the Future, Dennō Bōkenki Webdiver and Daigunder toylines, where children could plug Gladion and Daigunder into their TV screens to use as controls, and the other toys could interact with the game through infrared sensors. Toys-to-life games generally use a third-person camera view, and have in-game power-up figurines. Toys-to-life games generally have an accompanying portal device that is used to "transport" the figurine's character and associated player data into the game. The figurines can be transferred from each game in the franchise, possibly resetting with every different installment.

== Pre-NFC interactive game toys ==
=== Captain Power and the Soldiers of the Future (1987) ===
Based on the TV series, a light gun type games with a VHS tape and a spaceship toy that interacts with TV through infrared.

=== Datach Joint ROM System (1992-1993) ===
The earliest predecessor to toys-to-life on a Nintendo platform was released only in Japan by Bandai, the Datach Joint ROM System cartridge add-on for the Family Computer featured a barcode reader. Most games released for the Datach came bundled with cards which can be scanned into the reader by swiping from left to right. The Datach came with the pack-in game Dragon Ball Z: Gekitō Tenkaichi Budokai and allowed players to scan in fighters to play and battle.

=== ZXE-D: Legend of Plasmalite (1996) ===
Released only in Japan for the PlayStation by Bandai, this game came in a suitcase-sized cardboard box (complete with carrying handle) that contained 4 plastic robot model kits, similar to Bandai's Gunpla models. The game is a fighting game, in which two of the four models can be plugged in to the game console. The models have easily detachable limbs, and swapping the limbs on the models allows players to customize the limbs and abilities of the in-game robots.

=== Ellie's Enchanted Garden (1999) ===
A PC game developed by Zowie Intertainment that came with a plastic castle courtyard garden that connects to a USB port, players can interact with the PC game by placing figurines of a girl and several animals on various places, play skip rope, slide figurines from castle to forest to change the in-game environment. It was released in September 1999.

=== Redbeard's Pirate Quest (1999) ===
Another PC game developed by Zowie Intertainment. This time it came with a plastic pirate ship that connects to the printer port, and players can interact with the game by placing the separate pirate figurines on various places in the ship and moving or rotating them. It was released in September 1999.

=== Webkinz (2005-) ===
Webkinz from Ganz, released in 2005, were the first stuffed toys that unlock online content. Webkinz each came with a different "Secret Code" that gave access to the Webkinz World website and a virtual version of the toy for online play. While the toys have been discontinued, the Webkinz World website is still accessible for new players, with a new updated version being developed simultaneously.

=== Arcade Games (2005-present) ===
Various Japanese arcade games dispense collectible cards or plastic pucks that affect gameplay when scanned. A non-comprehensive list: Data Carddass, The Idolmaster, Mobile Suit Gundam: Arsenal Base, Mushiking: The King of Beetles, Oshare Majo: Love and Berry, Pokémon Mezastar, PriPara, Sangokushi Taisen, Super Sentai Battle: Dice-O

=== Mattel HyperScan (2006-2007) ===
Another predecessor to toys-to-life is Mattel's short-lived 2006 HyperScan game console. It focused on the same concept that toys-to-life products implemented, but instead of using figurines, they opted to use collectible trading cards instead. Due to poor sales and reception, only 5 games were produced for it. Those being Ben 10, Interstellar Wrestling League, Marvel Heroes, Spider-Man, and X-Men. All games were rated E10+ by the ESRB except for X-Men (The pack-in game) which was rated T. Two more games, Avatar: The Last Airbender and Nick Extreme Sports, were planned but were cancelled due to the console's commercial failure.

=== Easy-Link Internet Launch Pad (2007-2008) ===
A Fisher-Price brand toy that connects to USB, with figurines from various Playhouse Disney and PBS Kids shows such as Arthur, Barney & Friends, Bob the Builder, Cars, Clifford the Big Red Dog, Disney Princess, Dragon Tales, Fisher-Price themselves, Handy Manny, Higglytown Heroes, JoJo's Circus, Little Einsteins, Mickey Mouse Clubhouse, My Friends Tigger & Pooh, Sesame Street, The Wiggles, and Thomas & Friends that can be placed onto the pad to play games on their accompanying websites. Most of the websites are mostly defunct now.

=== U.B. Funkeys (2007-2010) ===
U.B. Funkeys (2007–2010) was a game using a physical circuit connecting figures to a USB 'Hub,' developed by Mattel, Arkadium, and Radica. It had multiple updates before it was discontinued. The game played similarly to social MMOs like Club Penguin and Habbo Hotel, with players being able to explore multiple large maps, play minigames, and decorate their own custom home. Each map was locked to a specific set of characters, each with their own unique hub room and minigame to play. The game saw five updates, including a Speed Racer film collaboration, but was discontinued in 2010 alongside the shutdown of its MMO functionality. A sixth update was planned themed around a DC Comics collaboration.

=== F.A.M.P.S. (2009–2011) ===
F.A.M.P.S. was a toys-to-life social application designed by Mattel, released under the "Girl Talk" label. Figurines used RFID technology to communicate with a PC, unlocking new minigames and customization options for the associated social network and users' computers. The application's physical disc only had an online installer, and the Windows version is presumed lost.

== Ongoing ==
=== Amiibo (2014–present) ===
Amiibo (2014) is a toys-to-life platform by Japanese company Nintendo that is available on the Wii U, 3DS, Switch, and Switch 2 consoles. It primarily features characters from Nintendo franchises, as well some third-party franchises from Super Smash Bros., Shovel Knight, and Mega Man. Launching in 2014 with figurines, Nintendo has since also deployed Amiibo-compatible playing cards, plush yarn toys, and even promotional cereal boxes. Unlike most other toys-to-life series, Amiibo does not have games dedicated exclusively to the use of the toys, but the characters are used throughout various games. Amiibo can save players' progress data and information per game, however many games only offer read-only functionality.

== Discontinued ==
=== Skylanders (2011–2022) ===
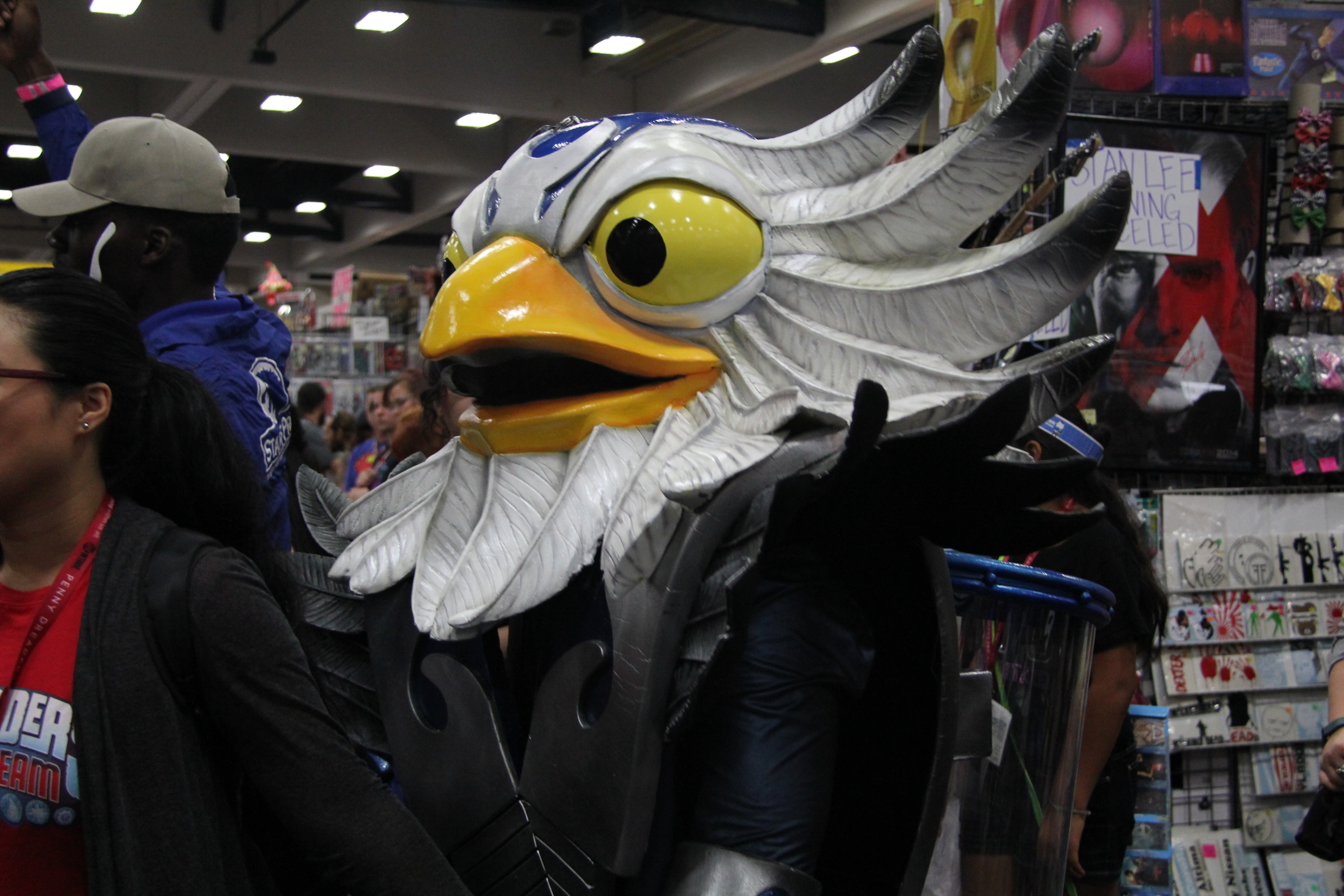
Jet-Vac from Skylanders

Skylanders (2011) is a toys-to-life video game series by American publisher Activision. Skylanders was the first toys-to-life title to use NFC figures, and thrust the genre into the mainstream due to its presence on home consoles. Since its first release, each year has seen a new installment in the series, totaling six as of 2016. Each game (except the switch version) has its own portal device and a different take on the premise than past games. They star the Skylander heroes and the evil antagonist Kaos. All current figurines are compatible with its most recent installment, Skylanders: Imaginators (2016). While new games were since published, it has not seen a new main console release that would follow the "toys to life" genre since then, due to Activision's desire to take an extended break from the main series. A mobile RPG spin-off, Skylanders: Ring of Heroes, was released worldwide on December 12, 2018, and developed by Com2Us. Ring of Heroes was revamped in December 2020; services for the game were terminated in early 2022. Following their acquisition of Activision Blizzard, Microsoft has expressed interest in continuing the Skylanders series. Other than that, there is no official information about the continuation of the "toys to life" aspect of the franchise.

=== Pokémon Rumble U (2013) ===
Pokémon Rumble U was Nintendo's first foray into the toys-to-life genre, released in 2013 for the Wii U. It is the first game that utilized the built-in NFC reader on the Wii U gamepad. In the game, players control Pokémon and engage in battle with other Pokémon. When figures are scanned with the NFC reader, they can be utilized in-game. In addition, if anything else with NFC technology is scanned into the game, the player will receive a random effect.

=== Disney Infinity (2013–2016) ===
Disney Infinity (2013) was a toys-to-life series based on Disney characters and franchises. Since the initial game's release in 2013, there had been three installments. Disney Infinity was the first game, focusing on Disney and Pixar characters. In 2014, Disney Infinity: Marvel Super Heroes was released as the second game, which focused on Marvel characters and properties. The third game, 2015's Disney Infinity 3.0, centered on the Star Wars franchise. All Disney Infinity figurines could interact with various games in the series. The line concluded in 2016, when Disney announced that production of the series had officially ceased, and that there would be no more future titles. "Gold Editions" of each game have since been released on Steam, containing a majority of the original content with the toys integrated into the games.

=== Telepods (2013–2015) ===
These figurines were used in Angry Birds mobile apps such as Angry Birds Star Wars II, Angry Birds Go!, Angry Birds Stella, and Angry Birds Transformers. Players put the included stand onto their device's camera and putting the figure onto the stand. The QR code below the figure would get scanned and the figure would "teleport" to the app as an unlockable or costume.

=== Disney Playmation (2015–2016) ===
Disney Playmation was a longer range (~10m) networked interactive role-playing game with wearable toys that supported BLE communications with phone apps. The product was sold in collaboration with Hasbro. The single-product story line delivered was based on the Marvel Iron Man universe. Other universes were announced before the product was terminated including Star Wars and Frozen.

=== Hero Portal (2014–2015) ===
A toys-to-life game made by Jakks Pacific. It was a console connected to a portal connected to plugs which the player connect to their TV. They placed the figures on the portal and they went to the player's game. It was short-lived. Due to poor sales, there were four themes released: DC Super Heroes, Teenage Mutant Ninja Turtles, Power Rangers, and DreamWorks Dragons.

=== Kamen Rider Summonride! (2014-2015) ===
Kamen Rider Summonride! was a short-lived Japan-exclusive game based on the popular Kamen Rider franchise, with a NFC component similar to other toys-to-life games. It was developed by Eighting and published by Bandai Namco Entertainment.

=== Sick Bricks (2015–2020) ===
A game by Spin Master with Lego-compatible figurines and builds. When players used their smartphones or tablets to scan their physical figurines, a digital representation of these figurines appeared in the game. The game took place in a small town called Sick City, which was under fire by a villain named Omega Overlord. Various heroes fought against him, and his goons would combine with each other to fight them off. There were various multi-packs and special blind bags containing the toys. While the game itself was free, the additional figures would cost money. There were only three waves of figures, all of which were released in 2015. Following the third wave's release, no additional information about the series was released, so it was assumed to be discontinued. The line was based on a 2015 cartoon series of the same.

=== Lego Dimensions (2015–2017) ===
Lego Dimensions (2015) was a toys-to-life game developed by Traveller's Tales that used physical Lego figures, featuring characters from various Warner Brothers and Lego franchises, as well as other third-party intellectual properties such as Back to the Future, The Simpsons, and many more. Some franchises, such as Adventure Time and Sonic the Hedgehog, had never seen releases in Lego format prior. The game involves a heavier emphasis on the physicality of the genre, with characters having vehicles that could be rebuilt into new forms, as well as mechanics that involved moving characters on the Toy Pad. No sequels were released, with new content being added through a series of "Year 2" updates. On October 23, 2017, Warner Bros. officially announced that they would not be developing further content for Lego Dimensions.

=== Starlink: Battle for Atlas (2018–2019) ===
Starlink: Battle for Atlas (2018) is Ubisoft's first step into the toys-to-life video game genre. The game doesn't require the use of the toys to be played, but the gameplay is enriched by using them. The interactive toys consist of three categories: ships (which consist of a body and two wings), weapons, and pilots. Pilots and ships are attached to controller mounts, which load the attached toy into the game instantly. Each loadout requires a pilot and ship body, but ship wings and weapons can be dynamically mixed, matched, and stacked using attachments on the ship bodies and wings. The game was developed by Ubisoft Toronto and released on October 16, 2018, for the PlayStation 4, Xbox One, and Nintendo Switch. The Switch version features an exclusive pilot and ship (Nintendo's Fox McCloud and his Arwing) within the game's starter pack. An all-digital edition was also released for all three consoles that contain most of the released physical toys in-game.

On April 3, 2019, it was announced that due to sales that fell below expectations, there would be no further releases of physical Starlink toys. Digital expansions, however, would continue to be released. In total, 8 ships, 16 weapons, and 11 pilots were released physically across 3 starter packs, 6 ship packs, 4 weapon packs, and 5 pilot packs. Controller mount packs were also released for each console that enabled co-op play with the physical toys.

=== Beyblade Burst (2016–2023) ===
Beyblade Burst is a multimedia franchise created by Takara Tomy and Hasbro. These are mostly toys but Hasbro's version has QR codes on the back. The Beyblade Burst app uses image recognition to transfer the toys into the video games.

=== Causality (2023–2025) ===
Causality is a physical–digital middleware platform by Clever Guerrilla Inc. that lets developers enable any NFC-tagged object including toys and merchandise to unlock digital content and experiences via smartphone, as opposed to separate NFC readers/peripherals in previous iterations of the concept. The platform offers a SaaS tool for developers, and a companion app for end-users, which functions as both an experience launcher/connector and a discovery tool. In May 2024, Clever Guerrilla released a trailer introducing the Causality integration for Roblox, enabling any developer to activate physical-digital connections of third-party products for players in their games. The trailer garnered several million views across Causality's social media channels. In August 2024, Causality was the highest-rated “Toys” product on Product Hunt, and in December 2024 it was demonstrated at Betaworks's Merge Hackathon as the “Unreal Engine for physical–digital activations.” At present Causality can be integrated into any environment capable of external API calls, including Browser-Based Games (BBGs), Unreal Engine, Unity and Godot. The Causality website claims that it can be used with any NFC tag type and that they need not be purchased through the company, offering integrated third-party hardware authentication for those chips that support it. In December 2025, Clever Guerrilla Inc.'s social media page shared a post from its CEO announcing that the company would cease operations, leaving the fate of the Causality platform undetermined.

=== The McDonald's Mcplay App (2013 - 2022) ===
The McDonald's Mcplay App, was a mobile app released in 2013 that featured a system where you could play mini games, many of which were only accessible via QR code scan of a toy from a Happy Meal, that toy being what the game is about. There does not appear to be any documentation on what Happy Meal specific games were released, so the 'toys to life' aspect of it is lost.

=== The 39 Clues Website (2008 - 2020) ===
The 39 clues website was a website that had a series of unlock-able mini games for its matching book series. You could unlock new missions whenever a new book would come out, you would be required to scan the books as well as cards that came with them in order to properly play.

=== Prodigy Math Game (2014 - present) ===
Prodigy Math game is an edutainment game focused on teaching school children how to use math skills, and later reading skills, via fun wizard battles that originally mimicked Pokémon to a very extreme level, though they have significantly changed their formula as of now. Though toys aren't needed to play any specific part of the game now, within brief periods during 2019 and 2021, they had toys that you would scan in with a one time use code, known as epics. Epics existed in the same way that pets would within the game, meaning you would use them in battle and you could walk around with them (although with regular pets walking and fighting were generally separated except for one limited time fox pet). The biggest difference between them was that when they were available, they had their own island that you could visit and put them in championship battles (again mirroring Pokémon a little too heavily) where you could acquire elusive statues as well as other trinkets for your house.

=== Taiko no Tatsujin DS: Great Yokai Battle (2010) ===
Players could unlock in-game costumes and songs by detecting sounds played by certain McDonald's happy meal toys using the microphone on the Nintendo DS.

=== TamaTown Tama-Go (2010) ===
A Gotchi figure can be connected to the Tamagotchi device to unlock in-game items, food, and games.

=== Tamagotchi P's (2012) ===
The Tamagotchi device has a slot for a removable pin called a "Tama Deco Pierce", with different pins providing different in-game items and pets.

=== Lightseekers: Awakening (2017–2020) ===
Lightseekers: Awakening was a multimedia franchise created by PlayFusion, an independent British studio co-founded by Mark Gerhard, the former CEO of RuneScape publisher Jagex. Its early development was partly financed via a Kickstarter crowdfunding campaign, which had raised $227,660 by November 2016. The Lightseekers brand consists of a toys-to-life role-playing video game (commonly referred to as Lightseekers RPG) and a trading card game. The toys-to-life video game was released for iOS and Android mobile platforms in May 2017. The Lightseekers RPG video game was free-to-play and does not require accessories to function, but players could purchase a line of interactive figures made in partnership with Tomy to enhance their experience. Figures could be decked with various accessories which modified the corresponding character's in-game appearance and abilities. They also incorporated a speaker for various one-liners, and a motion sensor allowing them to be used as a controller during flying segments. A second Lightseekers video game was released in January 2019 for the Nintendo Switch, but it was a virtual adaptation of the trading card game rather than a port of the toys-to-life RPG.

== See also ==
- Nintendo e-Reader
- Digital collectible card game
- Barcode games
- Neopets
- Mario Kart Live: Home Circuit
- R.O.B.
- Augmented reality
- Rhythm game accessories
- Exergaming
- Light gun
- Racing wheel
- 2010s in video games
