= Nickelodeon BrainBender =

- Developer: Human Code
- Publisher: Mattel Media
- Platform: Windows
- Release: 1999

Nickelodeon BrainBender, also known as Nickelodeon BrainBender: Puzzles and Activities, is a 1999 video game developed by Human Code and published by Mattel Media. It is based on sixteen Nickelodeon television characters.

== Gameplay ==
The player tackles eight short Nickelodeon‑themed activities built around quick tasks such as following visual patterns, matching character–color combinations, printing paper dominoes, or drawing characters with minimal guidance. Idle players are taunted by a PA announcer, and the cluttered interface requires clicking around to uncover functions like puzzle randomization or customization menus. Other activities let the player assemble cartoon choreographs, take snapshots, or create fill‑in‑the‑blank stories using component libraries, and an “E‑candy” feature allows sending these creations to friends who can view and play them without owning the game.

== Reception ==
Reception

Review scores
Publication	Score
All Game Guide	3/5
The Houston Chronicle	B

Kids Domain recommended Nickelodeon BrainBender to Nickelodeon fans. The Daily Journal called Nickelodeon BrainBender challenging.
