= Human Code =

American video game developer

- Founded: 1993
- Founders: Bill Holt; Chipp Walters; Liz Walker; Gary Gattis
- Fate: Acquired by Sapient Corporation
- Headquarters: Austin, Texas, United States
- Key people: David Palumbo (vice president)
- Number of employees: 70 (1998)

Human Code was a video game developer and multimedia design firm based in Austin, Texas.

== History ==
Human Code was founded in 1993 by Chipp Walters, Liz Walker, and Gary Gattis. Other founders included Bill Holt.

In 1995, Human Code acquired Japanese design firm IDEC. IDEC was later renamed Human Code Japan. The same year the company reported revenues of $2 million.

In 1998, Human Code started streaming nightly news broadcasts from local CBS affiliate K-EYE.

In 1999, Human Code helped design the software components of Zowie Intertainment's PlayZones toys. It also secured $5 million in venture capital funding to fuel its continued rapid market expansion.

By September 1999, Human Code employed 160 employees.

In February 2000, Human Code acquired Top Drawer Productions, a multimedia developer of custom e-learning applications for educational publishers and corporate training.

In August 2000, Human Code was acquired by Sapient Corporation for $103.8 million. (Note: Other sources say $135 million)

== Products ==
Year	Title	Platform(s)	Ref.
1993	Marsbook	Macintosh	
1994	The Cartoon History of the Universe	Windows	
1995	Nile: Passage to Egypt	Macintosh, Windows	
1995	Operation: Weather Disaster	Macintosh, Windows	
1996	Sky Trip America	Macintosh, Windows	
1996	Wishbone and the Amazing Odyssey	Macintosh, Windows	
1997	SchoolHouse Rock!: 1st-4th Grade Math Essentials	Macintosh, Windows	
1997	Geobee Challenge	Macintosh, Windows	
1998	Barbie Riding Club	Windows	
1998	Girl Talk	Windows	
1999	Arthur's 2nd Grade	Macintosh, Windows	
1999	Arthur's 1st Grade	Windows	
1999	Trivial Pursuit Millennium Edition	Windows	
1999	Ellie's Enchanted Garden	Windows	
1999	Nickelodeon BrainBender	Windows	
2000	Disney's Mickey Saves The Day 3D Adventure	Windows	
2000	Arthur's Preschool	Windows	
2000	Barbie: Pet Rescue	Windows	

== Presage Software ==
Presage Software (also known as Presage Software and Development Co)was a company acquired by Human Code in March 1999. It was founded in 1986 and was based in San Rafael, California.

=== Presage Software products ===
Title	Platform(s)	Ref.
Hexen: Beyond Heretic	Macintosh version	
Lode Runner Online: The Mad Monks' Revenge	Macintosh and Windows95 versions	
Lode Runner: The Legend Returns	Macintosh and Windows versions	
Prince of Persia	Macintosh version	
Star Wars Screen Entertainment	Macintosh and Windows versions	
Oh No! More Lemmings	Macintosh version	
Lemmings	Macintosh version	
Flashback	Macintosh version	
RoboSport	Windows version	
The Even More Incredible Machine	Macintosh and Windows versions	
BreakThru!	Macintosh version	
Contraption Zack	MS-DOS and Amiga versions	
Grand Slam Bridge II	Windows version	
The Incredible Toon Machine	Macintosh and Windows versions	
Jonny Quest: Curse of the Mayan Warriors	MS-DOS version	
Might and Magic III: Isles of Terra	Macintosh version	
Solitaire Deluxe	Windows95 version	
Spaceward Ho!	Windows and MS-DOS versions	
Take a Break! Crosswords	Macintosh version	
Vegas Games Entertainment Pack	Macintosh version	
World of Xeen	Macintosh version	
Drawing Discoveries	Macintosh, Windows, and Windows95 versions	
Chess Mates	Macintosh, Windows and Windows95 versions	
Menlo the Frog	Macintosh, Windows, and Windows95 versions	
Mario Teaches Typing	Macintosh version	
Mario's Fundamentals	Macintosh, Windows, and MS-DOS versions	
The Backyard	Macintosh, Windows, and MS-DOS versions	
Read, Write & Type	Macintosh and Windows versions	
Dvorak on Typing	Windows version	
The Playroom	Macintosh, Windows, and Windows95 versions	
Zurk's Learning Safari	Macintosh and MS-DOS versions	
Madeline 1st and 2nd Grade Reading	Macintosh, Windows98, and Windows95 versions	
Learn to Program BASIC	Macintosh and Windows95 versions	
Kid Pix	Contributed Programming to the Macintosh, Windows and Windows95 versions	
Star Control 3	Macintosh conversion	
Rockett's Tricky Decision	Macintosh, Windows, and Windows95 versions	
Rockett's New School	Macintosh, Windows, and Windows95 versions	
Shanghai: Dynasty	Contributed Art + Audio to the Macintosh and Windows95 versions	
Lode Runner	Ported LodeRunner 1.5 to the Playstation	
Lode Runner 2	Windows95 and Macintosh versions	
