= Karate Kommandos =

1986 animated television mini-series

- Created by: Chuck Norris
- Developed by: Dan DiStefano
- Directed by: Charles A. Nichols; John Kimball
- Starring: Chuck Norris
- Voices of: Sam Fontana; Kathy Garver; Robert Ito; Mona Marshall; Bill Martin; Alan Oppenheimer; Keone Young
- Composer: Udi Harpaz
- Country of origin: United States
- Original language: English
- No. of seasons: 1
- No. of episodes: 5

Production
- Executive producers: Joe Ruby; Ken Spears
- Producer: Larry Huber
- Running time: 30 minutes
- Production company: Ruby-Spears Enterprises

Original release
- Network: First-run syndication
- Release: September 15 – September 19, 1986

Related
- Lazer Tag Academy

Karate Kommandos (also known as Chuck Norris: Karate Kommandos) is an American animated series that originally aired in 1986 as a syndicated five episode miniseries. It was created by and starred Chuck Norris as himself, and produced by Ruby-Spears Enterprises. Re-runs of the cartoon have occasionally aired on Boomerang and Adult Swim.

== Plot ==
"Narrator: Chuck Norris! Chuck Norris, man of action! [GONG!] Chuck Norris stars in Chuck Norris: Karate Kommandos! Chuck Norris, he's got nerves of steel and strength to match! Chuck Norris, with his team: Pepper! [Pepper: It's too dangerous, Chuck!] [Too Much: Wow!] Narrator: Too much! [Too Much: Too much!] Narrator: Kimo, the samurai warrior! Reed, Chuck's teenage apprentice, Tabe, the sumo champion! With Chuck Norris, they battle the sinister forces of the Claw! [Claw: Remember this!] and the ruthless Super-Ninja! [Super-Ninja: Wha- I'll finish Norris!] Chuck Norris stars in Chuck Norris: Karate Kommandos!

— Opening narration.

This fictionalized version of Chuck Norris is a United States government operative with a team of racially diverse warriors known as the Karate Kommandos. Together, they fight against the organization VULTURE led by the Claw and his right-hand man Super Ninja.

== Production ==
The series follows the framing device of Mister T (also a Ruby-Spears production). At the beginning of each episode, a live action segment with Norris, usually at a gym or a martial arts studio, is shown to explain what is going on. At the end of each episode, Norris narrates a moral lesson for the audience to learn.

== Characters ==
=== Karate Kommandos ===
The team includes:

- Chuck Norris (voiced by himself) is the leader of the Karate Kommandos.
- Pepper (voiced by Kathy Garver) is a technology expert and mechanic.
- Reed (voiced by Sam Fontana) is Chuck's young apprentice and Pepper's brother.
- Kimo (voiced by Alan Oppenheimer) is a samurai warrior.
- Tabe (voiced by Robert Ito) is a sumo champion.
- Too Much (voiced by Mona Marshall) is Chuck's young ward.

=== VULTURE ===
VULTURE is an evil organization that plots to take over the world. Its members include:

- Claw (voiced by Bill Martin) is the leader of VULTURE who serves as the primary antagonist of the series. Claw has a metal claw for a right arm which he often shows when quoting to his operatives on their assignments to "Remember this".
- Super-Ninja (voiced by Keone Young) is a ninja who is Claw's right-hand man.
- VULTURE Ninjas are the foot soldiers of VULTURE.

== Episodes ==
No.	Title	Written by	Original release date
1	"Deadly Dolphin"	Dan DiStefano; Janis Diamond	September 15, 1986
Chuck Norris and his comrades are helping a scientist named Dr. Sanford test experimental equipment that would enable people to breathe underwater by converting water into oxygen. The Claw sends Super-Ninja and a female VULTURE operative named Angelfish to lead his men to kidnap Dr. Sanford and break into Sealab. It is up to Norris' team to defend them both.
2	"Target: Chuck Norris"	Jack Bornoff	September 16, 1986
The Claw places a bounty on Chuck Norris' head in order to eliminate him once and for all. At the same time, he sends the Imposter to steal a computer chip that would permit him to gain control of NATO's defenses. Chuck Norris and his comrades must get the chip back in order to protect the free world. When Super-Ninja manages to capture Too-Much, Chuck Norris must rescue his young ward as well.
3	"Terror Train"	Matt Uitz	September 17, 1986
Chuck Norris and his comrades are assigned to guard a robot laser while it is being transported, but The Claw has his eyes on the prize as well so he sends some of his best men to steal it. When Super-Ninja plants some explosives onto the transport train, however, Norris must play his cards correctly or risk losing the lives of the passengers on board.
4	"Menace from Space"	Mike Chain	September 18, 1986
Chuck Norris and his comrades head off to a space shuttle launch site in order to warn a general about The Claw's plans. They are too late and The Claw manages to get away with the shuttle. To make matters worse, the space shuttle was carrying a fusion cannon that has the power to do unspeakable damage to any city in the world. Norris decides to use an old space shuttle to go into space and stop Super Ninja before any damage is dealt.
5	"Island of the Walking Dead"	Janis Diamond	September 19, 1986
The Claw is attempting to bring down a United States satellite in order to reprogram it so he can gain control of all the nation's military bases, so the President decides to send Chuck Norris to stop him. Super Ninja, however, manages to distract Norris long enough for The Claw's men to succeed. Norris and his comrades head off to Voodoo Island in hope of recovering the satellite, but things take a turn for the worse, and they discover that the island is full of the walking dead.

== Home media ==
In 1987, a VHS tape of Chuck Norris: Karate Kommandos was released by Worldvision Home Video.

The complete series was released on DVD in April 2011, via Warner Archive line.

== Comic book ==
A comic book based on the series was published by Star Comics, an imprint of Marvel Comics which produced comic books aimed at young children. Steve Ditko provided the art. The series ran four issues from January through July 1987.

Issue #1 found Too-Much daydreaming in class about being as great a martial artist as Chuck Norris, even taking down the Super Ninja singlehandedly. Without warning, Too-Much's teacher calls on him to give his book report (which he characteristically has not even started) on James Clavell's The Children's Story. Then Too-Much, his classmates, and their teacher are taken hostage by the Klaw's ninjas, who demand the Super-cruiser in return for their release. The Super-cruiser, which looks like a U-Haul truck, is a new anti-terrorist weapon created by Norris for the government. Pepper drives the Super-cruiser to the school, where she and her trusty dog take on the ninjas, while Chuck himself barges into the classroom and knocks out more of the ninjas. One of the ninjas tries to shoot Norris, who stops the bullet with a copy of The Children's Story; he then sells Too-Much a bill of goods about what a great book this is, while the police haul the ninjas off to jail.

Issue #2 has Norris looking into a possible conspiracy to steal the new Banana 7000 prototype by going to a seedy seaside bar and asking too many questions. Kimo, Tabe, Pepper and Reed are guarding the newest prototype at a hotel but the Cult of the Klaw get the drop on Pepper, kidnap her and steal it while Kimo and Tabe are taking a break. Reed is distracted by Margie, a stranger whose mother is ill and is convinced by The Cult of the Klaw to help steal the computer for money for her mother's operation. The Karate Kommandos, now joined by Too Much and Wolf, return to find the hotel empty. They change into their battle suits and begin to search for Pepper. Meanwhile Pepper is being forced to show The Klaw's ninjas how to use the computer. Margie does not want anyone to be hurt so turns on them by making a plan with Pepper to escape. The Kommandos arrive at the enemies bungalow and enter politely according to Kimo. They take out the ninjas inside but as a last ditch effort, their leader attempts to threaten Pepper but when he enters Pepper's room, Margie takes him out with a vase. There was a big reward for anyone who helps apprehend the thieves who were after the computer and Norris believes Margie earned it. She is so grateful to be able pay for her mother's operation she rewards Reed with a kiss.

== Action figures ==
To coincide with the airing of the show, Kenner Products made a set of action figures based on the main characters of the show. Kenner also made many accessories, including weapons and vehicles, to go along with the figurines.

== In popular culture ==
- The show is parodied in the 2012 CGI series version of Teenage Mutant Ninja Turtles via a fictional cartoon show named Chris Bradford's 2 Ruff Krew, starring and produced by Chris Bradford, himself a parody of Chuck Norris. This fictional series is first featured in the 4th-season episode "The Weird World of Wyrm".

== Stations ==
City	Station
Boston	WLVI 56
