= More Vegas Games =

- Developer: The Dreamers Guild
- Publisher: New World Computing
- Designer: Joe Pierce
- Platform: Windows
- Release: 1993

More Vegas Games is a 1993 video game developed by Chatsworth, California-based studio The Dreamers Guild and published by New World Computing.

== Gameplay ==
The game presents a collection of casino activities in which the player selects from options such as blackjack, baccarat, craps, video poker, and horse racing. In blackjack, the player places bets, receives cards, and chooses actions like continuing to the next hand. Baccarat offers betting on the player, dealer, or a tie before cards are revealed. The horse‑racing mode displays a track with multiple horses, allowing the player to wager on outcomes before the race begins. Each game provides its own interface for placing bets, viewing results, and progressing through successive rounds.

== Reception ==
Reception

Review scores
Publication	Score
Computer Game Review	76%
Electronic Games	85%

Electronic Games called More Vegas Games a great alternative to Windows Solitare. Computer Game Review gave More Vegas Games an overall score of 76%.

== Other versions/Games ==
=== Vegas Games Entertainment Pack ===
Presage Software developed the Macintosh version of Vegas Games Entertainment Pack. AllGame gave a rating of 2.5 out of 5 to the Windows version and said it's "an adequate translation of the six casino games but it doesn't contain any of the charm of the real experience in Las Vegas."

=== Vegas Game Deluxe ===
Vegas Game Deluxe was released by New World Computing in 1994. The Age gave Vegas Game Deluxe a score of 3 out of 5. Hyper recommended Vegas Game Deluxe to people who don't have gambling machines.
