= Trivial Pursuit Millennium Edition =

Trivial Pursuit: Millennium Edition
- Developer: Human Code
- Publisher: Hasbro Interactive
- Platform: Windows
- Release: October 4, 1999
- Genres: Digital tabletop, quiz

Trivial Pursuit Millennium Edition is a 1999 video game developed by Human Code and published by Hasbro Interactive.

== Gameplay ==
The player chooses among Classic Pursuit, Party Pursuit, or Point Pursuit to answer 2,000 non‑repeating questions—sometimes with multimedia—and respond by selecting multiple‑choice options or typing answers.

== Reception ==
Reception

Review scores
Publication	Score
FamilyPC	87%
PC Player	62%
PC Action	67%

Games Domain called Trivial Pursuit Millennium Edition a "decent $20 purchase for any trivia buff". FamilyPC found Trivial Pursuit Millennium Edition to be a "definite improvement over its cardboard cousin".
