= Drawing Discoveries =

1997 video game

- Developer: Presage Software
- Publisher: Brainstorm
- Platforms: Windows; Macintosh
- Release: 1996
- Genre: Home

Drawing Discoveries is a 1996 video game from Brainstorm. The game teaches about animals as well as drawing and is for ages 3 and up.

== Gameplay ==
Drawing Discoveries is an interactive program designed to teach children how to draw while introducing them to the geography and culture of Africa. Through fifteen half-hour, step-by-step drawing lessons, kids learn how to sketch animals and people from three different African regions. The experience is enhanced with QuickTime movies, Swahili language, and a guide to different drawing styles and terminology.

== Development ==
Drawing Discoveries was developed by Presage Software, a company founded in 1986. It was released for Windows and Macintosh platforms.

== Reception ==
Birmingham Post-Herald said "This has a very different feel to it from other art programs we've tried. I think it could definitely help a beginner learn a few basic drawing techniques". The Oregonian gave Drawing Discoveries a good rating.
