= The Cartoon History of the Universe (video game) =

1994 video game

- Developer: Human Code
- Publisher: Putnam New Media
- Platform: Windows
- Release: 1994
- Genre: Educational

The Cartoon History of the Universe is a 1994 video game from Human Code. It is based on The Cartoon History of the Universe comic book series.

== Gameplay ==
The Cartoon History of the Universe presents its material through an interactive format tied to the comic series. Players navigate historical topics by engaging with animated sequences and informational segments that illustrate events and concepts from the past. The structure guides the user through different eras, using visual storytelling and interactive elements to convey historical developments as they progress.

== Development ==
The Cartoon History of the Universe was developed by Human Code, a company founded in 1993.

== Reception ==
Reception

Review scores
Publication	Score
Electronic Games	A-
Electronic Entertainment	4/5

Los Angeles Times said "Perhaps the best thing about these discs is that while enjoying them, you actually learn (or are reminded of) fascinating sequences in history".

Wired said "But the best thing that could happen to this disc is to get it banned from boring classrooms by professors who don't know a revolution when it hits them".

The game won four 1995 NewMedia Invision Awards.
