= Geobee Challenge =

- Developer: Human Code
- Publisher: Mindscape
- Platforms: Windows; Macintosh
- Release: 1997

Geobee Challenge is a 1997 video game developed by Human Code and published by Mindscape. It was described as You Don’t Know Jack meets the Geographic.

== Gameplay ==
The player selects one of nine animated icons and participates in a trivia‑style game hosted by the unseen Reginald, with Buzzbee appearing on screen to present additional question types such as identifying which picture was taken in a specific location or determining which item does not belong. The player answers challenging geography‑focused questions drawn from a large pool, with the chosen icon reacting happily or sadly based on correct or incorrect responses.

== Development ==
In September 1996, National Geographic Interactive and Mindscape announced a $40 million partnership to launch a new line of software in at least four languages. Five titles were scheduled to release in 1997.

== Reception ==
Reception

Review scores
Publication	Score
All Game Guide	2.5/5
Syracuse Herald-Journal	4/5
The Times	3/10

All Game Guide called Geobee Challenge a game suited only for younger teens. Syracuse Herald-Journal liked the variety of puzzles but disliked the humorous sound effects.
