= Menlo the Frog =

1996 video game

- Developers: Presage Software; Windy Hill Software
- Publisher: Windy Hill Software
- Platforms: Windows; Macintosh
- Release: January 1996 (retail version)

Menlo the Frog, also known as Menlo the Frog -- A Musical Fairy Tale, is a 1996 video game from Windy Hill Software. The game is a self-described musical fairy tale that takes young children on an adventure in which they learn musical skills, the value of exploration, critical thinking and some simple arithmetic. It is for ages 3 to 7.

== Gameplay ==
Menlo the Frog — A Musical Fairy Tale takes children on a journey through an animated world, blending traditional storytelling with interactive musical learning. The story follows Menlo the Frog and Princess Winnicent as they confront the King of Later, who has stolen the key to music. To restore harmony to their land, players guide the characters across whimsical realms — from serene underwater paradises to eerie castles and swamps — engaging in musical challenges and moral quests along the way.

Gameplay balances structured narrative progression with open-ended exploration. Kids can follow the story linearly or dive into various activities using a clickable "map of the realm," which also doubles as a pause-and-return feature. The game's interface encourages replayability through diverse mini-games:

- High/Low Singing Clams: Helps children recognize pitch by interacting with sea creatures offering spelling, reading, and counting guidance.
- CanBe Critter Bridge: Lets players compose melodies using animal placement, adjusting instrumentation and tempo, with a grumpy troll managing resets.
- Beat and Rhythm Rainbow: Teaches rhythm by encouraging kids to tap in time with music via the space bar.

Advanced animation tools and sound design mimic classic cartoons, with lip synchronization and immersive audio layering.

== Development ==
Menlo the Frog was developed by Windy Hill Productions, a company based in Menlo Park, California. Presage Software helped develop the game. Ed Bogas composed the theme music, score, and lyrics for the game.

== Reception ==
Reception

Review scores
Publication	Score
Evansville Courier and Press	4/4
The Boston Globe	5/5

Evansville Courier and Press gave the game a rating of 4 out of 4, saying "Simply put, Menlo the Frog is the best children's music program we've ever seen".

Menlo the Frog was named one of the top 100 CD-ROMs by PC Magazine.
