= The Backyard (video game) =

1993 video game

- Developer: Presage Software
- Publisher: Broderbund
- Designers: Leslie Grimm; Lynn Kirkpatrick
- Composers: Bob Marshall; Jonelle Adkisson; Tom Rettig
- Series: Early Learning Family
- Platforms: MS-DOS, Macintosh
- Release: 1993
- Genre: Educational
- Mode: Single-player

The Backyard is a video game created by Broderbund in 1993 for MS-DOS and Macintosh. It is a sequel to its predecessor The Playroom and the third game of the "Early Learning Family" series. It was designed for ages 3 to 6 (preschool through first grade).

== Gameplay ==
The Backyard contains six games including "Scarecrow Faces", "Pumpkin Patch", "Sandbox Treasure", "Animal Habitat", "Knothole" and "Animal Cookies" as well as other minor activities to teach players about creativity, map reading, numbers and animals. The game introduces Pepper Mouse's sister Ginger. She also appears in the 1995 remake of The Playroom.
