= Obscure II =

2007 video game

- Developer: Hydravision Entertainment
- Publishers: NA: Ignition Entertainment; PAL: Playlogic Entertainment
- Designer: Benjamin Ortiz
- Composer: Olivier Deriviere
- Engine: RenderWare
- Platforms: Microsoft Windows; PlayStation 2 Wii; PlayStation Portable
- Release: Windows, PlayStation 2 & Wii: EU: September 7, 2007; NA: March 25, 2008; AU: June 12, 2008 (PC, PS2); EU: August 28, 2008 (Wii); PlayStation Portable: NA: September 30, 2009 (PSP Store); EU: October 9, 2009; NA: October 13, 2009; AU: October 22, 2009
- Genre: Survival horror
- Modes: Single-player, multiplayer

Obscure II (stylized as ObsCure II), known in North America as Obscure: The Aftermath, is a survival horror video game developed by Hydravision Entertainment and published by Playlogic in PAL regions and Ignition in North America for Microsoft Windows, PlayStation 2 and Wii. It is the sequel to the 2004 video game Obscure. A PlayStation Portable version was released in 2009. The game was later released on Steam in 2014.

== Gameplay ==
Obscure II is a co-op survival horror game. The gameplay consists of exploration, puzzle solving, item collection, and battles. Each character has a particular skill, such as moving heavy objects or acrobatic abilities. Players choose two characters (of six playable options) to guide through narrow, enemy-ridden environments. The game may be played alone; to do so, the player switches control between the two characters as needed.

== Synopsis ==
=== Characters ===
- Shannon Matthews

Born in Riverside, California (voiced by E. Renee Thomas) - Kenny's younger sister. Her experiences have left her with a much darker personality. Due to the experiments done to her by Friedman she has the ability to control black auras and suck them into herself. Shannon succeeded at adapting to the experiments and does not have to take medication to cope with them.

- Stanley Jones

Born in New York City (voiced by Joshua Swanson) - After the events at Leafmore, Stan is proposed a large amount of money to break into a place, using his abilities as a master lockpicker, but the police caught them and ended up being sent to prison. He wanted to never go back to school, and ended up working as a delivery truck driver. He needs medication to cope with the experiments.

- Kenny Matthews

Born in Riverside, California (voiced by Buster Cox) - Shannon's older brother. After the events at Leafmore, he went to Fallcreek University with his sister. He needs medication to cope with the experiments.

=== New player characters ===
- Corey Wilde

Born in Austin, Texas (voiced by Buster Cox) - Corey is a car enthusiast and a skater who seems resistant to pain. His girlfriend is Mei and he loves her immensely, yet because of his immature nature he has a hard time convincing her.

- Mei Wang

Born in New York City (voiced by Alicia LaForce) - Jun's twin sister. She is obsessed with video games and has become very skilled at hacking.

- Jun Wang

Born in New York City (voiced by Nikki Rapp) - She is a gamer. All the guys dream about her.

- Sven Hansen

Born in Oslo (Norway) (voiced by Lawrence Bailey) - Sven was born in Norway, but migrated to the U.S. as a baby. He is fanatical about his birth nation and hockey. He not-so-secretly loves Amy.

- Amy Brookes

Born in Charlotte, North Carolina (voiced by Amy Sanchez) - A young, smart, blonde girl who exploits her good looks and is quick to tease just for the fun of it. She is aware that both Sven and Kenny are interested in her, and she appears to be interested in them. She not-so-secretly has a crush on Sven.

=== Plot ===
The story is set two years after the "Leafmore Incident" (the events of the first Obscure); the Leafmore incident has been somehow covered-up. Shannon and Kenny are now enrolled in the nearby Fallcreek University, while Stan is reforming his life as a delivery truck driver. Stan and Kenny have to take medication to prevent the effects of the plant from infecting their bodies, while Shannon has been able to adapt to the changes.

As the story begins, a new drug created from a strange flower is quickly spreading its influence over the University's populace. Soon enough, a small group of students, along with the Leafmore High survivors have to face a horde of mutants and try to stay alive.

The spores spread through the whole city and later the whole country. The outbreak starts in a fraternity party of the ΔΘГ brotherhood. Amy and Kenny are the first ones to arrive, only to find the place infected when they get inside. The students then meet a scientist, Richard James, who is the biology teacher of the university, who aids the player several times. After some time, the group is joined by Corey and Mei who try to escape.

Once outside, Sven is almost run over by someone driving Corey's car so Corey and Amy chase the car thief into the woods. Meanwhile, Mei, who gets a call from her twin sister Jun, goes with Sven to rescue her, but fails as Jun is killed by a monster.

The duo finds Corey's car, however its owner gets angry and, along with Amy, kills the now mutated thief. After some more walking they notice a disfigured man, fight some new monsters (Harpies) and walk through the forest to eventually end up in the "Fallcreek University Hospital", where they find Shannon and her brother Kenny, the latter of whom is badly ill due to sniffing the drug made by the black spore flower. He can't find his medicine and eventually succumbs, turning into a monster.

Then the whole group reunites in the hospital's east ground floor, where they make a chemical dynamite to destroy a wall and get to the parking lot. Sven and Corey help everyone to get into a warehouse, but they are surprised by a monstrous Kenny who throws Corey into a pole and kills Mei, greatly distressing Corey. Stan, having responded to Kenny's call before mutating, meets with the surviving group and drives them away, until he crashes off and falls into a dam. Shannon and Stan explore the Dam and the whole group finally reunites to find Amy in a corner of the room.

After locating Amy they find that this was as a result of Kenny's actions, who implied that he raped her. The group escapes, but Corey and Shannon stay and defeat him by making him fall into a pit with a giant metal apparatus falling onto him.

As the game progresses, Stan and Shannon eventually get closer. Whilst they find a place to take refuge, Amy and Sven explore and are ambushed by a man with a disfigured face carrying a chainsaw. He fights Sven to allow Amy to escape.

When they find Sven impaled on a meat hook by the disfigured man at an abandoned house, Stan and Shannon chase after the disfigured man, leading to the ruins of the school from the first game and a tree with huge moving branches. The huge tree was actually the mutated remains of Leonard Friedman (from Obscure) whilst the disfigured man is his son, Jedidiah. Friedman had injected himself with a strain of virus that mutated him which was then passed on to Jedidiah. Stan and Corey kill the Friedman tree, while Corey finishes off Jedidiah, avenging Sven's death.

When the pair return, they find Richard and an ambulance carrying a pregnant Amy. Stan and Corey find out that the fraternity, Delta Theta Gamma, is not just a normal college fraternity but an ancient and powerful organization that wants to harness the power of the Mortifilla. The ambulance takes Stan, Shannon, Amy, and Corey away, but they crash at a bridge after going through a cloud of spores. Stan and Shannon try to find out where Richard's new pick up point is and try to reach it, whilst Corey goes to rescue Amy. On their way, they stump upon the museum of the Delta Theta Gamma within Fallcreek and discover that they are responsible for covering up the Leaftmore incident and involve in the Fredman's experiment with the Mortifilla. They also discover that Josh and Ashley, their friends from Leaftmore had been killed by Jedidiah after investigating the abandoned house where Jedidiah lives.

Corey arrives first to see Richard taking off with Amy in a helicopter. But the ride is stopped by a yet living and more powerful Monster Kenny, Corey decides to fight Kenny, but the fight doesn't last as Kenny manages to infect Corey.

When Shannon and Stan reach the new destination point they see Corey, just as he is infected prior to the entry of Stan and Shannon, on his knees. He states that Mei was the only one he cared about, then commits suicide. Stan and Shannon kill Kenny by crushing him with a huge platform of lights over the football pitch.

As Kenny lies dying under the platform he pleads to Shannon to take care of his child, however Shannon swears that she will not let it live. The helicopter containing Amy and Richard fills up with a cloud of spores before it explodes. Stan asks Shannon what to do next; she replies that she will continue on and cut all family ties as well as stopping the Delta Theta Gamma organization.

== Development ==
Hydravision began development of Obscure II shortly after Obscure released. Gameplay was designed with cooperative play in mind, particularly puzzle solving and weapon design. Hydravision aimed to ensure the game's horror would translate in both single-player and co-op play.

In keeping with its predecessor, Obscure II took inspiration from American teen's life and popular teen horror films. These movies had humorous and campy elements, which translated to similar moments in the game. However, Obscure II sought to evoke a darker, more mature atmosphere than the original.

== Release and promotion ==
The game was released for Windows and PlayStation 2 in Europe on September 7, 2007, in North America on March 25, 2008 and in Australasia on June 12. It was released for the Wii in North America on March 25, 2008 and in Europe on August 28. A PlayStation Portable version was released in October 2009.

== Reception ==
Reception

Aggregate score
Aggregator	Score			
Aggregator	PC	PS2	PSP	Wii
Metacritic	59/100	60/100	66/100	53/100

Review scores
Publication	Score			
Publication	PC	PS2	PSP	Wii
Eurogamer	N/A	6/10	N/A	N/A
Game Informer	N/A	N/A	N/A	3/10
GameRevolution	N/A	C+	N/A	N/A
GameSpot	N/A	N/A	6/10	4.5/10
GameSpy	N/A	N/A	N/A	1.5/5
GameTrailers	N/A	N/A	N/A	4.7/10
GameZone	N/A	7.7/10	7/10	6.5/10
IGN	(UK) 7.5/10 (US) 6.3/10	7.5/10	6/10	7/10
Nintendo Power	N/A	N/A	N/A	7/10
PC Gamer (US)	52%	N/A	N/A	N/A
PlayStation: The Official Magazine	N/A	2.5/5	3/5	N/A

The game received "mixed or average reviews" on all platforms according to the review aggregation website Metacritic. IGN praised the U.S. PlayStation 2 version's graphics, saying that it has "detailed, atmospheric environments and respectable character models", but criticized said console version for its "pretty cheap cutscenes" and "lacking plot."
