= Ellie's Enchanted Garden =

- Developer: Human Code
- Publisher: Zowie Intertainment
- Platform: Windows
- Release: September 1999
- Genre: Educational

Ellie's Enchanted Garden, also known as Ellie's Enchanted Garden: A Smart Toy Playset, is a 1999 toys-to-life video game developed by Human Code and published by Zowie Intertainment. It was released in September 1999.

== Gameplay ==
The gameplay centers on a plastic garden playset connected to the computer, where the player launches the software via CD‑ROM and then controls onscreen activity by physically moving characters, gates, and other objects in the garden; when the player wiggles a character such as Ellie, Bingo, or Lilly, the corresponding figure on the screen performs actions like dancing, playing hopscotch, jumping rope, or playing hide‑and‑seek, and the experience consists of changing backgrounds and manipulating the toy's movable parts to trigger simple interactive responses on the monitor.

== Reception ==
Reception

Review scores
Publication	Score
Discovery School	8/10
FamilyPC	80%

SuperKids called Ellie's Enchanted Garden an attractive as a down-time activity. Tampa Bay Times found Ellie's Enchanted Garden to be a program a child will not be bored of for a while.
