= Long Live the Royals =

American animated miniseries

- Poster depicting the family; from left to right: Rosalind, Rufus, Eleanor, Peter, and Alex (bottom)
- Created by: Sean Szeles
- Story by: Shion Takeuchi; Sean Szeles
- Directed by: Sean Szeles
- Voices of: Jon Daly; Wendi McLendon-Covey; Gillian Jacobs; Kieran Culkin; Nicki Rapp; Horatio Sanz; Peter Serafinowicz
- Narrated by: Peter Serafinowicz (Intro)
- Theme music composer: Scot Stafford; Sean Szeles
- Opening theme: "Long Live the Royals Theme"
- Composer: Scot Stafford
- Country of origin: United States
- Original language: English
- No. of episodes: 4 (+ Pilot)

Production
- Executive producers: Sean Szeles; Curtis Lelash; Jennifer Pelphrey; Brian A. Miller; Rob Sorcher
- Producer: Ryan Slater
- Running time: Pilot: 9 minutes; Miniseries: 11 minutes
- Production company: Cartoon Network Studios

Original release
- Network: Cartoon Network
- Release: November 30 – December 3, 2015

Long Live the Royals is an American animated television miniseries created by Sean Szeles. The miniseries, which aired from November 30 to December 3, 2015, on Cartoon Network, consists of four episodes, each following a member of a fictional British royal family as they celebrate the annual Yule Hare Festival.

== Plot ==
Set in a contemporary world in a medieval kingdom, Long Live the Royals follows a fictional British royal family—King Rufus and Queen Eleanor and their children Peter, Rosalind, and Alex—as they honor the annual Yule Hare Festival. The family must battle having to rule their kingdom while maintaining a normal family at the same time. Meanwhile, the festival continues with the parties and feasts that comprise it.

== Production ==
Long Live the Royals was created by Sean Szeles. The miniseries, announced in February 2015, is a production from Cartoon Network Studios. It is the third miniseries to air on Cartoon Network, following Over the Garden Wall a year earlier, in November 2014, and Stakes earlier in the month, in November 2015. The miniseries was adapted from a pilot released online in May 2014. Developed by Szeles in collaboration with the studios' developmental program for animated series, the pilot won him an Emmy Award at the sixty-sixth annual Primetime Creative Arts ceremony. Preceding the nomination, Szeles had worked as a supervising producer on Regular Show, another Cartoon Network production.

Four episodes of the show were produced, each lasting eleven minutes; they are set at night and follow a different character individually. Michael Ouweleen, the chief marketing officer for Cartoon Network, explained that the miniseries format allows for different artistic qualities to flourish in their shorts program and for existing pilots put on hold to come to fruition. A number of comedians were hired as the voices of primary and secondary characters. Jon Daly, Wendi McLendon-Covey, Gillian Jacobs and Nicki Rapp reprised their roles from the pilot as King Rufus, Queen Eleanor, Rosalind and Alex respectively, whilst Kieran Culkin took over from Jeremy Redleaf as the voice of Peter. Additional characters were voiced by Fred Armisen, Ellie Kemper, Ken Marino, Alfred Molina, Horatio Sanz, and Peter Serafinowicz.

== Cast ==
=== Main voices ===
- Jon Daly – King Rufus
- Wendi McLendon-Covey – Queen Eleanor
- Jane Horrocks – Queen Eleanor (UK Version, miniseries only)
- Gillian Jacobs – Rosalind
- Kieran Culkin – Peter
- Nicki Rapp – Alex
- Horatio Sanz – Allistair
- Peter Serafinowicz – Frederick, Announcer

=== Various voices ===
- Nonso Anozie – Demonic Hare, Gregor
- Fred Armisen – Gavin, Brody
- Julian Barratt – Harold the Guard, Ace
- Wendi McLendon-Covey – Danny
- Kieran Culkin –
- Jon Daly – Bystander, Knight #3, Ashley
- Jermaine Fowler – Demarcus
- Gillian Jacobs – Katherine, Kimber
- Ellie Kemper – Mudria Dirtman
- Ken Marino – Snake
- Alfred Molina – Rupert, Neil
- Jordi Mollà – King Diego Belafonte
- Nicki Rapp –
- Jeremy Redleaf – Peter (Pilot only)
- Horatio Sanz – Knight #1, Gorgeous, Mr. Dirtman
- Christopher Corey Smith – Frederick/Announcer (Pilot only), Knight #2
- Peter Serafinowicz – Demonic Hare

== Episodes ==
Series	Episodes	Originally released	
Series	Episodes	First released	Last released
Pilot		16 May 2014	
Miniseries	4	November 30, 2015	December 3, 2015

=== Pilot (2014) ===
No.	Title	Directed by	Written and storyboarded by	Original release date
0	"Long Live the Royals"	Phil Rynda (creative), Sue Mondt (art), and Robert Alvarez (timing)	Sean Szeles	May 2, 2016 (TV)
Peter enters his father King Rufus' Tournament of Games to capture the attention of a woman named Katherine.

=== Miniseries (2015) ===
No.	Title	Written and storyboarded by	Original release date	U.S. viewers (millions)
1	"Yule Scare"	Cole Sanchez and Sean Szeles	November 30, 2015	1.04
The family begins planning for the festival, but those preparations fall apart when Peter is unsuccessful in finding friends to party with.
2	"Punk Show"	Sean Szeles	December 1, 2015	0.95
Rosalind attempts skipping the festival in favor of her boyfriend's punk rock concert, much to the chagrin of King Rufus.
3	"Snore Much"	Cole Sanchez and Sean Szeles	December 2, 2015	0.96
Queen Eleanor must resolve her snoring when it brings about issues in the kingdom.
4	"The Feast"	Calvin Wong	December 3, 2015	0.85
As the feast of the festival commences, Alex escapes to retrieve the Yule Hare of Lore.

== Broadcast ==
Long Live the Royals premiered on Cartoon Network channels in Africa on December 19, 2015 and in Australia and New Zealand on January 26, 2016. Long Live The Royals premiered on Cartoon Network UK and Ireland on September 6, 2016.
