= Jonny Quest: Curse of the Mayan Warriors =

1993 video game

- Developer: Presage Software
- Publisher: Hollyware Entertainment
- Platform: MS-DOS
- Release: 1993
- Genre: Action

Jonny Quest: Curse of the Mayan Warriors is an action video game for MS-DOS developed by American studio Presage Software and published in 1993 by Hollyware Entertainment. The game is based on the TV series The Adventures of Jonny Quest.

== Gameplay ==
Jonny Quest: Curse of the Mayan Warriors features the young adventurer Jonny Quest alongside his adopted brother Hadji and their dog Bandit. The narrative centers on Jonny's mission to uncover five lost treasures of the Mayan civilization, prompted by a mysterious looting operation in Guatemala. His father, a renowned scientist, is enlisted by the government, setting the stage for Jonny's jungle expedition. Gameplay blends exploration, puzzle-solving, and combat. Players navigate through dense jungle and ancient temples, collecting useful items and engaging in basic dialogue with locals, which occasionally leads to side quests. If Jonny is captured, Bandit aids in escape, utilizing a simple inventory system that allows item interaction.

== Development ==
The game was developed by Presage Software, a company founded in 1986.

== Reception ==
Reception

Review scores
Publication	Score
Computer and Video Games	25%
PC Zone	12/100
PC Joker	49%
PC Review	3/10

PC Review said "On the positive side, the beat ‘em up and submission elements provide a little variety from the exploration, and some of the puzzles will stretch your imagination. However, if you're looking for an innovative, gripping arcade adventure with plenty of depth, this isn't it"
