= All of Your Toys =

Song by The Monkees

from the album Missing Links
- Released: July 1987
- Recorded: 1967
- Genre: Pop rock
- Label: Rhino
- Songwriter: Bill Martin

"All of Your Toys" is a song by The Monkees, recorded in 1967 but not released until 20 years later. The song was written by Bill Martin, a friend of The Monkees' Michael Nesmith. "All of Your Toys" was the first Monkees recording to feature all four members performing on the track.

== History ==
The Monkees hoped to make "All of Your Toys" their third single, and the first to feature them actually playing the accompaniment music, which they had not done for their first two singles (and subsequent albums). Chip Douglas, brought in by Nesmith to work with the Monkees, produced a session in January 1967, with Nesmith's friend John London on bass guitar, Nesmith on lead guitar, Peter Tork on harpsichord, Micky Dolenz on lead vocals and drums and Davy Jones on percussion. (During the same sessions, the band also re-recorded Nesmith's "The Girl I Knew Somewhere", which he had produced earlier.)

When it came to the song's release, however, two obstacles arose. One was Monkees' music supervisor Don Kirshner, who was more interested in making sure-fire hits than supporting the band's attempt to innovate. The other problem was a standing rule that any songs issued by the Monkees had to be published by Screen Gems-Columbia Music. Songwriter Martin's publisher, Tickson Music, refused to sell the copyright to Screen Gems. (Martin promptly re-signed with Screen Gems for publishing.)

Ultimately, "A Little Bit Me, a Little Bit You," written by Neil Diamond, became the band's third single.

While Kirshner ultimately left the Monkees project (in a power struggle involving the band's third single and album), the publishing rule was not overcome until 1969, when Davy Jones recorded "Someday Man" by Paul Williams and Roger Nichols.

"All of Your Toys" remained unreleased until 1987, when Rhino Records included it on Missing Links, a collection of previously unreleased Monkees recordings. The song was also included as a bonus track on the 1995 and 2006 Rhino remasters of Headquarters in a slightly different mono mix, as well as the Listen to the Band and Music Box sets in a slightly different stereo mix. It is also available on the 2011 compilation Monkeemania (The Very Best of the Monkees).

In 2011, three of the Monkees reunited for a tour and included "All of Your Toys" in their set list.

== Personnel ==
- Micky Dolenz — drums, lead vocal, backing vocals
- Michael Nesmith — electric 12-string guitar, backing vocals
- John London — bass
- Davy Jones — tambourine, backing vocals
- Peter Tork — harpsichord, backing vocals

== In popular culture ==
The song is played in Supergirl Season 5, Episode 12, "Back From the Future – Part Two," representing the relationship between Toyman (Winslow Schott) and his son, Winslow "Winn" Schott Jr.
