= Girl Talk (video game) =

- Developer: Human Code
- Publisher: Hasbro Interactive
- Platform: Windows
- Release: 1998

Girl Talk is a 1998 video game developed by Human Code and published by Hasbro Interactive. It is for ages 8 and up. It is based on the board game of the same name.

== Gameplay ==
The player selects a representative character, choosing hairstyles and eye colors, and then picks a nickname from a list. Afterward, the player selects a subject area to begin. The game presents questions and mini‑games that are simple in structure, each accompanied by an explanation shown every time it is played. Additional features include a diary for personalization, a dream journal that provides meanings of dreams, and a fortuneteller that answers yes‑or‑no questions and gives brief advice. The game allows storage of only one top‑ten list at a time. Visual elements such as background graphics, animations, and a spinner that changes appearance based on the chosen subject area accompany gameplay. Up to four players can participate, though no computer‑controlled players are available.

== Reception ==
Reception

Review scores
Publication	Score
All Game Guide	4/5
The Houston Chronicle	C

Los Angeles Times called Girl Talk surprisingly fun. All Game Guide liked the gameplay and background graphics in Girl Talk.
