= Arthur's 2nd Grade =

Arthur's 2nd Grad
- Developer: Human Code
- Publisher: The Learning Company
- Platforms: Windows; Macintosh
- Release: 1999
- Genre: Educational

Arthur's 2nd Grade is a 1999 video game developed by Human Code and published by The Learning Company. An updated Arthur's 2nd Grade: 2002 Edition was released in 2001.

== Gameplay ==
The player completes twelve educational activities based on the Arthur series, helping different characters with subjects such as geography, measurement, mathematics, reading comprehension, spelling, telling time, and grammar. Activities include planning travel itineraries for Muffy's father, measuring objects with Brain, and adding or subtracting beans with D.W. The game also includes printable projects and puzzles, such as greeting card creation, storyboarding, crossword puzzles, and objective-based mazes. Arthur can provide assistance and guidance, while difficulty settings, progress reports, automatic leveling, and additional internet-based assignments support the player's progress.

== Reception ==
Discovery School called the graphics, characters, and activities in Arthur's 2nd Grade very appealing. Kids Domain recommended Arthur's 2nd Grade to Arthur fans.
