= Zurk's Learning Safari =

1993 educational video game

- Developers: Soleil Software; Presage Software (MS-DOS, Mac)
- Publisher: Soleil Software
- Platforms: MS-DOS, Windows 3.1, Classic Mac OS
- Release: 1993
- Genre: Educational
- Mode: Single-player

Zurk's Learning Safari is an educational adventure game by American studio Soleil Software released in 1993 for Mac, MS-DOS, and 16-bit Windows. It was followed by Zurk's Rainforest Lab and Zurk's Alaskan Trek as part of a larger Soleil's Whole World Learning Series. The game is for ages 2 to 5.

== Development ==
In 1992, Barbara Christiani left Addison Wesley and founded the educational software company Soleil Software with Ragni Pasturel. The studio's work included the Zurk series, and WorldWalker: Destination Australia. The game contains voice-over work in English, French, and Spanish. The game includes activities applicable to life sciences, reading, and early math skills.

== Reception ==
PC Mag thought the game was "visually breathtaking", praising its storybook atmosphere. The Washington Post deemed it a "top-notch product". The New York Times felt it was " a very nice program" from an adult's perspective. EdWeek praised Alaskan Trek for stimulating critical thinking. The Palm Beach Post felt the games best features allowed young players to create their own nature animations on the screen and assemble electronic notebooks.
