= The Playroom (1989 video game) =

- Windows cover art
- Developers: Broderbund; Presage Software (Macintosh, Windows)
- Publishers: Broderbund; Infogrames (Amiga)
- Designers: Leslie Grimm; Dennis Casewel; Lynn Kirkpatrick
- Artist: Donna Buttlaire
- Composers: Tim Larkin; Greg Rahn
- Series: Early Learning Family Series
- Platforms: Amiga, Apple II, MS-DOS, FM Towns, Mac, Windows
- Release: December 18, 1989: MS-DOS; 1989: Apple II, IIGS, Mac; 1992: Amiga; 1994: FM Towns; 1995: Mac, Windows
- Genre: Educational
- Mode: Single-player

The Playroom is an educational video game published in 1989 for MS-DOS, Apple II, and Mac. The game was compatible with the TouchWindow utility. It was ported to the Amiga and FM Towns computers in 1992 and 1994 respectively and then remade for Microsoft Windows and Macintosh in 1995. It was designed for ages 3 to 6 (preschool through first grade) manufactured by Broderbund. A follow-up game titled The Treehouse was released in 1991 and a sequel to this game, called The Backyard in 1993.

== Gameplay ==
Gameplay screenshot

The Playroom featured Pepper Mouse and is set in his playroom. Clicking on toys and areas of the playroom will activate animated surprises or open an activity. Activities include the spinner, a simple counting game with four difficulty levels; an ABC book, where objects can be placed on two different scenes; the computer, which teaches spelling and becoming familiar with the keyboard; the cuckoo clock, which shows how to tell time; the mousehole game, which is a dice-rolling game with three skill levels; and the mix-up toy, where heads, torsos and legs from various characters can be customised. The 1995 remake includes additional content to the existing activities and the presence of Pepper's sister Ginger.

== Educational goals ==
The game is designed to make younger players comfortable within their surroundings as they become absorbed in the activities, helps them get ready for school and offers them learning opportunities in a non-threatening manner. Literacy skills are not required to play it. Topics in the game include simple math, reading, time and reasoning skills. It pays great attention to detail, clearly spelling out meanings to make reading letters and words plus typing easy. There are also activities to teach telling the time, counting and using imagination. The user manual also includes fun activities to add to the enjoyment. Copies of the game also came with a stuffed toy of Pepper Mouse. Aided by this software, Children can learn and advance at their own pace and play in their own way.

== Release ==
The game was included on a twin CD pack along with "James Discovers Math".

== Reception ==
Reception

Review scores
Publication	Score
AllGame	3.5/5 (1995 version)
Computer Gaming World	4/5

Awards
Publication	Award
Award of Excellence	Technology & Learning
Seal of Approval	National Parenting Center
Codie award	Best Early Education Program
Newsweek	1996 Editor's Choice Award

The Playroom won six Early Learning Awards. Computer Gaming World gave the game four stars out of five, calling it "clever and engaging" and placed it as one of the SPA Top Hits for Home Education.

The game was reviewed in the Oppenheim Toy Portfolio Guide Book where the authors described it as "virtual reality for three- to six-year-olds" and claimed that "[t]here is real education going on behind the scenes of this creative playroom".
