= Star Wars Screen Entertainment =

- Developer: Presage Software
- Release: 1994
- Operating system: Macintosh; Windows

Star Wars Screen Entertainment (SWSE) is a screensaver software from LucasArts.

== Summary ==
Screen Entertainment includes information that never appeared in the original Star Wars film. Scenes include the Millennium Falcon's jump to hyperspace, a run down the Death Star trench, detailed character bios, a version of the "Star Wars" screenplay complete with storyboard photos. Other features include animations of characters such as the Jawas and R2-D2 are mixed in with slide shows of movie posters.

== Development ==
Star Wars Screen Entertainment was developed by Presage Software, a company founded in 1986.

== Reception ==
PC World said "At first glance, LucasArts' Star Wars Screen Entertainment looks like a cynical attempt to wring one last quart of Grade A from Lucas's main cash cow. But this inexpensive, disk-based divertissement (it's only $35.95) is a revealing compendium of behind-the-scenes technia and trivia, and will probably be of keen interest to filmmaking fanatics as well as R2D2 diehard".

Macworld said "And on that score, this collection of 14 displays based on the Star Wars movies succeeds terrifically. George Lucas junkies will spill adrenaline to see the entire screenplay and storyboards for Star Wars".
