= Sky Trip America =

1996 video game

- Developer: Human Code
- Publisher: Discovery Channel Multimedia
- Platforms: Windows; Macintosh
- Release: March 1996

Sky Trip America is a 1996 video game developed by Human Code and published by Discovery Channel Multimedia. It is for ages 9 and up.

== Gameplay ==
Sky Trip America presents a three‑dimensional environment in which the player begins in a region of the United States and can move within that region or travel to another. The player navigates photorealistic locations by clicking through the 3‑D spaces, accessing subjects tied to each area and using tools such as a camera and a personal journal to record images and notes. A guided introduction explains how to play, after which the player is free to explore the environments and interact with the various elements embedded within them. The program also contains multiple embedded games, including a ghost‑town exploration in which the player collects items, a Pony Express mail activity that encourages movement through the world, and additional tasks such as rebuilding a damaged railroad bridge before a train arrives.

== Reception ==
Reception

Review scores
Publication	Score
All Game Guide	4/5
Evansville Courier and Press	3/4

All Game Guide said "Overall, SkyTrip America presents a positive, exciting view of history--a refreshing change from the cynical approach we often see/hear being presented" Evansville Courier and Press said "Sky Trip America strikes the perfect balance between familiar faces and surprising revelations; it kept the youngsters in the Lab timetripping for hours".

Sky Trip America was awarded Best Home Learning Software at the 1996 Technology & Learning Awards.

Sky Trip America was named one of the top 100 CD-ROMs by PC Magazine.
