= Read, Write & Type =

1995 video game

- Developer: Presage Software
- Publisher: The Learning Company
- Platforms: Windows; Macintosh
- Release: 1995
- Genre: Educational

Read, Write & Type is a 1995 educational video game from The Learning Company. The game is for ages 5 to 9.

== Gameplay ==
"Read, Write & Type" helps students develop phonics, spelling, and typing skills by associating sounds with keyboard letters. Players team up with animated characters to save storytellers from a villain, completing activities like naming pictures, identifying sounds in words, and using correct typing techniques. They also practice forming words, phrases, and sentences using a simple word processor.

== Development ==
Read, Write & Type was developed by Presage Software, a company founded in 1986 and based in San Rafael, California.

== Reception ==
Reception

Review scores
Publication	Score
Macworld	3.5/5
MacUser	4/5
Quad-City Times	4/4

Winston-Salem Journal said "Although I haven't found a fresh test subject for this, I've found so much -from this company valuable and loved by kids that I can recommend the program".
