= Marsbook =

"Marsbook" is a 1993 interactive CD-ROM commissioned by NASA and developed by Human Code.

== Summary ==
Marsbook shows politicians their projections for the colonization of Mars. Based on SuperCard, it models NASA's proposed Mars habitat. The CD uses prerendered 3D graphics to allow users to virtually walk through a computer model of the habitat. Users can also walk through the IMH, retrieve information about different sections, browse the CAD database, and view Apple QuickTime-animated movies.

== Awards ==
"Marsbook" won two New Media Invision Awards, as well as an award from Business Week.

== See also ==
- Red Faction (video game) (2001 Video game set on Mars)
