= Wishbone and the Amazing Odyssey =

1996 video game

- Developers: Human Code; Palladium Interactive
- Platforms: Windows; Macintosh
- Release: September 1996

Wishbone and the Amazing Odyssey is a 1996 video game jointly developed by Human Code and Palladium Interactive. It is based on the Wishbone television series.

== Gameplay ==
The game begins with Wishbone introducing the technology that will bring the story to life, only to be pulled into the machine himself. The player's task is to guide him through the events of the Odyssey so he can escape by reaching the end of the story. Eurylochus, presented as one of Odysseus' men, appears throughout as comic relief, frequently offering excuses to avoid helping until Wishbone insists. As the adventure unfolds, players encounter problems that are resolved primarily through non‑violent means, with any violent moments from the myth occurring off‑screen. Along the way, items can be collected for later use, and the interface allows players to access simple controls from the main screen. A library is available at any time, containing information about Ancient Greece and the Odyssey, as well as a condensed version of the book that includes Wishbone's commentary.

== Development ==
In November 1995, Palladium Interactive inked a deal with Big Feats! Entertainment to produce CD-ROM versions of the Wishbone children's TV series. Wishbone and the Amazing Odyssey was released on Windows and Macintosh platforms.

== Reception ==
Reception

Review scores
| Publication | Score |
|---|---|
| All Game Guide | 4/5 |
| Quad-City Times | 3/4 |

All Game Guide called Wishbone and the Amazing Odyssey amusing and intelligent. CNET called the game's "strategy games" challenging and fun.
