= Contraption Zack =

1992 video game

- Developer: Presage Software
- Publisher: Mindscape
- Platforms: MS-DOS, Amiga
- Release: 1992: MS-DOS; 1993: Amiga

Contraption Zack is a video game from California-based developer Presage Software. It was published by Mindscape for MS-DOS in 1992, then the Amiga in 1993. The game involves the player, as Zack, fixing broken machines.

== Gameplay ==
Contraption Zack casts the player as a rookie repairman at Gadgetco, thrust into chaos on the player's very first day. With tools mysteriously "borrowed" and malfunctions rampant, the player's mission is to outwit the workplace and assert control. The game unfolds across a sprawling six-level, 60-room maze, but navigation alone will not suffice—each room presents a logical puzzle that demands careful sequencing and deduction. No special gear is needed; instead, the player must decipher interactions like buttons that raise or lower colored cones, crafting solutions from deceptively simple mechanics. The modular structure lets the player tackle puzzles one at a time, saving progress between breakthroughs.

== Development ==
The game was developed by Presage Software, a company founded in 1986.

== Reception ==
Reception

Review scores
Publication	Score
Aktueller Software Markt	8/12
Computer Game Review	87%
PC Joker	66%
PC Player	63%
Power Play	59%

PC World said "Contraption Zack is highly appealing, particularly for short coffee breaks".
