= Operation: Weather Disaster =

1995 video game

- Developer: Human Code
- Publisher: Discovery Channel Multimedia
- Platforms: Macintosh, Windows
- Release: 1995
- Genres: Adventure, Educational

Operation: Eco-Nightmare
- Developers: Discovery Channel Multimedia, Human Code
- Publisher: Egmont Interactive
- Composer: Joel Stearns
- Platform: Windows
- Release: 1997
- Genres: Adventure, Educational

Operation: Weather Disaster (aka Team Xtreme: Operation Weather Disaster) is a 1995 video game. Its sequel, Operation: Eco-Nightmare (aka Team Xtreme: Operation Eco-Nightmare) was released in 1997.

== Development ==
Discovery Channel approached a video game development company to commission a science-based game revolving around the weather. The prototype Human Code produced was more boring than expected. Discovery Channel let Human Code software director Gary Gattis focus on making the game fun first and educational second. Gattis extensively researched the weather in order to ensure accuracy. Over 30 minutes of 3D animation was created for the game. In March 1996, Discovery signed a deal to distribute a Spanish adaptation of the products in the American market and the Hispanic market. Upon Operation Weather Disaster)'s original release, it was neglected by consumers, according to Newsweek. The game was re-released in a new package in 1997.

== Plot ==
In Operation Weather Disaster, a TV weatherman who is bored with the sameness of the weather conditions, reporting 267 consecutive sunny days in Arizona, decides to change the world's climate in a devious plan. An emergency task force called Team Xtreme is put into place to restore the world order and defeat the madman.

In Operation Eco-Nightmare, as a member of Team Xtreme's eco division, the player investigates an environment protection group that is headed by Jonah Rainwater, the antagonist of the previous game.

== Gameplay ==
In Operation Weather Disaster, the game is an educational point-and-click adventure that is a clone to Myst. It featured a series of 360 degree screens to navigate through, and FMV cutscenes.

In Operation Eco-Nightmare, the game features a series of 360° screens. Players look for items to add to their inventory, and use them to solve puzzles. FMV sequences brief the player on each new assignment. The game addressed environmental issues such as recycling, energy efficiency and eco-technology.

== Critical reception ==
=== Operation Weather Disaster ===
Robert Coffey of World Village praised its graphics, puzzles, and ability to balance subtlety infuse educational material into the narrative. In his journal article How’s the Weather: Simulating Weather in Virtual Environments, Matt Barton cited Operation Weather Disaster as an example of a game that incorporates weather in a thought-provoking way. Feibel praised the game for seamlessly incorporating education into the ludic experience. Boys' Life felt the interactive portions of the game made it feel like much more than an encyclopedia. The Austin Chronicle felt the game, along with Nile: Passage to Egypt, appeals to a broad age range, and incorporate both information and action. The Sydney Morning Herald deemed it a "great mix of game-play and learning". The Tennessean also deemed it a prime example of an all-family science adventure. The Courier-Journal felt the game contained hours of exciting, intense and intellectual challenges. While Natural History generally did not review video games, they found themselves drawn to the title due to its promise to cultivate their meteorological skills. The Washington Post felt the title was not difficult.

The game won an EMMA Award. The title also received Gold in the New Media's Invision '96 category of Best Children's Title.

=== Operation Eco-Nightmare ===
PC Player felt a sense of adventure game fatigue, noting that the game and its contemporaries were all similar in gameplay and style. The Sydney Morning Herald thought the game, along with Where in the World is Carmen Sandiego 3.0 was the best choice to encourage reluctant readers due to its incorporation of reading into the game.
