= Tickson Music =

Tickson Music was a Hollywood-based music publishing company; songwriters signed to Tickson Music included members of The Byrds, and writer Bill Martin.

Tickson Music owned Martin's song "All of Your Toys", which The Monkees chose as their first song to record with the whole band playing. The record unfortunately couldn't be released, as parent company Screen Gems had a rule that all Monkees songs had to be Screen Gems property, and Tickson Music wouldn't sell the copyright. (Martin signed a new publishing contract with Screen Gems.)

Another song published by Tickson Music was "You Showed Me", written by Byrds Roger McGuinn and Gene Clark and covered by The Turtles; former Monkees producer Chip Douglas introduced the Turtles to the song.
