= Arthur's 1st Grade =

- Developer: Human Code
- Publisher: The Learning Company
- Platforms: Windows; Macintosh
- Release: 1999
- Genre: Educational

Arthur's 1st Grade is a 1999 video game developed by Human Code and published by The Learning Company. An updated Arthur's 1st Grade: 2001 Edition was released in 2001.

== Gameplay ==
The player helps Arthur and his friends participate in Bionic Bunny's Good Deeds Contest by completing a series of first‑grade learning activities that cover vocabulary, spelling, sentence construction, reading, arithmetic, matching and sorting, measurement, and related critical‑thinking skills. As the player finishes each task, progress is tracked through a Progress Bar and Goal Checker, and completing all activities awards a printable certificate that unlocks three arcade‑style bonus games featuring a bubble‑shooting octopus, an obstacle‑dodging racecar, and a puzzle challenge. A second disc offers creative activities in which the player can compose music, create and print a personalized storybook, and access additional printable worksheets and demos of other educational titles.

== Reception ==
Reception

Review scores
Publication	Score
All Game Guide	3.5/5 (2001) version
Macworld	3.5/5

Macworld called Arthur's 1st Grade worth the time to get to know Arthur and his friends. Kids Domain recommended Arthur's 1st Grade to Arthur fans.
