= Rune (film) =

Rune is the first feature film, either independent or otherwise, to debut on Apple Inc.'s Video iPod. It was released on October 10, 2006. Its main character is a linguist who is doing research on the source of all modern languages.

Special effects in the film were done by Santa Monica's Radium, a firm with credits ranging from Target commercials to feature films like Spider-Man 2.

According to online press releases, the film was shot over the course of 2 months, a fairly long shoot by the standards of independent film, and was entirely independently financed.

The film's cast is international and diverse, with German ingénue Anna Bäumer as the linguist, and veteran character actor Bill Wise, a veteran of a number of Richard Linklater films.

The movie also used several local actors from the states of Texas and Oklahoma. Oklahoma City was used for a lot of the scene in the movie and housed the Isis Production Company office for the shoot of the film.
