= Arthur's Preschool =

- Developer: Human Code
- Publisher: Mattel Interactive
- Platform: Windows
- Release: 2000
- Genre: Educational

Arthur's Preschool is a 2000 video game developed by Human Code and published by Mattel Interactive.

== Gameplay ==
The player selects one of eight Arthur characters and enters a treehouse where the player and a chosen companion move through activities involving phonics, matching, counting, letter recognition, and building with shapes, each introduced by spoken instructions from Arthur and his friends. The player's name appears on every screen after completing tasks such as counting baseballs, matching puppet parts by pattern, and fitting coins into piggy banks of corresponding sizes. Instructions are repeated if the player pauses, all onscreen text is read aloud, and three selectable skill levels adjust the complexity of the exercises. Successful completion rewards the player with a printable certificate featuring additional activities, and the two included CD-ROMs provide eight learning games and a set of preschool activities.

== Reception ==
Reception

Review scores
Publication	Score
Discovery School	9.4/10
Macworld	4/5
The Bulletin	4.5/5

Los Angeles Times liked the tutorial and graphics in Arthur's Preschool. Kids Domain called Arthur's Preschool a great value with a great interface.
