= Nile: Passage to Egypt =

1995 video game

- Developer: Human Code
- Publisher: Discovery Channel Multimedia
- Platforms: Macintosh, Windows
- Genres: Educational, Simulation

Nile: Passage to Egypt is a 1995 educational video game by the Discovery Channel.

== Gameplay ==
Players undertake an interactive journey down the Nile River through modern and ancient Egypt on an Egyptian sailing boat called a felucca. Players explore local culture and interact with customers via virtual tours. The player navigates through a series of 360 degree screens, or can also choose new locations via a map. Hotspots on the screen trigger 40 films, 300 pictures, 3.5 hours of audio narration, and text.

== Development ==
The game was part of a "co-promotional strategy" which involved a CD-ROM and television program of the same name being released concurrently. The game's released was tentatively scheduled for release in Spring of 1995.

== Critical reception ==
Jaime de Yraolagoitia of PC World stated that the game was a pleasant way to learn more about Egyptian culture, and was suitable for all ages. Lance Elko of Computer Shopper described the experience as rich and engrossing. Grand Forks Herald thought the multimedia elements were excellent and complemented each other.

The game won the Software Consumer Award for Best Home Learning Program for Adults at the 1996 Codie awards.
