= Chess Mates =

1996 video game

- Developer: Presage Software
- Publisher: Brainstorm
- Designer: Dane Bigham
- Platforms: Classic Mac OS; Windows
- Release: NA: September 6, 1996
- Genre: Chess
- Mode: Single-player

Chess Mates is a computer software program, released in 1996 for Macintosh and 1997 for Microsoft Windows, designed to teach the basics of Chess. Chess Mates was marketed as an easy way for children to learn the building blocks of becoming a successful chess player. It was developed by Presage Software. The original price was $34.95.

== Reception ==
Reception

Review score
Publication	Score
All Game Guide	4/5

Although relatively few copies were released, the game has received favorable reviews. Discovery School cited the game's appealing graphics, sense of humor, and effective teaching of the various aspects of Chess.

The game was a finalist in the Best Home Education for Pre-Teens games category in the 1997 CODiE Awards.
