= Zurk's Rainforest Lab =

1994 video game

- Developer: Soleil Software
- Publisher: Soleil Software
- Platforms: Windows; Macintosh
- Release: 1994
- Genre: Educational

Zurk's Rainforest Lab is a 1994 educational video game from Soleil Software. The game is for ages 5 to 9.

== Gameplay ==
In Zurk's Rainforest Lab, children ages 5 to 9 explore an illustrated jungle environment brought to life with watercolor visuals, ambient jungle sounds, and Brazilian jazz. Guided by the friendly character Zurk, players engage in interactive activities that teach life science and math concepts. A gameplay element involves classifying animals into categories—mammals, birds, reptiles, amphibians, or insects—encouraging critical thinking skills.

== Development ==
Zurk's Rainforest Lab was developed by Soleil Software, a company founded in 1992.

== Reception ==
Reception

Review score
Publication	Score
Quad-City Times	3/4

CNET said "Other makers of educational software should take a lesson from Zurk's Rainforest Lab's book, using facts about an interesting topic to stimulate creative writing and critical thinking. On the other hand, the richness of the computer as a learning medium can certainly be put to better use than it is in this program"

Kids Domain said "Zurk's Rainforest Lab is an older game and seems dated when compared to newer programs about the rainforest, but will still educate and entertain"

Zurk's Rainforest Lab was given an Excellence Award by the National Association for the Education of Young Children.
