= Zowie Intertainment =

Toy company

- Type: Subsidiary
- Industry: Smart toy
- Founded: 1998
- Founder: Philippe P. Piernot; Amy Francetic; Allan Alcorn
- Fate: Acquired by Lego
- Parent: Lego (2000-Present)

Zowie Intertainment was a smart toy research company founded in 1998 by a group of engineers from Interval Research Corporation that focused on applying various computer and sensor technology research to smart toy development. In 2000, toy design and manufacturing firm Lego acquired ownership of Zowie Intertainment as part of their smart toy division.

Zowie Intertainment primarily relied on embedding proprietary RF sensors and recognition technologies in physical toys such as plastic figurines to create different game play and interaction experiences that could also be interfaced via a computer screen.

== History ==
In 1998, Zowie Intertainment was initially spun-off from Interval Research Corporation by Philippe P. Piernot, Allan Alcorn, and Amy Francetic among others.

Zowie Intertainment’s portfolio of proprietary sensing and recognition technologies was called the Zowie Power. Zowie Intertainment released smart toy playsets such as Ellie's Enchanted Garden and Redbeard's Pirate Quest, play-sets that merged playing with plastic figurines with interacting with a computer game.

The company’s acquisition by Lego was part of Lego’s plan to fuse digital aspects of play to physical toys, a hybrid interaction internally referred to as “fluid play.” With a concept to create a toy-computer play-set based on the then popular Lego Duplo Circus theme, Lego also brought on the technology development team of Zowie Intertainment to work on a smart toy technology platform called the KidPad. However, due to the dot-com bubble crash and the ensuing economic difficulties, the KidPad Circus and related programs at Lego were cancelled.

Zowie Intertainment was also one of the companies that organized discussions regarding psychological and developmental concerns of children interacting with smart toys and electronic playthings.
