= Manchester Township, Cumberland County, North Carolina =

Civil township in North Carolina, U.S.

Coordinates: 35°11′11″N 78°59′55″W

Manchester Township is a civil township in Cumberland County, North Carolina, United States. The population was 24,643 at the 2010 census.
