= Games Domain =

Former video game website

Games Domain was a video game website founded by Dave Stanworth and based in Birmingham, UK. In the late 1990s, it was at one time mirrored in seven countries and had a tumultuous history of being purchased by different corporations over its 11-year existence. It was active from March 1994 until March 2005. By 2002, the Domain was considered one of the leading gaming sites, with approximately 1.4 million users and 15 million page views per month. It also had two sister sites - Kids Domain, focusing on children's titles, and Console Domain, focusing on console games. The site's primary URLs were www.gamesdomain.co.uk (UK) and www.gamesdomain.com (US). A print magazine, Games Domain Offline, was launched on December 1, 1999.

The site's main areas were the GD Review, an online magazine which consisted mostly of staff reviews and previews of games; the Downloads section, featuring game demos, patches, and shareware; and the Games Info section, with FAQs and walkthroughs.

In 1998, Arcade magazine wrote about the site: "What it lacks in professional shine it makes up for with passion and commitment."

== History of ownership ==
In early 1998, Games Domain was acquired by The Attitude Network, which also hosted popular gaming site HappyPuppy.com. Theglobe.com, at the time a successful new web portal, purchased Attitude Network in a $52.8 million deal in April 1999. By 2000, after acquiring games retailer Chips & Bits and Computer Games Magazine publisher Strategy Plus, theglobe.com was considered the second largest online gaming network. However, like several companies from the dotcom era, the company went bust within two years. Theglobe.com sold these operations in August 2001 and continued with a reduced games division consisting of just Computer Games Magazine and the Chips & Bits mail-order service until the present day.

The site had been up for sale since July 2001, and would not find a home until October of that year. BT Openworld, the internet arm of British Telecom, purchased Games Domain to boost its online gaming division. BT launched a new service on the site called Games Domain Multiplay in November 2001, providing servers for online gamers at a price. It was unsuccessful, and within 16 months the Multiplay service was shut down.

In November 2003, BT sold Games Domain to Yahoo!. The site would be integrated into Yahoo's softfields.com. During the Yahoo years, Games Domain was revamped visually and covered both console and PC games until Yahoo abandoned the brand and URL in March 2005. https://www.softfields.com/
