= Starfire Soccer Challenge =

1998 video game

- Developer(s): Purple Moon
- Release: 1998

Starfire Soccer Challenge is a video game by Purple Moon, released in November 1998.

== Plot and gameplay ==
The game sees the player control an all-girls soccer team. The game sees a continuation of the characters from Rockett's New School and Secret Paths.

== Production ==
The game's pioneering design was, like other Purple Moon titles, built off of years of research. At the time, American women were close to winning the World Cup, and women's soccer had become important to the target market. The research impacted both the plot and the user interface (UI) of the title. It became the first sports CD-ROM designed for girls. While boys' sports games have superstar athletes, this game was designed to have girl next door characters that the player could relate to. Sarah Stocker served as the game's producer.

== Critical reception ==
The game received a more positive reception from feminists than Purple Moon's other games. Brenda Laurel: Pioneering Games for Girls noted the game took a fresh take on the sports game. The journal article Stuck on Screens: Patterns of Computer and Gaming Station Use in Youth Seen in a Psychiatric Clinic described the game as an "outstanding example of digital technology supporting positive emotional development".

The game received a nomination for "PC Children's Entertainment Title of the Year" at the 2nd Annual Interactive Achievement Awards.
