= Cybervision =

Cybervision or CyberVision may refer to:

- CyberVision 2001, an early home computer
- CyberVision PPC, add-on cards for Amiga computers
- CyberVision (game developer)

== See also ==
- Machine vision
