= Girls' video games =

1990s video game genre

Girls' video games are a genre of video games developed for young girls, mainly in the 1990s. The attempts in this period by several developers to specifically target girls, which they considered underserved by a video game industry mainly attempting to cater to boys' tastes, are also referred to as the "girls' games movement."

An early game designed for girls was Jenny of the Prairie, written by Rhiannon Software in 1984. Developers Elizabeth Stott and her friend Lucy Ewell founded the software company to encourage young girls' interest in computers.

A notable developer of girls' games was Purple Moon, founded in 1995, which made a series of "coming-of-age games" featuring the teenager Rockett Movado. Its products were part of the so-called "purple games" segment of girls' games, which based its games on market research into the preferences and tastes of young girls. Because these tended to be stereotypically feminine interests such as gossip, relationships, and makeup, "purple games" were criticized by feminists who considered them too prescriptive. Purple Moon's games did not perform well commercially, and the company was bought by Mattel in 1999.

The FEMICOM Museum is an organization, founded in 2012, that seeks to preserve these games and raise public awareness about them. A panel at the 2015 IndieCade Festival discussed their history.

== See also ==
=== Girls' video game series ===
- American Girl
- Angelique
- Barbie
- Imagine
- Jewelpet
- Mary-Kate and Ashley
- Nancy Drew
- Powerpuff Girls
- Rhiannon Software
- Sailor Moon
- Strawberry Shortcake

=== Other ===
- Virtual dress-up game
- Casio Loopy
- Gender role
- Girls' toys and games
- Women and video games
- Otome game
