= Rockett's New School =

1997 video game

- Developers: Purple Moon; Presage Software
- Platforms: Macintosh; Windows
- Release: 1997

Rockett's New School is a 1997 adventure video game developed by Purple Moon and primarily aimed at girls. The game follows Rockett Movado as she starts eighth grade at a new school. Rather than focusing on action, the game centres on friendship, everyday school life and emotional decision-making. Players can learn more about the characters by exploring their lockers and journals. The game was developed after five years of research into girls' gaming preferences. It sold 250,000 copies and received mixed reviews, with critics divided over its quality and its representation of games designed for girls.

== Production ==
Five years of research was spent on the game. During this time, Laurel discovered that boys and girls play games differently, and that girls wanted a slower-paced and more introspective experience as opposed to the action-based twitch gameplay that appealed to boys. A website launch and a serious media hype preceded the release of Purple Moon's first two titles: Rockett's New School and Secret Paths. Two 30-second TV spots for the games were aired on network and cable stations in New York and Chicago in October-November 1997. Rockett even appeared with a moustache in the "Got Milk?" ad series. The game was conceived as part of an episodic series of CD-ROMS, with unresolved plot elements that would be addressed in the following titles. Episode 2, Rockett's Tricky Decision, was expected to come out in January 1998. The game's success led to a website, merchandise, and talks about a television adaption. Mattel bought Purple Moon in 1999 in order to add the Rockett brand to their successful girls' video gaming empire that had begun with Barbie. Mattel aimed to expand the franchise with a book series. Another game entitled Starfire Soccer Challenge was not serialised due to the imminent acquisition of the company by Mattel.

== Gameplay and design ==
The game follows Rockett Movado as she begins the first day of eighth grade at her new school. The game's genre is "friendship adventures for girls", which Wired deemed to be a new game category created by Brenda Laurel, Purple Moon's co-founder. The game's design was built on the notion of girls not wanting to play as a superhero, rather as a friend, experiencing real-life events, encounters, and emotions that they would understand. The player can discover more about each player by examining their locker or reading their journal, which allowed each character more three-dimensionality than in traditional hero vs villain games. The game avoids text when it can and instead portrays information through graphical imagery, in order to help players identify with the protagonist by seeing what she sees.

In the sequel, Rockett's Tricky Decision, Rockett is invited to two parties on the same night.

== Critical reception ==
Reception

Review score
Publication	Score
MacHome Journal	3/5

The first Christmas sell-in exceeded the developer's expectations, and the press coverage was 95 percent positive. During December 1997 alone, Rockett's New School sold 39,174 units in the United States, for revenues of $1.1 million. It ultimately sold 250,000 units. However, a review by The New York Times commented that he didn't need to play the game with young girls because he knew a bad game when he saw it, which was reprinted in a popular Silicon Valley newspaper San Jose Mercury News. The title was attacked by both reviewers (who felt it was objectively a poor game) and feminists (who felt it was a bad example of what a "game for girls" could be). Entertainment Weekly described the title as "thoughtfully addictive". CNN asserts that while successful, the games never "became the runaway hits the company hoped they would be".

In a retrospective review, BuzzFeed called the title "The Mean Girls Of '90s Games". Laurel herself asserts that girls found a community within the game.
