= Gender representation in video games =

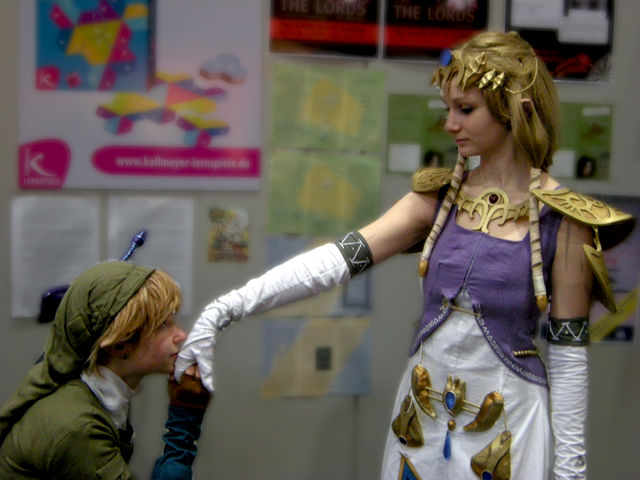
Cosplayers dressed as Link and Princess Zelda from The Legend of Zelda video game series. Link is consistently portrayed as the male champion and defender of the series' eponymous character, whose depiction has, in contrast, seen different iterations throughout the history of the series.

The portrayal of gender in video games, as in other media, is a subject of research in gender studies and is discussed in the context of sexism in video gaming. Although women make up about half of video game players, they are significantly underrepresented as characters in mainstream games, despite the prominence of iconic heroines such as Samus Aran or Lara Croft. Women in games often reflect traditional gender roles, sexual objectification, or stereotypes such as the "damsel in distress". Male characters can also be stereotyped, frequently depicted as big and muscular, and LGBTQ characters have been slow to appear due to the cis-heteronormativity of the medium.

Research suggests that gender portrayal in games can influence players' perceptions of gender roles, especially in young people. On average, game sales are highest in games showing non-central, over-sexualized female characters, and female characters that don't fit those criteria are underrepresented.

== Gamer demographics ==
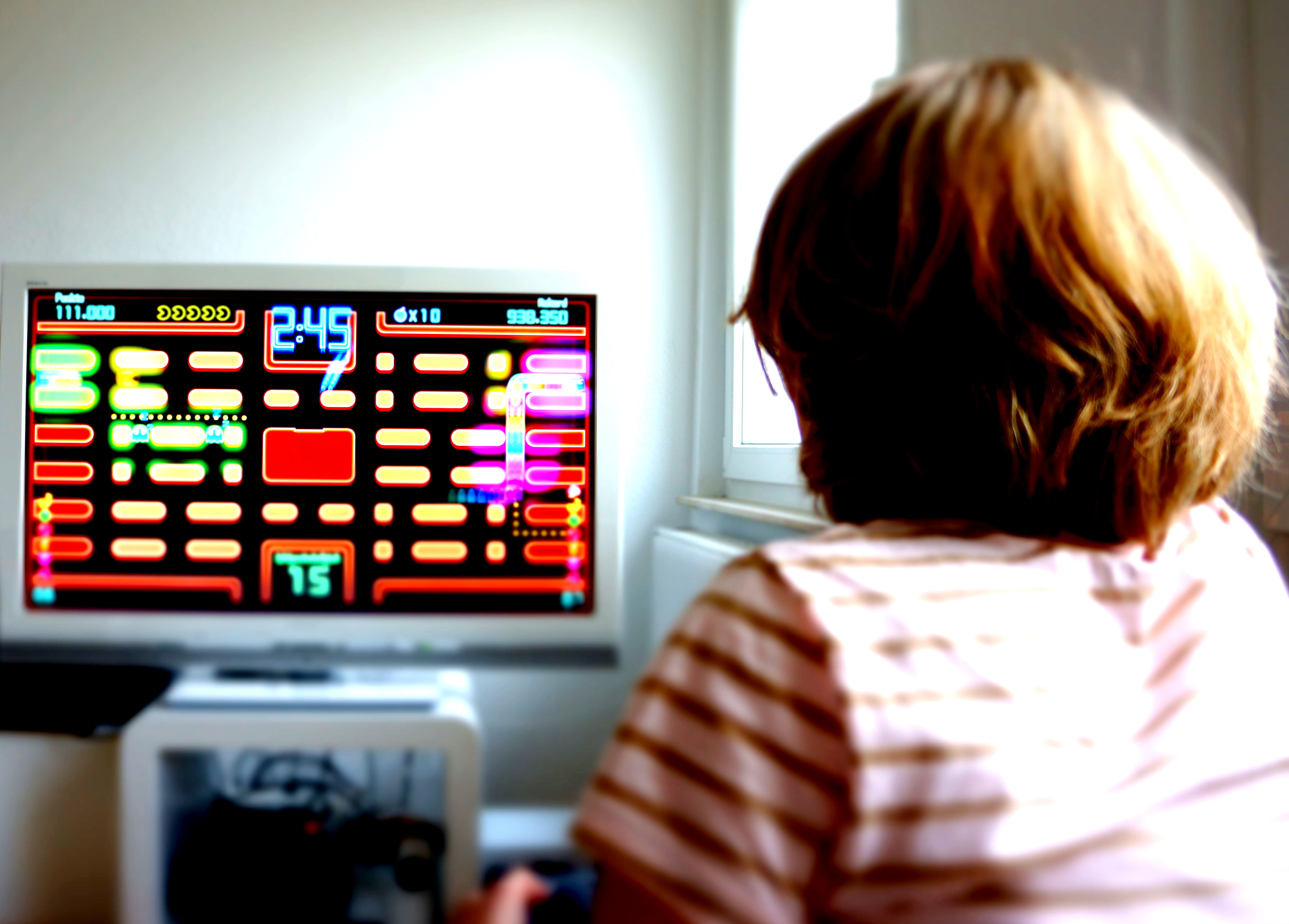
A young girl playing Pac-Man Championship Edition

A 2008 Gallup poll indicated that men and women each make up half of all American video game players. In 2014, women comprised 52% of video game players in the UK and 48% in Spain. According to a 2008 study by the Pew Research Center, "fully 99% of boys and 94% of girls" play video games.

Both genders play video games, but studies suggest differences in platform and genre preference. In 2010, the Entertainment Software Rating Board reported that 80% of female console gamers played on Wii, 11% on Xbox 360, and 9% on PlayStation 3, while 38% of male console gamers played Xbox 360, 41% played Wii, and 21% played PlayStation 3.

A 2013 Flurry study compared mobile gaming preferences, finding women made up 60–80% of solitaire, slots, social turn-based, match-three/bubble-shooter, management/simulation, and quiz game markets. Men composed 60–80% of strategy, shooter, card battle, racing, and action role-playing game markets.

A 2014 SuperData Research study found women compose 57.8% of the mobile market, 53.6% of the RPG market, and 50.2% of the PC market (including social games). Men make up 66% of MMORPG players, 66% of first-person shooter players, and 63% of digital console players.

On average, female-led games sell less but also have lower marketing budgets. Testing the conditions under which gender representation predicts game sales is important. Adolescents who played games frequently showed less concern about the effects of negatively stereotyped images compared to those who played infrequently or not at all. Game use frequency correlates with views on gender representation in games played.

== Portrayal of women ==
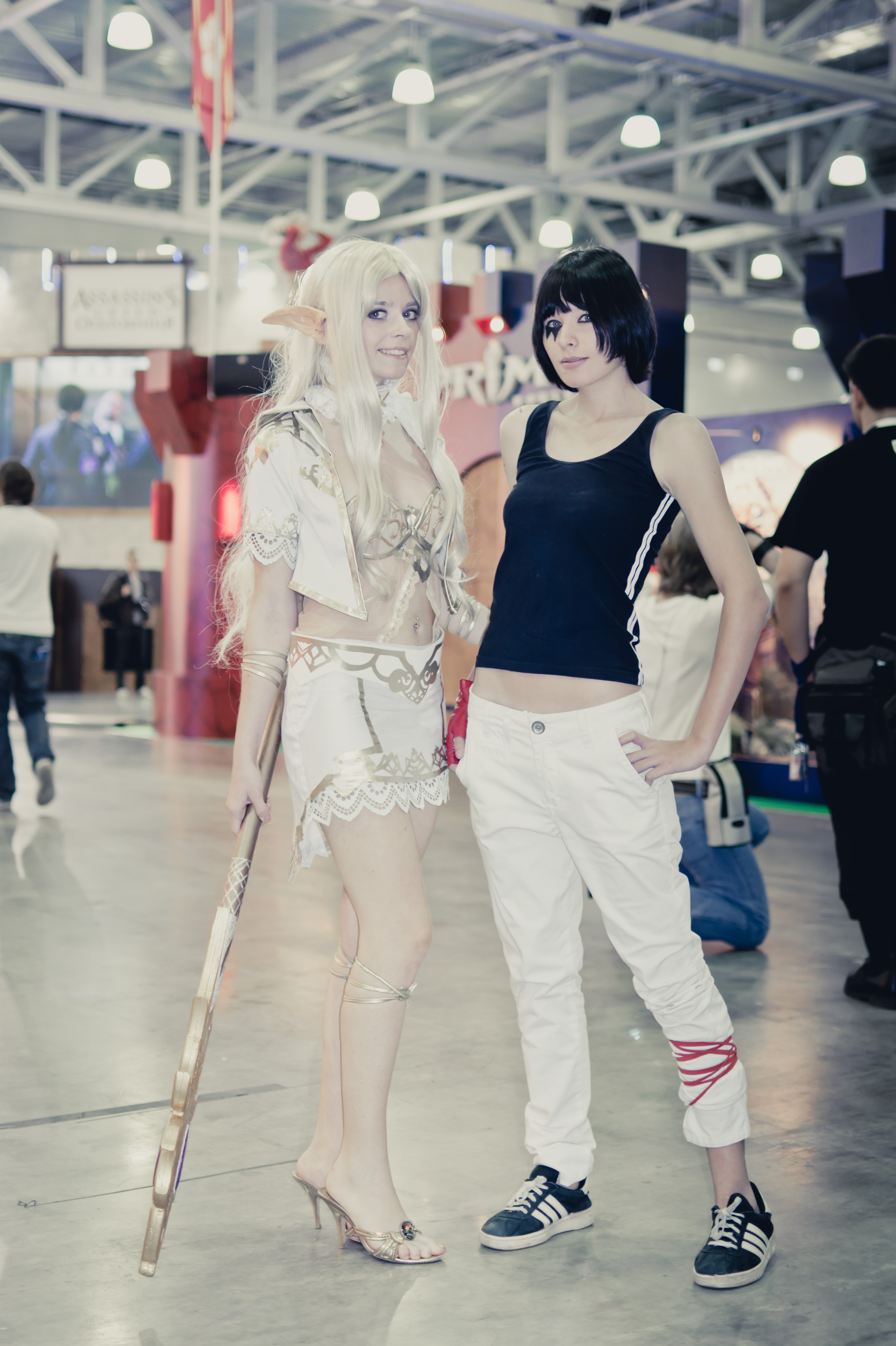
The characters of Light Elf from Lineage II (left) and Faith Connors from Mirror's Edge (right) portrayed at IgroMir 2011

=== As player characters ===
==== Prevalence ====
A 2006 study from Virginia Polytechnic Institute and State University found playable female characters appear less frequently than males in reviews of popular games. A 2007 study by Melinda C. R. Burgess et al. found men are featured much more often than women on console video game covers.

In a 2012 sample of 669 action, shooter, and role-playing games selected by EEDAR, 300 (45%) provided the option to play as a female, but only 24 (4%) had an exclusively female protagonist. EEDAR found in 2010 that 10% of games had a protagonist with an indiscernible gender. Downs and Smith (2010) analyzed the top 20 best selling US games in 2003, finding only 14% of characters were female.

According to Madeline Messer in The Washington Post in 2015, among the top 50 endless running mobile games, 98% of those with gender-identifiable characters featured male protagonists, 90% of which were free to play. 46% offered female characters, and only 15% for free. Playing as a girl required, on average, an additional $7.53 purchase, much more than the games themselves cost.

==== Evolution ====
Namco's arcade video game Pac-Man (1980), while starring a male protagonist, was "the first commercial video game to involve large numbers of women" as players. The game's popularity among women led Midway Games, its North American distributor, to develop Ms. Pac-Man (1982) starring a female protagonist as their "way of thanking all those lady arcaders who have played and enjoyed Pac-Man." The earlier arcade game Score (1977) by Exidy represented female characters, but no screenshots are known to be available.

Samus Aran, the heroine of Metroid (1986) and its successors, is often cited as "the first playable human female character in a mainstream video game". There were several earlier, less-popular video games with playable human female characters, including Billie Sue from Wabbit (1982), Becky from Otenba Becky no Daibouken (1983), Lilly from Lilly Adventure (1983), Barbie (1984), PSK's ALICE (1984), Papri from Girl's Garden (1984), Jenny from Jenny of the Prairie (1984), Toby Masuyo ("Kissy") from Baraduke (1985), Kurumi-Hime from Ninja Princess (1985), Flashgal (1985), Alexandra from Lode Runner's Rescue (1985), Athena (1986), Chris from Alpha (1986), Ki from The Return of Ishtar (1986), and Valkyrie from Valkyrie no Bōken (1986).

Studies of the prevalence of female characters in video games began to be conducted in sociological, educational, and cultural journals as early as the late 1970s and early 1980s. In 1979, researchers publishing in The Psychological Record (Vol.29, No.1. Pp. 43–48) concluded from the results of a 201-person survey that 90% of male subjects and 85% of female subjects perceived the computer as masculine (in gameplay versus the computer). In 1983, professor Sara Kiesler et al. published a study in Psychology Today finding that female characters appeared in video games at a frequency of 1 game in 7. Elizabeth Behm-Morawitz suggested that the reduced presence of female characters implies a secondary status for women in video games, and further suggested that when playable female characters do appear in video games, they are more often scantily-dressed and oversexualized than men.

In 1994, Australian Hyper magazine writer Virginia Barratt accused the video game industry of being sexist for its lack of female representation, stating that video games "are made by boys for boys who play with other boys" and that girls "rarely get a look in, unless of course there's a victim who needs to be rescued or someone needs to wear a bikini to cheer the macho men on." She also said that many female players, despite enjoying popular arcade games such as Street Fighter II and Mortal Kombat, were discouraged from visiting arcades due to their status as male-dominated spaces.

Lara Croft, the protagonist of Tomb Raider (1996), is among the best-known strong, fictional women in a variety of media. Since her introduction in 1996, the character of Croft has been criticized for her "unrealistic" breast size; Lara was claimed to personify "an ongoing culture clash over gender, sexuality, empowerment, and objectification." In a 2008 Tomb Raider title, Croft was depicted in "hot pants and midriffs" and was said to look like she was "dressed by a male". However, the game's creators maintain that she was not designed with marketing in mind, and have claimed to be rather surprised at her pinup-style adoration. In Tomb Raider: Legend, Lara underwent a radical redesign, ostensibly to make her less sexualized.

April Ryan from The Longest Journey (1999) has been compared to Lara Croft, as she shows less prominent physical feminine attributes than Lara but more feminine psychological traits, as contrasted with Lara's masculine connotations like aggressiveness and force. Contrarily, Jade, the protagonist of Beyond Good & Evil (2003), was widely recognized as a strong and confident female character lacking any overt sexualization.

The year 2013 featured women in leading roles in a number of award-winning games such as The Last of Us (2013), BioShock Infinite (2013), the rebooted Tomb Raider (2013), and Beyond: Two Souls (2013). A study of these games found that although the leading female characters in these games were able to subvert predominant gender stereotypes, women were still limited by men in the narratives, in particular through benevolent sexism.

In 2014, the developers' choice to omit playable women in the latest iterations of the top-tier gaming franchises Assassin's Creed and Far Cry became a focus of discussions in gaming media. This indicated, according to game industry professionals cited by Polygon, a shift in the industry's attention towards issues of diversity in gaming, in conjunction with video games as a whole growing beyond their former core audience of younger men.

The announcement trailer for Battlefield V in 2018 was met with backlash from some fans of the series, who took issue with the potential portrayal of women in the game. Their main point of contention was with the British woman featured in the trailer, citing the character's presence as unrealistic due to women on the British side never participating in frontline combat during World War II and being mostly relegated to supporting roles.

=== As supporting characters ===
Female characters are often cast in the role of the damsel in distress, with their rescue being the objective of the game. Princess Zelda in the early The Legend of Zelda series, the Sultan's daughter in Prince of Persia, and Princess Peach through much of the Mario series are paradigmatic examples. By 2013, Peach appeared in 14 of the main Super Mario games and was kidnapped in 13 of them. The only main games that Peach was not kidnapped in were in the North America release of Super Mario Bros. 2, Super Mario 3D World, and Super Mario Bros. Wonder, but she was a character that can be played. Zelda became playable in some later games of The Legend of Zelda series or had the pattern altered. Shanon Sherman described how the illustrations on video game covers portrayed women in need of rescue. She wrote that these covers reinforce the existing gender stereotypes and sexual discrimination against women.

Gerudo women in The Legend of Zelda series returned in the 2017 game Breath of the Wild. They live in an all-female town that Link infiltrates by wearing a "an exoticized belly dancer/harem costume, complete with veil". According to some critics, the quest is transmisogynist, involving purchasing clothes from an exaggerated stereotype of a trans woman, whose face Link cringes at, before employing another transphobic stereotype: a man (Link) disguising himself as a woman to enter a woman-only space. The women there mainly discuss how attracted they are to men, which some say appeals to a presumed cis, straight male player.

A number of games feature a female character as an ally or sidekick to the male hero. Some of them, like Ada Wong of Resident Evil and Mona Sax of Max Payne, were turned into player characters in later instances of their series. Alyx Vance, a supporting protagonist of Half-Life 2, was praised for her "stinging personality" and intelligence, developing a close bond with the player without simply being "eye candy".

In 1998, Michigan State University analyzed 33 popular games for the Nintendo and Sega Genesis consoles. Collected data shows that only 15% of games had a female role as a protagonist or an active character. In 41% of games, there were simply no female characters, and in the rest they were assigned the role of victims or sexual objects.

Jeroen Jannsz and Raynel G. Martis conducted research on the representation of gender within video games; the 12 games examined included 22 characters. Two games did not have a second or supporting character in the intro cutscene: Splinter Cell focused exclusively on protagonist Sam Fisher, and Tomb Raider: Angel of Darkness focused exclusively on Lara Croft. The analysis showed a dominance of male characters in the games. Thirteen of 22 game characters (about 60%) were men. Among the leading characters there was an equal gender distribution (six men; six women), but supporting characters turned out to be seven men (70%) and three women (30%). A difference appeared between characters who had a leading part in the game and those in a supporting role. Jannsz and Martis stated that there is a depiction of a lead role being in a commanding position and the narrative being about them. This is consistent with masculinized traits such as leadership and independence that may be given to female characters along with sexualized attributes so they are "sexy" and appealing.

=== As antagonists ===
One of the first major female villains in video games was the Dark Queen in Battletoads (1991) and its sequels. SHODAN, an artificial intelligence with a female voice and a female face, was the main villain of the game System Shock (1994), praised as one of the most recognizable female characters in gaming. Another prominent classic female villain is Ultimecia, the main antagonist in Final Fantasy VIII (1999). Similarly, GLaDOS from Portal (2007), a megalomaniacal computer with a female voice, was praised by critics as one of the best new characters of the 2000s.

=== Sexualization ===
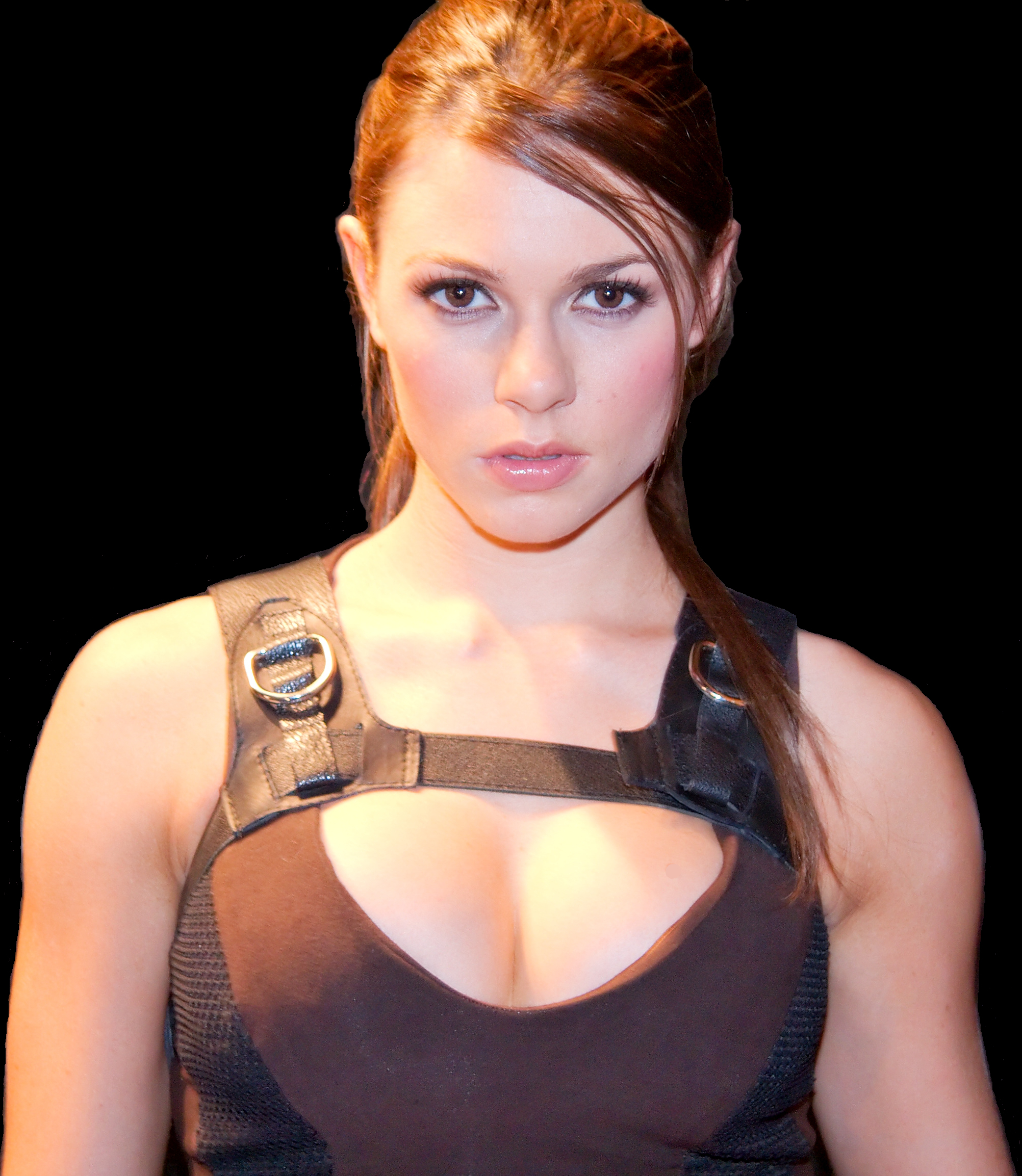
The video game heroine Lara Croft, here portrayed by Alison Carroll, is often used as an example of the sexual objectification of women in games.

The portrayal of women in video games has been the subject of academic study and controversy since the early 1980s. Recurring themes in articles and discussions on the topic include the sexual objectification and sexualization of female characters, done to appeal to a largely male audience, as well as the degree to which female characters are independent from their male counterparts within the same game. The sexualization of women involves the use of female bodies in a way that renders them the object of a sexual gaze or perception by others; their bodies are objectified, and they are reduced to that of a sex object. Research on exposure to sexualized media representations of women in television and magazines has asked whether it reduces male compassion toward women, and reduces women's perceptions of their desire and suitability for various vocations.

==== Prevalence ====
In their 2005 study, Karen E. Dill and K. P. Thill distinguish three major stereotypical depictions of women in gaming: (1) sexualized, (2) scantily clad, and (3) a vision of beauty. The study revealed that over 80% of women in video games represented one of these depictions. More than one quarter of female characters embodied all of the three stereotypical categories at once. Dill and Thill also note that another prevalent theme in the depiction of women was a combination of aggression and sex, referred to as "eroticized aggression". According to sociology professor and researcher Tracy Dietz, women are often depicted in stereotypical roles that typically pertain to sexuality in which the woman focuses upon beauty/physical attractiveness. According to an analysis conducted by Downs and Smith, playable and plot-relevant characters in the 60 best selling video games of 2003 were predominantly male. Females who were depicted were frequently sexualized. The female characters analyzed were depicted partially naked or with unrealistic proportions more often than the male characters were. A study of 225 video game covers found that both male and female character's physiques were overexaggerated, but women were more "physically altered" (especially in the bust) than their male counterparts, and even more so if the female was the main character of the game. Downs and Smith (2010) found that 41% of female video game characters appeared in sexually revealing clothing, and 43% were designed as partially or fully naked. Female characters were also more likely to be designed with unrealistic body proportions than male characters (25% vs 2%).

A 2011 study regarding gender identity and representation in Digital RPGs found that hyper-sexuality, which is often associated with female avatars, tends to negatively affect numerous types of gamers, who deeply identify with their avatar. The study found that this issue reifies the idea that "a woman's power, in-game or out, comes entirely from her sexuality".

A 2016 study of 571 games released between 1984 and 2014 found action games to be the highest ranked by genre, based on considerations of pronounced physics, unrealistic proportions, and revealing clothing. Adventure games followed in second place, followed by fighting games. Shooters, platformers, and RPG games ranked lowest in terms of character sexualization. However, this sexualization of female characters was at its height between 1990 and 2005 and then began to decline significantly. The study also determined that there was no significant difference in sexualization between games rated as "Teen" (for ages 13 and up) and "Mature" (17 and up) by the ESRB, indicating that sexualized women in games are so prevalent that they are not thought of as objectionable to children.

==== Forms ====
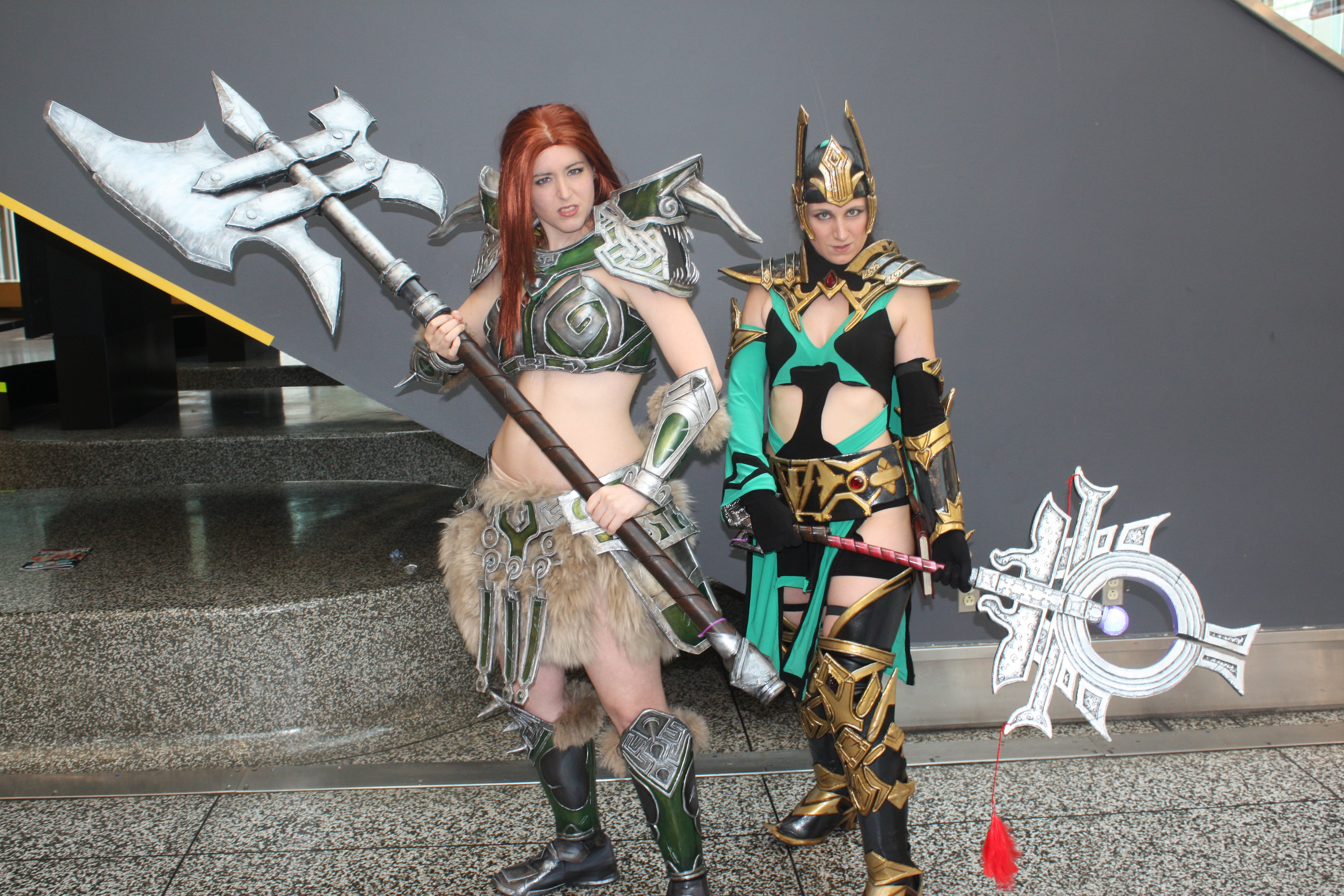
Women in 2015 costumed as scantily armored player characters from the video game Diablo III

Many early female video game characters (such as Ms. Pac-Man) are identical to an existing male character, except for a visual marker of their femininity, such as pink bows, lipstick and long eyelashes.

Female video game characters have been criticized as having a tendency to be objects of the "male gaze". A print ad for the fighting game Soulcalibur V received some controversy for simply being a close up of female character Ivy Valentine's breasts with a tagline. In two sequels of fighting games Soulcalibur and Tekken, set several years after the original, recurring male characters had all aged, but all female characters were kept the same age or were replaced by their daughters. Many games, particularly fighting games, also feature pronounced "breast physics", which make the breasts of female characters bounce or jiggle in a sometimes exaggerated manner.

A recurrent representation of women in fantasy settings, originating in the 1960s, is the female warrior dressed in scanty armor. They feature armor designs which have been described by such terms as "chainmail bikinis", largely consisting of small decorative plaques that reveal large portions of the body to the weather and expose vital organs, making them ineffective as protection. Such depictions are an instance of the general sexualization of women in geek culture, including in video games, comic and movies. In reaction to this, the art blog "Women Fighters in Reasonable Armor" compiles depictions of women fighters wearing "realistic" armor. In a similar vein, memes have depicted men in the scanty armor typical of female characters.

=== Violence against women ===
Video games have been criticized for depicting violence against women. For example, the 2013 game Dead Island: Riptide generated controversy when the special "zombie bait" edition of the game included a statue of a torso of a busty, dismembered woman in a skimpy bikini. Much of the Grand Theft Auto franchise features violence against women, especially Grand Theft Auto V, so much so that Target Australia withdrew the game from sale in response to criticism.

The 1982 adult game Custer's Revenge portrayed the rape of a Native American woman by the player's character of General Custer. Kotaku described the 2013 reboot of Tomb Raider as using rape for Lara Croft's character development; the developers denied that the scene at issue depicted an attempted rape.

==== The portrayal of women as victims ====
One prevalent form of violence against women in video games is the portrayal of female characters as helpless victims. This often involves scenarios where women are in need of rescue or protection by male protagonists. Such narratives reinforce gender power dynamics and perpetuate the idea that women are passive and dependent on men.

An example of this portrayal can be found in the Resident Evil series, where female characters, such as Jill Valentine or Claire Redfield, often find themselves in vulnerable situations, relying on male characters to save them. These portrayals can reinforce the notion of women as weak and in constant need of male intervention, limiting their agency and perpetuating harmful stereotypes (the "damsel in distress" myth referred to above).

==== Sexualized violence ====
Another concerning aspect is the depiction of sexualized violence against women in video games. This includes explicit scenes or storylines where female characters are subjected to sexual assault, harassment, or objectification. Such portrayals contribute to a culture that normalizes and trivializes violence against women.

The game Tomb Raider faced criticism for its early iterations, where the protagonist, Lara Croft, was often subjected to sexualized violence. The marketing and advertising of the game emphasized Lara's physical appearance, objectifying her as a sexual icon rather than focusing on her agency and capabilities as an adventurer. While the series has evolved to present a more nuanced portrayal of Lara, early iterations contributed to the objectification and commodification of women.

==== Stereotypical portrayals and reinforcement of gender roles ====
Many video games reinforce traditional gender roles and stereotypes, depicting women as submissive, sexual objects or as prizes to be won. These portrayals not only contribute to the objectification of women but also perpetuate harmful notions of gender roles and expectations.

The Grand Theft Auto series has faced criticism for its depiction of women as sexual objects and targets of violence. Female characters are often marginalized, serving as background decoration or engaging in stereotypical roles such as sex workers or damsels in distress. Such portrayals reinforce harmful gender stereotypes and contribute to a culture that devalues and objectifies women.

== Portrayal of men ==
Men are also often portrayed stereotypically in games. A recurring depiction of male sexuality is the power fantasy, where an apparent sexualization as an object of desire and hypermasculinity is overruled by the character's agency as the protagonist and avatar for the player's power within the game world.

=== Stereotyping and violence ===
Men in games tend to be large and muscular. For instance, men in video games have chests about 2 inches (6%) larger, heads about 13 inches bigger, waists 5 inches wider, and hips 7 inches wider than in reality. They are often characterized as overtly aggressive and violent. Following the releases of Grand Theft Auto V, the developers were met with criticism regarding both the portrayal of women and torture, but also that of men. Two of the main characters, Trevor Philips and Michael De Santa, have since been interpreted by some as portraying men as "liars, cheats, bad husbands and fathers, and psychopaths".

GamesRadar writer David Houghton, writing in an article on sexism in video games, was highly critical of many stereotypes that came with male protagonists, outlining them as "the primeval hunter/gatherer type [with] arm-cripplingly ripped biceps, necks too muscley to turn, emotion dials stuck on 'aggressive grimace' and a 50% lack of chest coverings".

Jamin Warren on PBS Game/Show highlighted that video games could promote "unreasonable body expectations, or an inability to express emotion, or the pressure to 'man up' and be a leader." He also highlighted that the vast majority of characters who perform and experience violence in video games are men, while women and children are generally to be protected.

=== Sexualization of men ===
The sexualization of men in video games is connected to the male gaze, which is the act of depicting people and the world, in the visual arts and in literature, from a masculine and heterosexual perspective that presents and represents women as sexual objects for the pleasure of the male viewer and men as powerful avatars.

It has been noted that video games tend to sexualize women more often than men, while male characters are not sexualized in most media at all. The sexualization of men in videogames is often used to undermine the critical analyses of how women is portrayed in the media. Furthermore, it has also been noted that while women sexualization is done as fan service and treats them as objects, the sexualization of male characters is done as a male power fantasy. Commenting on this topic, The Guardian's Keith Stuart argues that while female characters are presented as sex objects, male characters are usually portrayed as something for straight male gamers to aspire towards. Writing for Paste magazine, Dante Douglas argued that men's sexualization and sexuality in video games falls in one of three categories: power fantasy, gender performance, and fan interpretation, with the power fantasy type being the most prevalent out of the three.

Video game designer and industry activist Mattie Brice, writing for PopMatters, argues that a notable aspect of sexual objectification involves "emphasizing what is illegal/improper to show in public without crossing a line." For women, these would include drawing attention to their breasts. However, drawing attention to a man's chest is not viewed as improper, and thus, while male video game characters that act as power fantasies may have an exposed chest, they do not qualify as sex objects, or their portrayal as sexualization. Brice goes on to state that true sexualization of male characters in video games would entail emphasizing what is improper for men to show in public; having them wear "low-rise pants and underwear" and drawing attention to their bulge or buttocks.

According to a study conducted by Karen Dill and Kathryn P. Thill in 2005, around 39% of female characters in video games wear revealing clothes versus 8% of male characters. Moreover, only 1% of male characters have "sexualized figures", compared to 60% of female characters. The study also stated that male characters (83%) are more likely to be portrayed as aggressive than female characters (62%), holding that men are included within the stereotyping image of video game marketing.

==== Men as power fantasies ====
Like female characters in video games, male characters often have unrealistic body proportions, with "perfectly chiseled bodies and rippling muscles." This portrayal of men and their bodies, described as the "ideal hero form", has its roots in American superhero comics. However, this is not an attempt to turn them into sex objects, but rather to emphasize that they are "powerful and strong".

Regarding power fantasy, Douglas states that this is the most prevalent form of male sexualization in video games, describing it as the "Muscle-Bound Warrior Man". He points out that Kratos from the God of War franchise is a prominent example. The agency of Kratos and other examples of the "power fantasy" is one of the main differences from the sexualization of female characters. The male character's sexual exploits are not made for sexual arousal, but serve as avatars for the straight male gamers to showcase their strength through "conque[st]". These characters are characterized by their hypermasculinity.

==== Men as sexual objects ====
Brice argues that the main reason male characters are not sexualized as often as female characters is that many video games—and by extension, other media—are developed by heterosexual men, with the "neutral vision of game design" being influenced by the "socially appropriate interests specific to straight men". Since the "average straight guy avoid[s] appearing or feeling gay", male characters in games are usually not sexualized; the little sexualization that does occur, such as bare arms or an exposed chest, is done because it's viewed as "safe" for straight men.

When men are sexualized in a similar manner to women, this is usually done for comedic effect. Examples include the video game franchise Cho Aniki and Muscle March, which feature men in sexualized and homoerotic poses. However, this is done as part of the game's absurd humor rather than as true sexualization.

Regarding the treatment of men as sex objects, which he calls "gender performance," Douglas notes that due to the prevailing heteronormativity in video games, attributing "sexiness" to a character is intertwined with femininity. Because being sexy is also viewed as being submissive, this contrasts with the masculine ideal of being in control. For this reason, many male video game characters that are characterized as "sexy" and objects of desire are coded by including feminine traits; their vanity and attention to personal attire, and queer coding, usually for humorous purposes.

===== Bishōnen =====
Male characters with distinctly feminine traits often appear in East Asian video games, especially Japanese video games, as the Bishōnen archetype. These men distinguish themselves by grace and charm.

===== Examples =====
Chris Redfield, a prominent character in the Resident Evil franchise since the first game, had his appearance changed radically for Resident Evil 5 (2009), which included increased muscle mass. His redesign has been noted for being sexy, with the character described as a "beefcake". The Microsoft Windows release of the game included an alternate "Warrior" outfit for Chris, which has been described as a Mad Max-esque and "BDSM fetishi[sm]". For the updated HD version of Resident Evil: Revelations (2012), released in 2013, Chris was given an unlockable "Sailor" outfit which the game's writer Dai Satō describes as having "the shirt [be] a super tight fit" and includes "short trousers". According to artist Satoshi Takamatsu, the developers always have "difficulties with Chris' bonus costumes", but decided to use the Sailor one because it differed greatly from his normal outfit from the game. Chris' Sailor outfit received some positive responses, with South African website Game Zone describing it as "sexy" and that it makes him look like a member of the Village People. American horror website Bloody Disgusting, despite considering the Sailor Chris outfit one of the franchise's "silliest" costumes, also acknowledges its sex appeal, with IGN echoing similar statements.

Attention regarding male sexualization in video games has also been given to Kaidan Alenko from BioWare's Mass Effect series; especially his portrayal and potential romance in Mass Effect 3 (2012). In Chapter 1 of the book Digital Love: Romance and Sexuality in Games, Michelle Clough presented a case study which illustrated how the character is an example of the shifting portrayal of male sexualization in the original trilogy. While Kaidan is presented as a love interest for a female Shepard who is conventionally attractive and has an appealing personality in the first game, she noted that there was little acknowledgment of the physical aspect of his appeal, and, outside of a sex scene which mostly focuses on a female Shepard's body, little opportunity for the character to be appreciated in a sexual context. This is contrasted with Kaidan's more sexualized presentation in Mass Effect 3, where the character is shirtless in multiple scenes, and more emphasis is placed on the intimacy between him and Shepard. During one scene where Kaidan is reboarding the Normandy and still in a relationship with Shepard, the camera alternates quick cuts between a close up of Kaidan's buttocks and a close up of Shepard's gaze, indicating that she enjoys looking at him in a sexual way. Clough concluded that Kaidan's overall depiction in 3 framed him as a good choice for Shepard as a romantic and sexual partner.

A few playable male characters in Marvel Rivals (2024) have shown some form of sexualization along with the games female characters, such as Venom and (most recently and notably) Captain America. During an April fools event in 2025, Venom had been given a twerking emote, which spread considerable discussion and humour online. As of the games 2026 Summer Event, Captain America was provided a very tight one-piece swimsuit skin which featured a considerable bulge and display of the characters bottom, also sparking massive discussion and being labelled NSFW. The skin itself is described as have been modelled for gay men.

==== Male sexualization within fandom ====
Lastly, there is fan interpretation, where Douglas notes that some male characters, despite not adhering to the masculine physical ideal, are still viewed as attractive by the fanbase. These male characters tend to be more open with their emotions and are usually suave. Characters such as this—like Garrus Vakarian from the Mass Effect series—are usually side characters, rather than the player character. Fan interpretation is characterized by the male character's limitations and interactions with other characters within the story.

== Portrayal of LGBTQ characters ==
One common trope in video games is the portrayal of LGBTQ characters as one-dimensional stereotypes, such as overly effeminate gay men or butch lesbians. This type of representation can be harmful, as it perpetuates negative stereotypes and reinforces harmful gender norms. Additionally, many games have been criticized for including LGBTQ characters only as minor side characters rather than as fully-developed protagonists or central characters.

=== History ===
LGBTQ characters have been included in video games as early as the 1980s and 1990s. While there has been a trend towards greater representation of LGBT people in video games, they are frequently identified as LGBT in secondary material, such as comics, rather than in the games themselves.

In the history of video games, LGBT content has been subject to changing rules and regulations, which are generally examples of heterosexism, in that heterosexuality is normalized, while homosexuality is subject to additional censorship or ridicule. Companies Nintendo of America, Sega of America and Maxis policed the content of games with content codes in which LGBT themes were toned down or erased. Some Japanese video games, for instance, originally included trans characters, such as Birdo from Super Mario Bros. 2, Poison from the Final Fight series, and Flea from Chrono Trigger. Due to adherence to Nintendo of America's quality standards and translations based on preserving gameplay rather than literal meaning, these characters' identities were altered or erased in translation.

=== Prevalence ===
A 2024 survey by the LGBTQ advocacy organization GLAAD found that only around 2% of the games available in major digital game stores were labeled as containing LGBTQ content. In comparison, 29% of film characters (2023) or 11% of primetime TV characters (2022) were LGBTQ. The same survey found that 17% of the surveyed 1,452 US gamers identified as LGBTQ, significantly more than the 10% reported in a 2020 study, or estimates for the general US population.

The video game industry is regarded as having heteronormative bias by numerous analysts. According to industry professionals interviewed by Adrienne Shaw, reasons for this heteronormativity include the demographic of those who play games, the views of those who create games, the risk of backlash in the industry, and the storytelling limitations of the medium.

In games with LGBT characters or the option of an LGBT avatar, some aspects of marginalization that occur in contemporary culture are depicted regardless of the game's overall adherence to reality. These real social constraints are imposed on a virtual world due to the way games are constructed and the community that inhabits them. Games are made on contemporary culture's heteronormative basis, and this shapes narrative and characters. In the popular MMO World of Warcraft, for example, this has "created an oppressive atmosphere for individuals who do not adhere to a heteronormative lifestyle", according to a 2013 assessment of the game's community.

LGBT gamers use queer readings of media to compensate for their lack of representation in it. As concluded in a study by Moravec et al., this "imaginative play" is the most common method LGBT gamers use to relate to in-game avatars that are typically created for a presumed straight, male player to relate to.

=== Forms of LGBT representation ===
Choice-based LGBT content, such as optional same sex romance in BioWare games, is a low-risk form of representation that occurs only in video games. When representation is included, it is often through these in-game choices, which place the responsibility for representation on players instead of developers. Because they afford the most opportunity for player choice and in game romance, genres such as RPGs and MMOs are the most LGBT representative. Another low-risk method of LGBT representation in games is "gay window gaming," which is LGBT representation that is either subtle or avoidable, serving to appeal to LGBT players without alienating straight or homophobic players. This can occur in sandbox games such as The Sims.

Both members of the industry and LGBT players prefer LGBT representation to be normalized in game narratives rather than made to seem abnormal or special.

Sexual orientation and gender identity have served a significant role in some video games, with the trend being toward greater visibility of LGBT identities. Speaking on the Ubisoft blog, Lucien Soulban, who is openly gay and was the writer for Far Cry 3: Blood Dragon, said that openly gay or lesbian characters would not appear in video games for a long while as anything other than a one-off or something that was created through user choice as seen in the Mass Effect and Dragon Age games. The character of Dorian Pavus in Dragon Age: Inquisition was regarded as a significant development for the portrayal of gay characters in games, in that his homosexuality informs plot elements that occur regardless of whether the player decides to interact with him romantically.

Some games have faced backlash for their portrayal of LGBTQ+ characters, such as the controversy surrounding the character Hainly Abrams in Mass Effect: Andromeda, who was criticized for her stereotypical representation and for being voiced by a cisgender actor. The game Cyberpunk 2077 also faced criticism for its portrayal of transgender characters, with some arguing that the game's portrayal was insensitive and perpetuated harmful stereotypes.

==== Lesbian characters and the male gaze ====
The representation of lesbian characters in media, including video games, has often been influenced by the male gaze, which can lead to problematic and objectifying portrayals. In video games, lesbian characters have often been depicted through the male gaze, as a way to appeal to a heterosexual male audience. This can result in the objectification of lesbian characters, as their relationships and identities are reduced to sexual fantasies for male players.

One common trope in video games is the depiction of lesbian characters as overly sexualized and for the pleasure of male players. This can be seen in games such as Mortal Kombat, which features female characters in revealing clothing and suggestive poses. While some of these characters are explicitly identified as lesbians, their sexuality is often used to further objectify them and make them appealing to male players.

Another issue with the representation of lesbian characters in video games is the lack of agency and depth given to their relationships. In some games, lesbian characters are presented as one-dimensional and their relationships are not fully developed. This can contribute to the harmful stereotype that lesbian relationships are solely about sexual attraction and do not involve emotional connections or depth.

==== Trends towards positive representation ====
There has been a significant and progressive trend towards representation and inclusion of LGBTQ+ characters and themes in the world of video games. Notable examples of this positive trend can be seen in characters like Ellie from The Last of Us series, a lesbian and the main protagonist of the games, and Tracer from Overwatch, a lesbian character who has gained immense popularity within the gaming community. Another example is Krem, a transgender man from Dragon Age: Inquisition, who was praised for his positive portrayal and for being voiced by a trans man. Increased representation has been welcomed by the LGBTQ+ community.

Another example is the popular game Life Is Strange, which features a main character, Max, who is bisexual. Max's sexuality is an important aspect of her character development, and the game explores the challenges she faces as a result of her sexuality.

Another example is the inclusion of a transgender character in the game Tell Me Why, developed by Dontnod Entertainment. The game's protagonist, Tyler, is a transgender man, and the game explores his experiences and struggles with his gender identity. The game was praised for its positive portrayal of a transgender character and for its nuanced exploration of gender identity. By presenting Tyler as a fully realized character with his own hopes, fears, and aspirations, the game humanizes the transgender experience and helps foster empathy and understanding among players.

=== Representation in the games industry ===
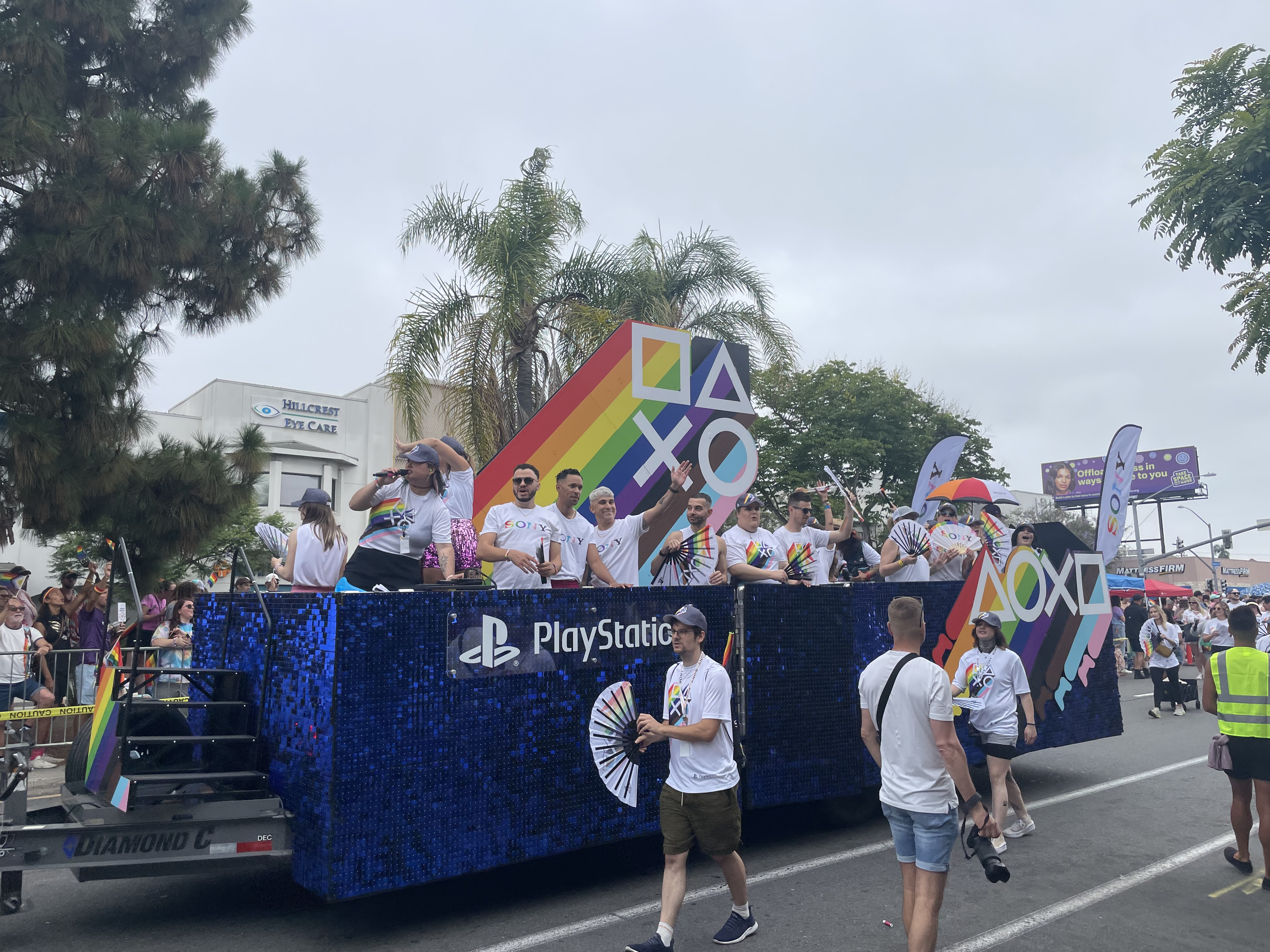
Playstation employees on a float at the San Diego Pride Parade

There has been a growing movement to enhance LGBTQ+ representation in the realm of video games. To further improve LGBTQ+ representation in the video game industry, several initiatives and organizations have emerged in recent years.

One notable example is the International Game Developers Association (IGDA), which has established a dedicated special interest group for LGBTQ+ game developers. This group serves as a resource and support network for LGBTQ+ professionals working in the industry. The IGDA also organizes an annual LGBTQ+ in Gaming Summit. "Queerly Represent Me" is a nonprofit organization dedicated to promoting and supporting the inclusion of LGBTQ+ characters and themes in video games.

Recognizing the growing inclusion of LGBT characters and themes in video games, GLAAD introduced the "Outstanding Video Game Award" category at its 30th GLAAD Media Awards.

== Effect of gender representation in games ==
=== Effect on attitudes towards gender ===
A 2008 study found that males reported playing more violent video games than females. This exposure was negatively correlated with men's certainty in their judgements when presented with a scenario of possible sexual harassment selected for its ambiguity. The exposure to violent video games was also correlated with attitudes supportive of rape.

=== Effect on children ===
Canadian non-profit MediaSmarts writes that "video games have the potential to influence how children perceive themselves and others", but, despite their impact on the youth, "there is not a lot of research available in this area, and few of the existing studies stand up to critical examination. This lack of scrutiny means that we know very little about the effects that video games may have on children's development and socialization."

According to Tracy L. Dietz, video game characters have the potential to shape players' perceptions of gender roles. Through social comparison processes, players learn societal expectations of appearances, behaviors and roles. Girls may expect that they be dependent victims and that their responsibilities include maintaining beauty and sexual appeal, while boys may determine that their role is to protect and defend women. Thus, Dietz writes, the roles internalized by the child, including gender, become for the child, and later for the adult, a basis for other roles and for action. The gender roles internalized by young individuals have a significant impact on their perspectives and the additional roles they assume in later life. Feminine and masculine symbols are supposed to become a part of a child's identity.

==== Gender stereotypes ====
Sexist video games often reinforce gender stereotypes by presenting gender-specific themes and activities. Games marketed exclusively to girls often involve fashion, make-up, caregiving, or relationship management, while games aimed at boys focus on action, sports, cars, and competition. This approach perpetuates the notion that certain interests and activities are suitable for specific genders, limiting the range of experiences and reinforcing traditional gender roles.

For example, "Fashion Designer" or "Makeover" games targeted at girls emphasize appearance and reinforce societal expectations of beauty standards, suggesting that girls should prioritize their appearance and adhere to traditional feminine ideals. On the other hand, "Racing", "Shooter", or "Math" games aimed at boys emphasize aggression, risk-taking, competitiveness, and logic, reinforcing stereotypes of male dominance, strength, and stoicism.

==== Narrow representation and lack of diversity ====
Sexist video games that target specific genders often feature narrow representations and lack diversity in characters and narratives. By limiting the experiences and perspectives represented in these games, they contribute to the marginalization of underrepresented genders and reinforce the idea that gaming is primarily for one gender.

For instance, games exclusively targeted at girls may depict predominantly white, thin, and conventionally attractive female characters, excluding diverse body types, ethnicities, and experiences. This lack of representation sends a message that girls who do not fit these narrow standards are not valued or important in gaming.

==== Impact on self-perception and identity ====
Gender-specific video games can have a significant impact on children's self-perception and identity development. When games reinforce gender-specific interests and activities, children may internalize these messages, feeling pressured to conform to traditional gender roles and expectations. This can lead to self-limiting beliefs and restrict their exploration of diverse interests and talents.

For example, girls who primarily play games focused on beauty and fashion may come to believe that their value lies solely in their appearance, potentially impacting their self-esteem and limiting their aspirations. Similarly, boys who exclusively engage in games emphasizing aggression and competition may perceive these traits as essential for their masculinity, potentially reinforcing toxic behaviors and limiting their emotional expression.

==== Social influences ====
Gender roles in video games can influence children's social behavior and interactions with others. Children may learn gender-specific social skills and behaviors from video games that can affect their relationships with peers and adults. For example, games portraying male characters as aggressive and dominant may encourage boys to exhibit similar behaviors in their interactions. In contrast, games that depict female characters as cooperative and empathetic may encourage girls to adopt similar behaviors in their social interactions. These gendered socialization processes can perpetuate gender inequality and limit children's ability to develop healthy relationships with individuals of different genders.

The impact of gender roles in video games is not limited to reinforcing stereotypes and objectifying women. Video games can also have an impact on children's attitudes towards gender and gender identity. For example, a study published by Tracy L. Dietz about "Gender Socialization and Aggressive Behavior" found that playing video games with gender-nonconforming characters led to increased acceptance of non-traditional gender roles among children. This suggests that video games have the potential to be a positive influence on children's attitudes towards gender identity and gender expression.

Gender roles in video games can have implications for children's academic and career aspirations. Research has shown that children's exposure to gender stereotypes in media can impact their career choices and academic performance. Video games that reinforce gender stereotypes and limit representations of diverse gender identities can limit children's exposure to alternative career paths and opportunities. Additionally, children may internalize gender stereotypes that impact their academic performance, leading to lower self-esteem, reduced motivation, and underachievement in academic settings.

=== Toxic masculinity in video games: influence on children ===
Many video games depict male characters that embody characteristics of toxic masculinity, namely, excessive aggression and violence. These portrayals often serve as influential figures for players, particularly children, who may internalize and emulate their behavior. In a 2000 study, exposure to violent video games featuring hyper-masculine characters was associated with a notable increase in aggressive thoughts, emotions, and actions among children and adolescents.

While the Pokémon franchise as a whole promotes friendship, teamwork, and perseverance, some aspects of the games can perpetuate gender stereotypes. For instance, certain Pokémon are designed with exaggerated masculine traits, reinforcing the idea that physical strength and aggression are defining characteristics of masculinity.

Although primarily targeting mature audiences, the popularity of the Call of Duty series among children cannot be ignored. The competitive multiplayer modes often emphasize aggression, dominance, and even toxic behavior such as trash-talking or belittling opponents. This can contribute to the normalization of toxic masculinity within the gaming community.

=== Effects of sexualized content on players ===
A 2022 meta-analysis examined empirical evidence of whether or not sexualized content in video games correlated with body dissatisfaction, or if it resulted in more sexist or misogynistic behavior. It found that neither body dissatisfaction or sexist/misogynistic behavior correlated with sexualized content in video games. The study also determined that the better the study was designed, the less of a correlation was present.

== Players' preferences ==
Although games that included the option of selecting a female hero obtained better review scores, they sold fewer copies than games with exclusively male protagonists: Penny Arcade Report attributed the difference to larger marketing budgets for games with male heroes. Games with a female-only protagonist had, on average, only 50% of the marketing budget of female-optional games, and 40% of the marketing budget of games with male-only protagonists. Male-only games included popular sports and war franchises such as Madden NFL and Call of Duty, and EEDAR's Jesse Divnich stated in 2010, "The factors that drive sales are based more on brand licensing, marketing budgets, development budget and a thousand other factors that have little to do with the gender of playable avatars."

A 2013 study showed that box art depicting sexualized female characters in non-central roles positively affected sales.

Polling in 2015 by the Pew Research Center showed 16% of adults who play video games believe most games portray women poorly, compared to 26% who disagree, and 34% who say it depends on the game. Among those who do not play, 55% are unsure if games portray women poorly. Minimal differences were seen between male and female responses.

A 2015 survey of 1,583 US students aged 11 to 18 by Rosalind Wiseman and Ashly Burch indicated that 60% of girls but only 39% of boys preferred to play a character of their own gender, and 28% of girls as opposed to 20% of boys said that they were more likely to play a game based on the character's gender. The authors interpreted this as meaning that the gaming industry's focus on male protagonists stifled sales to girls more than it promoted sales to boys.

In a 2017 survey of 1,266 gamers by Quantic Foundry, 89% of female gamers considered the inclusion of female protagonist option in games as being somewhat, very or extremely important; 64% of male gamers expressed the same views. Self-identified "hardcore" gamers of all genders, on average, considered a female protagonist less important than "core" or "casual" gamers did.

Sexualization of female characters is a concern of gamers of all sexes. Players, including male and female players, do not always prefer or appreciate a sexualised design for female characters. In a 2020 survey of 2,006 gamers by Bryter, 62% of female gamers and 50% of male gamers felt that female characters are often oversexualised in games.

== 2000s quantitative overview ==
This section provides an overview of the findings of the quantitative results of various studies into gender representation in video games during the 2000s.

Characteristics of video game characters
Authors	Year	Sample	Characteristic	Subcharacteristic	Male characters	Female characters	Notes
Ivory	2006	GameSpot’s reviews of the 100 top-rated games in 2004	Prevalence		75%	42%	By mentions in the articles
Miller / Summers	2007	49 articles in Xbox, PlayStation, and Nintendo Power magazines, 2003 to 2005	Prevalence		84%	16%	By mentions in the articles
Miller / Summers	2007	49 articles in Xbox, PlayStation, and Nintendo Power magazines, 2003 to 2005	Sexualization	Sexiness	1.15	4.29	Average on a scale from 0 to 7
Miller / Summers	2007	49 articles in Xbox, PlayStation, and Nintendo Power magazines, 2003 to 2005	Sexualization	Attractiveness	3.22	5.00	Average on a scale from 0 to 7
Miller / Summers	2007	49 articles in Xbox, PlayStation, and Nintendo Power magazines, 2003 to 2005	Narrative attributes	Powerful	5.10	3.51	Average on a scale from 0 to 7
Miller / Summers	2007	49 articles in Xbox, PlayStation, and Nintendo Power magazines, 2003 to 2005	Narrative attributes	Army attire	30.6%	7.5%	

== See also ==
- Gamergate controversy, concerning harassment towards people discussing gender issues in gaming.
- Media and gender
- Portrayal of women in American comics
- Sex and nudity in video games
- Sexual harassment in video gaming
- Race and video games
- LGBTQ themes in Western animation
- LGBTQ themes in anime and manga
