= Rhiannon Software =

Defunct American developer of girls' video games

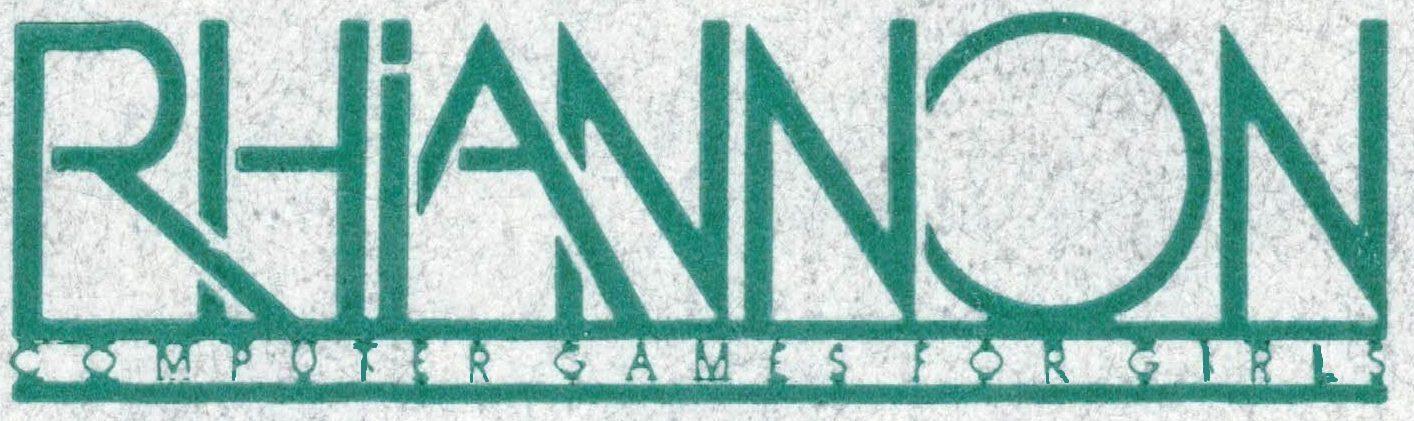
- Company type: Private
- Industry: Educational Computer Games
- Founded: June 1982; 43 years ago
- Founder: Elizabeth Stott and Lucy Ewell
- Defunct: June 1986
- Headquarters: Richmond, Virginia, U.S.
- Key people: Elizabeth Stott and Lucy Ewell - Owners and Designers, Ken Hollis programmer, Helen O'Boyle Programmer
- Products: Jenny of the Prairie (1983), Cave Girl Clair (1984), Chelsea of the South Sea Islands (1984), Lauren of the 25th Century(1985), Kristen and Her Family (1985), Sarah and her Friends (1985)

Rhiannon Software was an American developer of girls' video games based in Richmond, Virginia. Its games were targeted at girls between the ages of 7 and 12. The company was founded by Elizabeth Stott and Lucy Ewell. They created the games because they saw a need for a strong female protagonist that encouraged young girls to explore computers.

The initial design of the games were the brainchild of Elizabeth Stott and Lucy Ewell. They were friends that saw the need to encourage young girls to use computers. They decided to "do something about the problem of girls and computers", wanting to address the emerging issue of equity in computer access. They decided to write an adventure game oriented towards young girls. They designed the layouts and 'story' for each of the games in the Rhiannon Software series. A programmer, Ken Hollis, wrote the software for Jenny of the Prairie to bring their vision to life on an Apple II computer. Helen O'Boyle then took over to write Cave Girl Claire using the creative story Elizabeth and Lucy had written. Chelsea of the South Sea Islands came out shortly thereafter, based on the same software as Cave Girl Claire, but with a different storyline.

== Works ==
- Jenny of the Prairie (1983)
- Cave Girl Clair (1984)
- Chelsea of the South Sea Islands (1984)
- Lauren of the 25th Century (1985)
- Kristen and Her Family (1985)
- Sarah and her Friends (1985)
