= Jamin Warren =

American video game executive

- Born: 1983 (age 42–43)
- Occupations: co-founder and chief executive of Kill Screen
- Known for: Kill Screen

Jamin Warren (born 1983) is co-founder and chief executive of Kill Screen, a video game arts and culture company that The New Yorker called "the McSweeney's of interactive media". He was formerly the host of the PBS webseries Game/Show (2013-2016). Warren also founded Twofivesix, a marketing agency preparing brands for the future of play and interactivity.

== Education ==
Warren graduated from Harvard in 2004.

== Career ==
=== Journalism ===
Warren has previously written for Pitchfork and the Wall Street Journal. He's drawn notice for his gaming-related culture commentary on topics like net neutrality, race and gender in gaming, and virtual reality. He was a 2016 Webby nominee for Online Film & Video: Gaming (Channel) for his work on PBS Game/Show.

=== Kill Screen ===
In 2009, Warren co-founded, with Chris Dahlen, a video-gaming magazine called Kill Screen, funding the initial issue of the related magazine via Kickstarter. Warren now oversees Kill Screen magazine (with video game reviews Time called "so smart and polished that they might help convince doubters that games are worth taking seriously") and hosts events like the annual two5six gaming conference, a pop-up arcade at the Museum of Modern Art, and a virtual reality conference at the New Museum. In 2016, Warren launched a collaboration between Kill Screen and eyewear company Warby Parker, pairing a new video game called "Worbs" with limited-edition Kill Screen-branded frames from Warby Parker. The New York Observer said, "Worbs is a physics-based game with a major focus on simple graphics, which is quite closely with Warby Parker’s aesthetic for optics and sunglasses. It also falls in line with Kill Screen’s main goal, which is to locate the 'intersection between games, play, and other seats of culture, from art to music to design.'"

== Personal life ==
Warren lives in Los Angeles.
