= Kill Screen =

Online magazine

- Issue 9, the first redesigned Kill Screen issue after a successful Kickstarter campaign
- Categories: Video games
- Founder: Jamin Warren; Chris Dahlen
- Founded: 2009; 17 years ago
- First issue: March 2010; 16 years ago
- Final issue: 2016; 10 years ago (print)
- Company: Kill Screen Media, Inc.
- Country: United States
- Based in: New York City
- Language: English
- Website: killscreen.com
- OCLC: 892699658

Kill Screen is an online magazine founded in 2009 by Jamin Warren and Chris Dahlen and owned by Kill Screen Media, Inc. It focused on video games and culture, but also included articles based on entertainment. The name is based on the video game term of the same name.

In 2009, both Warren and Dahlen were former writers for Pitchfork when they decided to found the magazine. After a successful Kickstarter campaign to fund the magazine, the first issue was released in March 2010. After partnerships with Pitchfork, StoryCode and Film Society of Lincoln Center, the magazine eventually founded an annual video game conference, two5six, in 2013. The magazine's website did a redesign in January 2014 and the print magazine itself was redesigned and overhauled after a second successful Kickstarter campaign in November 2015. In 2016, two5six's name was changed to Kill Screen Festival.

From 2009 to 2016, it was also published in print. After 2016, Kill Screen ceased publication, and its website went defunct around the same time. The site was relaunched in 2020 with a new editorial approach. Subsequent to this, it was known as Killscreen.

== Overview ==
Kill Screen was a print and online magazine that specialized in literary video games journalism. The magazine originally planned to publish think pieces rather than breaking news. PSFK described the magazine's demographic as "25–34-year-old wealthy, urban, culturally elite males". Some of the magazine's authors had previously written for The New Yorker, GQ, Los Angeles Times, The Onion and The Daily Show.

== History ==
The magazine was founded by Jamin Warren and Chris Dahlen, who both wrote for Pitchfork (Pitchfork partnered with Kill Screen in 2011 to republish some articles on their website). In a discussion at the March 2009 Game Developers Conference, the two discussed the lack of "high-end, intellectual" magazines about video games and non-blog writers in the style of Tom Wolfe and Chuck Klosterman. Brophy-Warren and Dahlen decided to start Kill Screen. They sought for the magazine to mirror what Rolling Stone and Wired established in their respective industries. Anthony Smyrski of Swindle served as the magazine's creative director. The magazine's authors had previously written for The New Yorker, GQ, Los Angeles Times, The Onion, and The Daily Show. The magazine was originally crowdfunded through Kickstarter in late 2009. The print magazine was redesigned in 2015.

=== Kill Screen Festival ===
Kill Screen Festival, formerly known as two5six, was an annual game developers conference organized by Warren from 2013 to 2016. The conference was announced on 20 March 2013 on Vimeo, which was filmed at The Invisible Dog Art Center. Within the 2015 two5six festival, Kill Screen introduced Game Academy, an event workshop where participants who had little-to-no knowledge of code could learn. Intel sponsored some workshops and provided "game scholars", those experienced in programming. It also expanded to include a film festival, effectively making the festival two days longer.

== Reception ==
The New Yorker praised Kill Screen for its intuitiveness and described it as "the McSweeney's of interactive media". PSFK called Kill Screen a "novel and elegant twist on modern publishing" with the feel of Monocle and impressive design and writers, and compared it as "Rolling Stone was to rock'n'roll or what Wired was to tech". Time compared the magazine to Salon, but for video games and rated it among the best magazines/blogs of 2011 and praised their review of L.A. Noire, stating that it could help legitimize the video games medium. Ars Technica praised the magazine's layout and composition for its price, stating that "the dives are deeper, the writing is thoughtful, and the presentation and custom art for each story makes the experience of reading these stories about our hobby a sensual experience." Engadget stated the magazine avoiding "the mechanical nitty-gritty that plagues game writing."
