= Purple Moon =

Defunct American developer of girls' video games

- Company type: Private
- Founded: November 1996; 29 years ago
- Founder: Brenda Laurel
- Defunct: February 1999
- Fate: Assets purchased by Mattel
- Headquarters: Mountain View, California, U.S.
- Key people: Nancy Deyo (chief executive); Brenda Laurel, vice president for design Kristee Rosendahl, webmaster Pamela Dell, story director
- Number of employees: 40 (1999)

Purple Moon was an American developer of girls' video games based in Mountain View, California. Its games were targeted at girls between the ages of 8 and 14. The company was founded by Brenda Laurel and others, and supported by Interval Research. They debuted their first two games, Rockett's New School and Secret Paths in the Forest, in 1997. Both games were more or less visual novels and encouraged values like friendship and decision making. Purple Moon's games were part of a larger girl games movement in the 1990s, initiated largely by the surprise success of Mattel's 1996 CD-ROM game Barbie Fashion Designer.

Laurel based her game design on four years of interview research she had done at Interval.

An associated website, purple-moon.com, featured characters from the games and allowed users to trade virtual items. Some items arose from brand partnerships with companies such as Bonne Bell and SeaWorld. Children were required to have parental consent (email or verbal) in order to register on the site.

Purple Moon's games faced some criticism such as claims that they perpetuated gender stereotypes and ethnic stereotypes.

The company folded in spring of 1999 and was bought out by Mattel, creators of Barbie, one of the most famous and well-known franchises aimed at young girls. Mattel kept Purple Moon's website running for a while but did not develop any further products.

In a 2009 interview, Laurel said that "In a way, the need for the kind of cultural intervention we made with Purple Moon no longer exists, in that girls and women are full participants in the world of computer-based interactivity, but we still have a problem with female designers getting their work out there. And there are many genres and areas of interest for girls and women that remain untouched. Heroes like Tracy Fullerton (USC), danah boyd (now at Microsoft, I believe), Justine Cassell (Northwestern) and Henry Jenkins (founder of the Comparative Media Studies program at MIT and moving now to USC) keep the flame burning for women in gaming."

== Works ==
Rockett series

- Rockett's New School
- Rockett's Tricky Decision
- Rockett's Secret Invitation
- Rockett’s First Dance
- Rockett's Adventure Maker
- Rockett's Camp Adventures

Secret Paths series

- Secret Paths in the Forest
- Secret Paths to the Sea
- Secret Paths to Your Dreams

Other games

- Starfire Soccer Challenge
