= Rockett's Tricky Decision =

Invention Studio
- Developer: Presage Software
- Publisher: Purple Moon
- Platforms: Windows; Macintosh
- Release: February 1998
- Genre: Adventure

Rockett's Tricky Decision is a 1998 adventure video game developed by Presage Software and published by Purple Moon. It is for ages 8 and up.

== Gameplay ==
Rockett must choose between two Halloween parties, and the player guides her through branching scenes that play out like an interactive movie. At each decision point, the player selects one of three emotional responses—happy, angry, or ambivalent—each triggering a different line from Rockett. Choices can be reversed if the outcome is not preferred. Between story segments, the player may explore a secret hallway containing lockers, the teacher's lounge, and the school newspaper room. Twenty lockers can be checked, and their contents change over time. The player's decisions shape Rockett's path and determine which party she ultimately attends.

== Development ==
Presage Software developed the Macintosh, Windows, and Windows95 versions of Rockett's Tricky Decision. Rockett's Tricky Decision was released in February 1998.

== Reception ==
Reception

Review score
Publication	Score
The Houston Chronicle	A

Computer Shopper called Rockett’s Tricky Decision highly entertaining overall. MacAddict liked the animations in Rockett’s Tricky Decision.
