= Hypermasculinity =

Exaggeration of male stereotypical behaviour

Hypermasculinity is a psychological and sociological term for the exaggeration of male stereotypical behavior, such as an emphasis on physical strength, aggression, and human male sexuality. In the field of clinical psychology, this term has been used ever since the publication of research by Donald L. Mosher and Mark Sirkin in 1984. Mosher and Sirkin operationally define hypermasculinity or the "macho personality" as consisting of three variables:

- Callous sexual attitudes toward women
- The belief that violence is manly
- The experience of danger as exciting

They developed the Hypermasculinity Inventory (HMI) designed to measure the three components. Research has found that hypermasculinity is associated with sexual and physical aggression towards women and towards perceived gay men. Prisoners have higher hypermasculinity scores than control groups.

== Emotion ==
Both the outward physical aspects and the emotive characteristics that define those men deemed "hypermasculine" have been studied. Hypermasculine attitudes can also include emotional self-control as a sign of toughness. To be emotionally hardened or indifferent, especially toward women, is to display what Thomas Scheff calls "character" – composure and impassiveness in times of great stress or emotion. Of this hypermasculine stoicism, Scheff observes, "it is masculine men that have 'character'. A man with character who is under stress is not going to cry and blubber like a woman or child might."

Self-imposed emotional monitoring by men has also greatly affected the conditions in which they communicate with women. Ben-Zeev, Scharnetzki, Chan and Dennehy (2012) write of a recent study that has shown many men to deliberately avoid behaviours and attitudes such as compassion and emotional expression, deeming these traits feminine and thus rejecting them altogether. Scheff adds, "The hypermasculine pattern leads to competition, rather than connection between persons." In the context of intimate or emotional communication (especially confrontation) with women, the masculine male often withdraws emotionally, refusing to engage in what is termed affective communication (Scheff). In a similar study of affective communication behaviours, gender contrast – the deliberate or subconscious negation by one sex of the behaviours of the other – was far more evident within the young boys used as test subjects than of the girls.

Where this insistence on emotional indifference manifests in the physical definitions of hyper masculinity is discussed by Scheff: "Repressing love and the vulnerable emotions (grief, fear and shame, the latter as in feelings of rejection or disconnection) leads to either silence or withdrawal, on the one hand, or acting out anger (flagrant hostility), on the other. The composure and poise of hypermasculinity seems to be a recipe for silence and violence."

== In visual media ==
Ben-Zeev, Scharnetzki, Chan and Dennehy point toward images in the media as the most important factor influencing hypermasculine behaviour, stating "After all, media does not only reflect cultural norms but can and does transform social reality". This is based on the fact that physical and emotional elements of hypermasculine behaviour are manifested regularly in advertising, Hollywood film, and even in video games through the use of very strong imagery: muscular men overpowering women in advertisements, actors portraying staunch male characters who do not give in to the emotional appeals of their female counterparts and countless video games whose story lines are based strictly on violence. The constant availability of these images for every-day public viewing and use has indeed paved the way for the construction of a system of re-enactment (consciously or unconsciously) by both men and women, of the values they perpetuate (Ben-Zeev et al.).

In the gaming industry, hypermasculinity is experienced mainly through the fantastic and often violent situations presented in the gameplay, and as well by the typical design and character traits of the playable characters: often powerfully built, bold and full of bravado and usually armed. "The choice of female characters and actions within games leaves women with few realistic, non-sexualized options", while female characters, like Lara Croft, are sometimes criticized as illusions of female empowerment, who instead serve only to satisfy the gaze of men (see Gender representation in video games).

Hypermasculine styles in gay male culture are prominent in gay disco groups of the 1970s such as Village People, and are reflected in the BDSM gay subculture depicted in the film Cruising (1980). The term "hypermasculine" also characterizes a style of erotic art in which male figures' muscles and penis/testicles are portrayed as being unrealistically large and prominent. Gay artists who exploit hypermasculine types include Tom of Finland and Gengoroh Tagame.

An article titled "Marketing Manhood in a 'Post-Feminist' Age" by Kristen Barber and Tristan Bridges also highlights the existence of hypermasculine traits in advertising. Old Spice, a predominantly male hygiene brand, used an image of Isaiah Mustafa in a tub dressed as a cowboy with the slogan "Make Sure Your Man Smells Like a Man" to advertise for their products. Both Barber and Bridges find that the ad is problematic because of the subliminal support for the idea that a distinct so-called masculine scent exists and the fact that it seeks to perpetuate stereotypical male characteristics. The advertisement also strategically dresses Mustafa as a cowboy to represent a hardworking, rough man in an attempt to create a greater appeal towards men to look and smell like him.

== Effect on women ==
The media's influence in creating gendered behaviours operates strongly upon women. In the same way that male consumers seek to conform to the physical and emotional characteristics predicated by stereotypes in visual media, so too do women tend to fall into the trap of conforming to the imagined social norms. Only, the media encourages them to fulfill the roles of the submissive and subservient women depicted in advertisements and commercials; in other words, the system pressures women to assume their roles as the focal points of the violence and sexual callousness of men. "Advertisements depicting men as violent (particularly towards women) is disturbing, because gender portrayals in advertisements do more than sell products. They also perpetuate stereotypes and present behavioural norms for men and women."

== Effect on men ==
Societal expectations have propagated the formation of gender roles between what is deemed masculine and feminine. However, these gender roles can have a negative impact on men and their mental well-being. If a man is unable to meet the designated masculine criteria, this can frequently lead to feelings of insecurity, inferiority, and general psychological distress. Some may also believe that an inability to live up to a certain gender role may jeopardise their social capital in their own communities.

== Effect on race ==
Scholars assert that colonizers' perception of the colonial black subject as an uncivilized, primitive, "irrational nonsubject" served as justification for the traumas inflicted on them, and that the legacy of such a perception is still evident in today's society. As a means of resistance, black men project hyper-masculinity in order to combat the feelings of powerlessness that are imposed on them by an "abusive and repressive" society. However, this merging of black identity and masculinity has "overdetermine[d] the identities black males are allowed to fashion for themselves", perpetuating negative stereotypes of all black men as inherently violent and dangerous. Likewise, other scholars argue that this treatment of black masculinity as an adaptive response privileges White, middle-class masculinity as simply "masculinity": "Ultimately, this places White masculinity at the center of the definition of ideal masculinity and reduces Black masculinity to a flawed circus-mirror reflection of it."

This continued stereotype of aggression and hyper-masculinity is due to the environment in which young African American males are raised. Adolescents raised in distressed communities are more inclined to adhere to violence and this is due to the multiple factors that coerce violence in these communities. These factors support the notion of community violence, being exposed continuously to the use of guns, knives, and drugs. Research has shown that between 45% and 96% of African American youth that live in urban areas have seen community violence from assault to murder. This continuous exposure to violence brings a normality of the idea that aggression supports authority. This sense of a need to hold authority is a crucial development that leads to hyper-masculinity in black men.

Other than the environment, another imperative factor to a child's growth are the parents or adults that surround them. These relationships are measured by social capital which is the amount of time parents spend with their children, how close they are to each other, and anything that is given to the children that will increase their social development. One main factor that decides a child's relationship and view of authority is based on the parents' strictness. This strictness is shown by parents controlling their sons and enforcing an expectation of masculinity. For example, expecting them not to cry, to deal with problems themselves and even forcing them to play sports. Young black men that were raised in a strict environment tend to have done better in school and socially, but they also tend to believe they have more authority as they grow older, especially as a man. It is a stereotype that African American families lean towards being more strict than others. This parenting strategy of being strict or harder on young African American boys causes them to suppress their emotions due to this misguided notion that this makes them more of a man. For example, famous actor Will Smith raises his sons in an unorthodox way. He treats his children equally to any other adult which reduces the amount of authority they seek and the amount of masculinity his sons feel they need. A quote from the famous artist Donald Glover describes the anger that many black males hold for their own hyper-masculinity. He says “Black men struggle with masculinity so much. The idea that we must always be strong really presses us all down – it keeps us from growing.”

In his 2002 book Soul Babies: Black Popular Culture and the Post-Soul Aesthetic, Mark Anthony Neal states that black masculinity became synonymous with a unified black identity during the Civil Rights Movement. Neal claims that the hyper-masculinity translated as violence within the black community to protect from violence directed at the black community from white America. Black gays and women were sometimes censured outright in an effort to merge black identity with masculinity. Huey P. Newton, in an effort to improve ties, wrote an essay to advocate for a stronger alliance between black political organizations and the women and gay members of their community. In it, he admitted that this popularity of hypermasculinity drives a tendency towards violence and silencing of women and gay men, which didn't permit these marginalized members to become a part of the black identity.

== See also ==
- Gender role
- Hegemonic masculinity
- Hypomasculinity
- Machismo
- Male privilege
- Manosphere
- Masculinism
- Masculinity
- Toxic masculinity
- Virility
