= Hypomasculinity =

Absence of stereotypical male traits

Hypomasculinity is a sociological and psychological term for the absence of stereotypical male traits. For example, it is the absence of the de-emphasising of feelings and relationships. Oftentimes, individuals who exhibit hypomasculine traits display unmasculine professional or physical characteristics that deviate from the norm.

A Jungian interpretation of this would be of an overwhelmingly strong anima or female complex. This term can be pejorative and it is important not to place a moral interpretation on whether it is desirable, only by whether it is adaptive or maladaptive. Its opposite behavior is termed hypermasculinity.

== Social Construction and Context ==
Hypomasculinity can be understood in relation to a broader gender construct presented by R. W. Connell and James Messerschmidt . Within their theoretical framework for masculinity studies, hegemonic masculinity represents the culturally dominant idea of "manhood". Other ideas like subordinated, marginalized, hypomasculinity, or non-hegemonic masculinities are described in contrast to it. These non-hegemonic categories are described with similar traits or behaviors that do not conform to dominant masculine norms (hegenomic masculinity). Masculinities are explained to be socially constructed and context dependent , meaning hypomasculinity varies across culture, society, and historical settings. Hypomasculinity is defined by social experiences that are labeled as "less masculine".

== See also ==
- Gender role
- Hypermasculinity
- Machismo
- Masculinity
- Virility
