= CyberVision 2001 =

1978 home computer

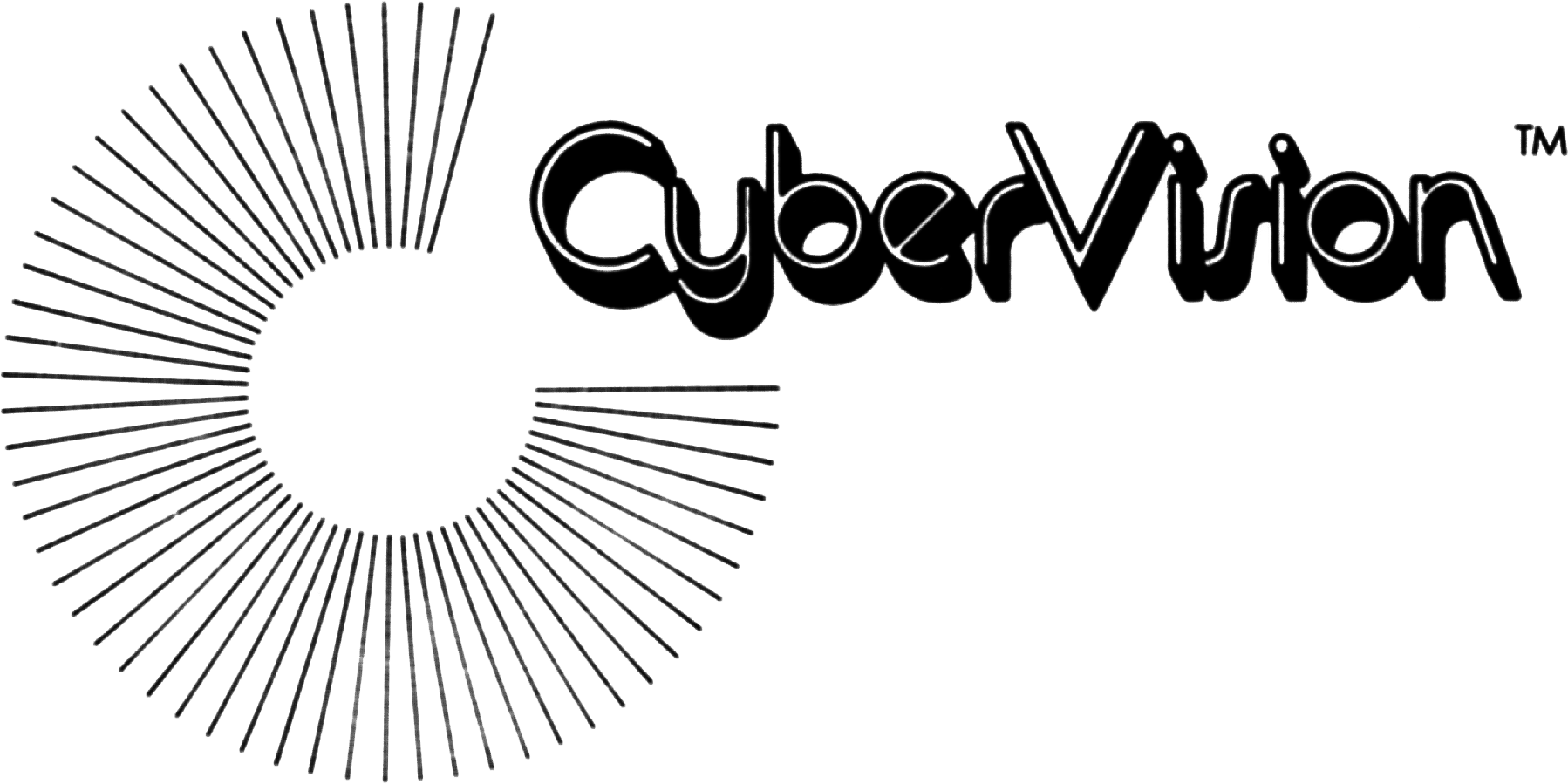

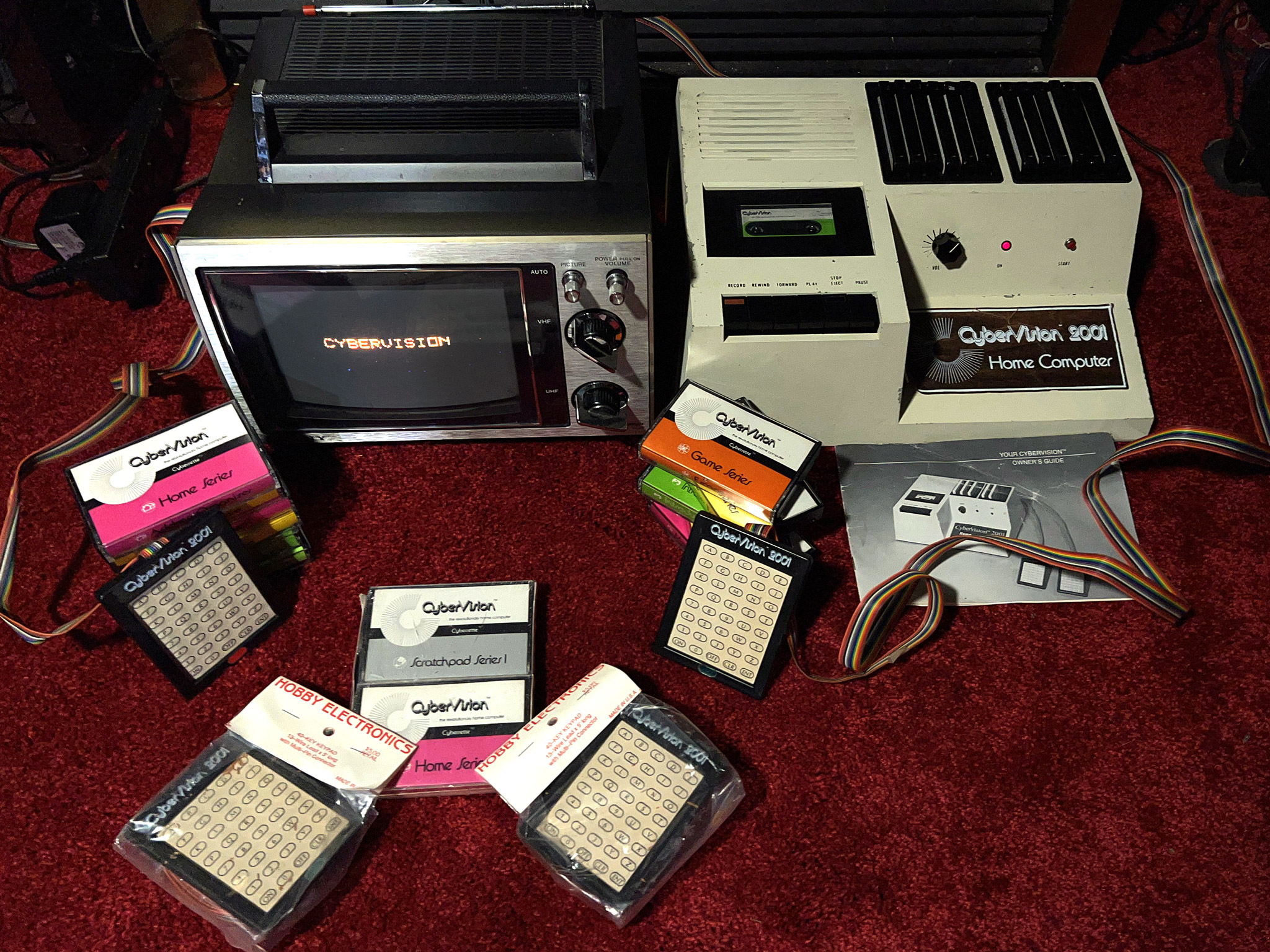
- Functional CyberVision 2001 displaying the default load screen, 40-button controllers and cassette-based media.
- Developer: The Authorship Resource, Inc.
- Manufacturer: Broadrein Instruments; CyberVision Inc.; United Chem-Con
- Type: Home computer
- Released: 1978; 48 years ago
- Availability: United States, exclusively through Montgomery Ward
- Introductory price: $399
- Units shipped: 10,000
- Media: Stereo cassette tape
- Operating system: 1 KB ROM bootloader
- CPU: RCA 1802 @ ~2.52 MHz
- Memory: 4 KB RAM
- Display: 128 × 96 4-color; RF output
- Graphics: TI SN76430N
- Sound: Left-channel cassette audio; tone generator
- Input: 40-button keypads
- Power: 12 V AC
- Successor: CyberVision 3001

The CyberVision 2001 (commonly referred to as CyberVision Home Computer) was an early 8-bit home computer, distributed by Montgomery Ward in the late 1970s. Software was contained on stereo cassettes, allowing synchronized transmission of narrated audio recordings and sound effects from one channel and program data from the other. Home television sets were used for its display using an RF connector.

The Spring/Summer 1978 Montgomery Ward catalog featured CyberVision 2001 in a two-page opening spread, with a retail launch price of $399. Accompanying literature described the RCA 1802-powered system as "the revolutionary home computer... Programmed to talk... play games, teach math, or help with your tax return." Although a reported 10,000 units were shipped, limited traction coupled with manufacturing problems and rising competition resulted in discontinuation by the early 1980s and cancelation of the prototyped CyberVision 4001.

== History ==
The Authorship Resource, Inc. ("ARI") was founded in April 1977 by John Powers and Joe Miller in Franklin, Ohio. As part of contractual work on the QUBE project for Warner Cable, the two drove to a local computer shop to purchase a Compucolor 8001. On arrival, they met hardware engineers Jim McConnell and John McMullin who were actively working on a computer prototype to pitch to Montgomery Ward. Powers and Miller were formally hired to develop the CyberVision operating system on July 16, 1977, and had completed a functional version of the ROM by July 18 after an all-weekend development crunch.

ARI assembled a close team of additional designers and developers including Brenda Laurel, Ken Balthaser, Jeff Schwamberger and Janey Powers to produce additional software programs and demonstration tapes. On August 10, 1977, Miller conceived the name CyberVision as a juxtaposition of cybernetics and television and two days later the computer concept was presented in Chicago. On August 19, 1977, Montgomery Ward confirmed the computer would be the lead-in product for their 1978 Spring General catalog and expressed intent on ordering thousands of units for $250 wholesale. The CyberVision 2001 received a two-page opening spread in the 1978 Spring General, the copy prominently advertising it as a "home computer". With this, according to Kilobaud, the CyberVision 2001 was the first home computer available to the American public through a major mail order catalog.

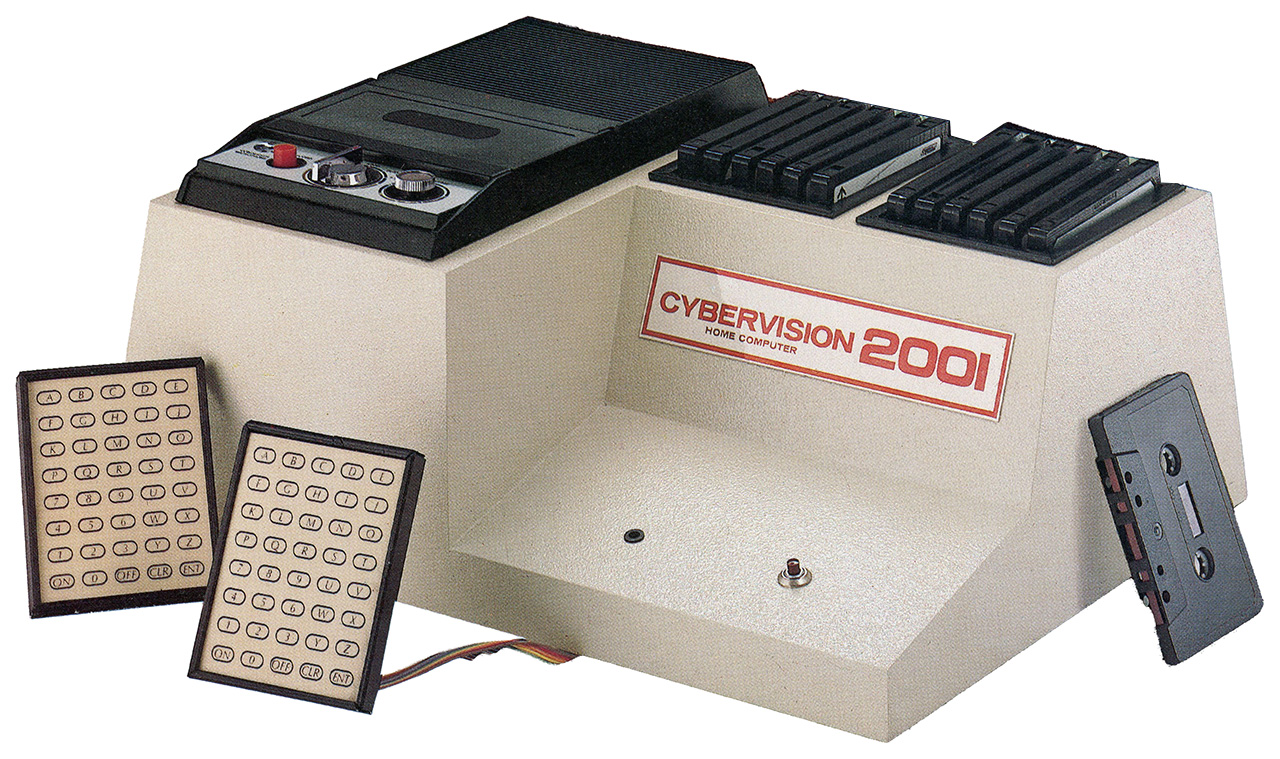
Early prototype of the CyberVision 2001

CyberVision 2001 appeared in select Montgomery Ward stores starting on June 2, 1978. Since the facilities did not have dedicated electronic areas, the units were sold within the sporting goods department instead. According to Miller, an order for 10,000 units was placed for the CyberVision 2001 and a second round of orders arrived for the 3001 variant. By July 1980, the system had been largely liquidated, with its catalog price diminishing to $88 for the computer and $1 per data tape.

United Chem-Con Corp. was tasked with manufacturing the computer and subsequently began marketing the 3001 edition as an attempted reboot in Pennsylvania in December 1980. According to Ken Balthaser, production was plagued from the beginning by manufacturing problems and lack of experience by Chem-Con, which at the time specialized in military equipment. In 1983, James Christian of Chem-Con was asked what happened to CyberVision and remarked: "We ranked in the top 20 in a survey conducted by Popular Mechanics magazine, but sales have diminished quite a bit...We built specifically to purchase orders and not to speculation."

Powers, Miller, Laurel and other core members of ARI ultimately moved to California to work at Atari and other technical ventures following the discontinuation of CyberVision.

== Technical specifications ==
- CPU: RCA 1802, 2.517483 MHz
- Memory: 4 KB RAM (2 KB data, 2 KB video)
- Operating system: 1 KB ROM bootloader
- Input: 40-button alphanumeric keypad controllers (TI Scientific Calculator membranes)
- Display: 128 × 96; at four colors (white, yellow, green, red)
- Characters: 6 × 9 alphanumeric
- Graphics: TI SN76430N video and sync generator
- Sound: Left-channel audio to internal speaker, basic tone generator
- Ports: RF out, two keypads
- Built-in stereo cassette recorder (2000 baud)
- PSU: External 12V AC transformer
- Price: US$399 (1978)

== Hardware ==
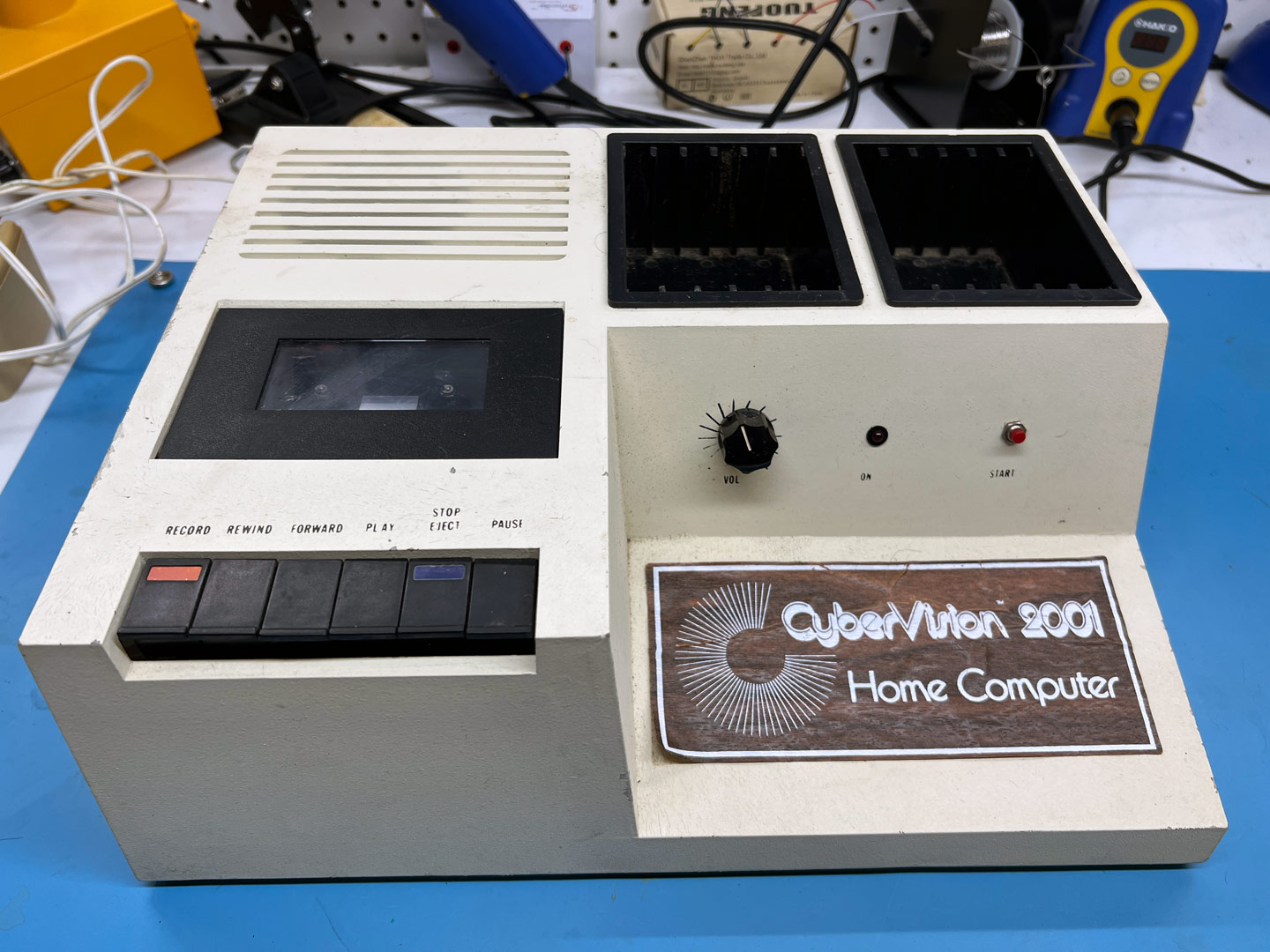
CyberVision 2001 Physical Enclosure

The physical enclosure is made out of structural foam. It includes an embedded stereo cassette deck and inset storage space for housing up to twelve caseless data cassette tapes. A power toggle switch, reset button, power LED and volume control are integrated into the cabinet. Two 24-pin joystick input ports and an RF output port complete the exterior. An enclosed speaker and amplifier provide audio output from the cassette data's left channel.

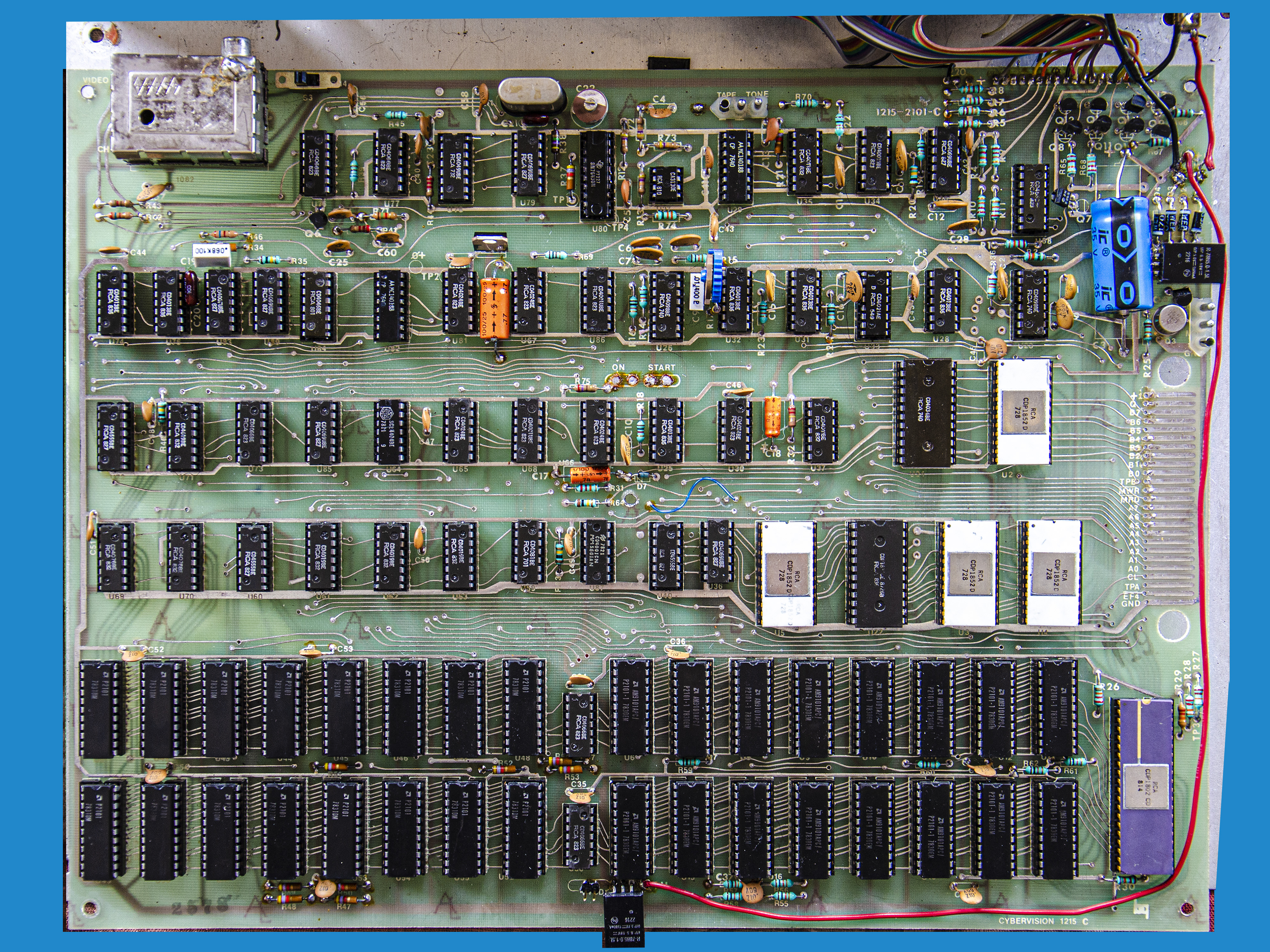
CyberVision 2001 logic board

Internally, 91 integrated circuits power the system. An RCA 1802 CPU running at approximately 2.52 MHz drives the 1 KB system ROM alongside four distinct CDP1852 input/output chips and a CD4034B bidirectional parallel bus, to handle peripheral interfacing. 4 KB of SRAM is contained across 32 P2101 chips, allocating 2 KB for video display and 2 KB for program data. The video signal is constructed using a TI SN76430N video and sync generator. No dedicated sound chip exists, but simple tones can be generated programmatically to output to an internal speaker. An internal ROM/CPU edge connector is present on the logic board, which would become a dedicated expansion slot in the 3001 model and the 4001 prototype.

Two replaceable 40-button plastic controller keypads are supplied for the unit, as the only means of accepting user input. These hand controllers lack any joystick or navigation keys common in other systems, but feature the full uppercase English alphanumeric character set along with four action buttons (On, Off, Clear, Enter). The membranes used inside of these controllers are provided by Texas Instruments, and match the ones used in their 40-key scientific calculators popularized in the 1970s. The prototyped CyberVision 4001 demonstrated a full mechanical keyboard accompaniment but was discontinued before production.

Construction of the CyberVision 2001 changed subtly over the course of its release. The system photographed for inclusion in Montgomery Ward and other advertisements had reversed arrangement of the logo and reset/LED mounts, as well as a top-mounted cassette deck with its own volume control. A more integral cassette player was furnished for the consumer product with a separate volume control mounted to the cabinet.

== Software ==
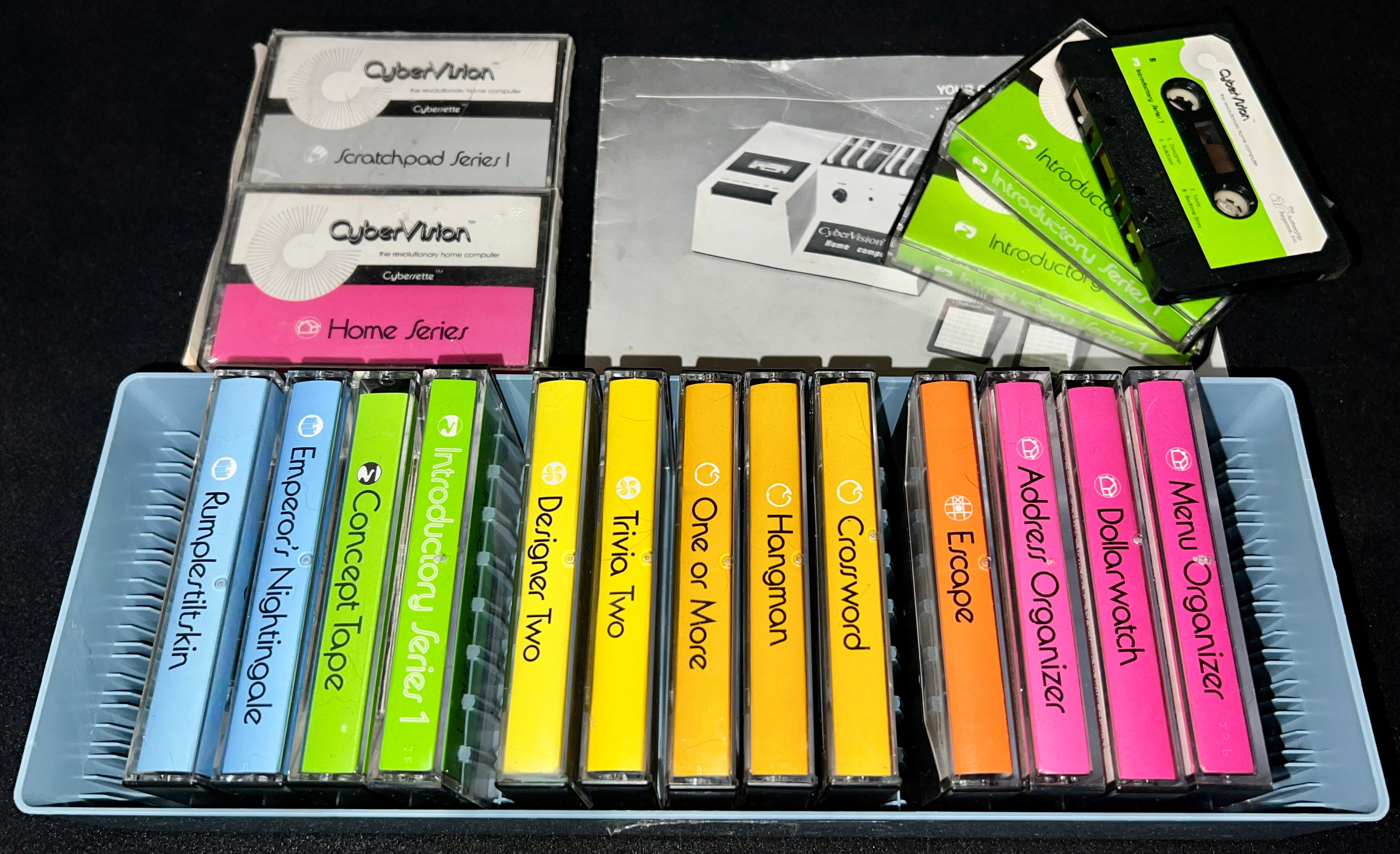
Data Cassettes (Cybersettes)

The CyberVision 2001 contains rudimentary bootloader code in the computer's 1 KB ROM. All programs are distributed on specially formatted stereo cassettes, marketed as Cybersettes, for playback within the embedded cassette deck. These commercially released cassettes were programmed in 1802 assembly.

=== Cybersettes ===
The CyberVision 2001 uses a unique dual-channel, hybrid analog and digital data cassette format, dubbed Cybersettes. In this scheme, an internal speaker outputs sound from the left audio channel, while the logic board parses the right channel's data using a 2000-baud interface. When reading tape data, the ROM initially checks for a sequence of A5 bytes as a rudimentary check for valid data. The tape motor can be programmatically toggled using the 1802 CPU's Q output port, as a means of controlling data flow.

The use of stereo cassette media allows software titles to integrate studio-quality audio recordings alongside on-screen data. Interactive storybooks for children were prominently displayed at tradeshows to demonstrate the innovation of this media format, which Creative Computing referred to as "the dawn of a new era in storytelling." Some programs play musical sound effects reminiscent of computer tones during data load sequences, while others narrate stories or provide usage instructions to help mask load times. The APF Imagination Machine from 1979 likewise uses a stereo cassette head to achieve similar effects.

==== Concept tape ====
CyberVision 2001 Concept Tape Audio Introduction

As part of pre-release promotions, a six-minute concept tape was produced for tradeshow demonstration. The cassette showcases the audiovisual capabilities of CyberVision and includes previews of several anticipated software programs, keypad interaction, animations and coloring effects. The process of creating these demo cassettes helped refine the tape mastering process, which was later used to more efficiently produce retail tapes in bulk.

==== Introduction Series 1 Sampler Tape ====
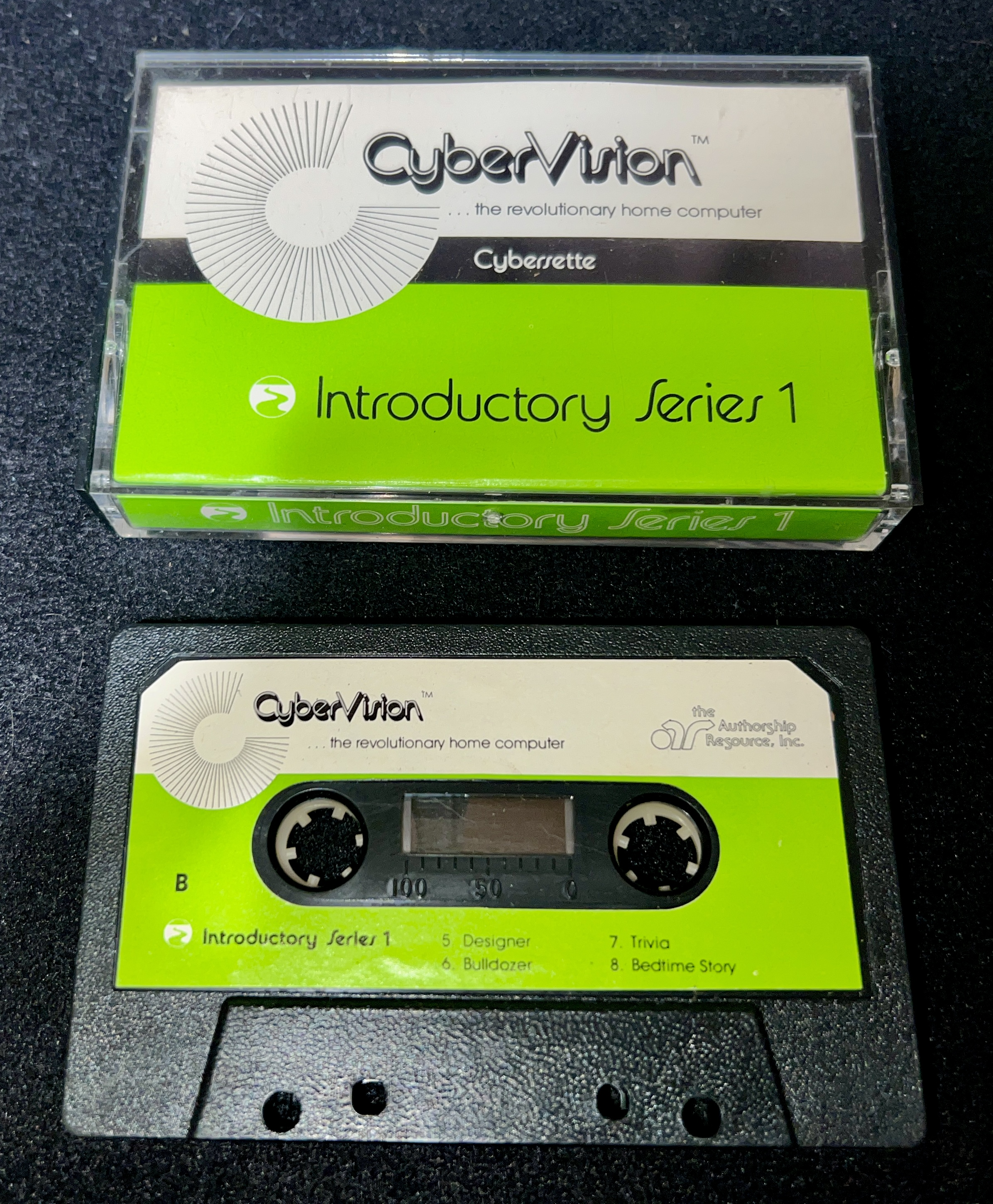
Introductory Series Cybersette Tape

A 60-minute cassette tape, titled Introduction Series 1 Sampler Tape, shipped with every CyberVision 2001 to showcase a range of nine applications, with four to five complete programs per side. An on-screen menu is provided at the tape start to allow direct program selection, whereby the system will fast-forward to the approximate program data location automatically.

- Adjustments: Test patterns to adjust the television display for optimal viewing of the four available colors and screen centering.
- Sub Chase: Action game where the player navigates dangerous waters to recover an unidentified flying object before interception by the enemy ship.
- Biocycles: Biorhythms and analysis of biological cycles based on user input.
- Math Madness – Meet the Meter: Educational math software to illustrate the metric system.
- Math Madness – Flash Fractions: Educational math software to illustrate fractions.
- Designer: A drawing application that allows the user to move and draw around the screen, with cassette storage capabilities.
- Bulldozer: Two-player game with arenas and mazes, where the object is to clean-up and move objects to target areas.
- Trivia: A memory-testing game.
- Bedtime Story: Narrated fairytale, Goldilocks and the Three Bears, with animated on-screen graphics.

==== Additional Cybersettes ====
While initial marketing indicated that there would be hundreds of software programs available for the system, only a small batch of titles were released before the product line was discontinued. At launch, each cassette tape cost between $9.95 and $18.95 and often included bundle deals, such as buy four, get one free.

Montgomery Ward encouraged users to "Join Wards' Cybersette Club and receive advance notice on all new Cybersettes." The programs were organized into several different color-coordinated series including game, education, home and story. Some software titles, including Designer II and Trivia II, were promoted as games but released under an unadvertised party series.

Not all tapes promoted in advertisements are known to have been released. In 1980, the general manager of Chem-Con's computer division estimated that there were "about 30 program tapes" available for CyberVision. The table below represents known titles from various sources, including Montgomery Ward advertisements.

CyberVision 2001 Software Titles
ID	Title	Tagline	Series	Source
101	Maze (Amazing)	Find your way out of this!	Game	
102	Bullfight	Listen to the crowd!	Game	
103	Mastermind	Are you as smart as you think you are?	Game	
104	Trivia II	So you think you know the little things?	Game	
105	Bandit (Slot Machine)	Win or lose against this evil one!	Game	
106	Moon Base	Land the ship!	Game	
107	Escape	Break out if you can! Use your ingenuity!	Game	
108	Star Flex (Pinball)	Beat the wizard!	Game	
109	Starship	Explore the universe!	Game	
110	Tank Fight	See, hear its power!	Game	
486	Designer II	Paint pictures, create designs or leave messages.	Game	
N/A	Close Encounters of the Third Kind		Game	
201	Fish by Number	Pre-school educational game, number concepts.	Education	
202	Battleship	Grade school educational game.	Education	
203	Spelling Bee	Select vocabulary.	Education	
204	Crossword	Select difficulty.	Education	
205	One or More	Pre-school number game.	Education	
206	Language Arts	Grade 1.	Education	
207	Math	Grade 2.	Education	
208	Math	Grade 3.	Education	
209	Math	Grade 4.	Education	
210	Language Arts	Grade 2.	Education	
211	Language Arts	Grade 3.	Education	
212	Language Arts	Grade 4.	Education	
213	Mouse in My House	Grade 1 reading.	Education	
214	Reading	Grade 2.	Education	
215	Introduction to Money Management		Education	
216	Hangman	School days word game.	Education	
301	Income Tax	Preparation aids and data bank.	Home	
302	Tools and Their Basic Functions		Home	
303	Dollar Watch	Checkbook function, 10-memory calculator.	Home	
304	Vegetable Gardening		Home	
305	Calendar (Clock and Alarm)	Basic functions of time.	Home	
484	Address Organizer	Addresses and phone numbers in an instant.	Home	
485	Menu Organizer	Store over a thousand menus on a single Cybersette.	Home	
401	Hansel and Gretel		Story	
402	Rumpelstiltskin		Story	
403	Beauty and the Beast		Story	
404	Three Billy Goats Gruff		Story	
405	Emperor's Nightingale		Story	
406	Three Little Pigs		Story	
407	Three Bears		Story	
408	Jack and the Beanstalk		Story	
409	Sleeping Beauty		Story	

== Successors ==
=== CyberVision 3001 ===
As part of a second order request from Montgomery Ward in 1979 and 1980, the CyberVision 3001 model was released and sported a new injection molded form-factor. The 3001 is backward compatible with the 2001 and contains the same general hardware, internally. Depending on literature, the 3001 was often still branded as a 2001 or more broadly as the CyberVision Home Computer.

One substantial enhancement of the 3001 was the availability of an external expansion port that accommodated ROM cartridges in addition to cassette tape data. A version of Tiny BASIC was supplied on one such cartridge, allowing users to program their own Cybersettes using 22 different integer BASIC commands. According to Interface Age datasheets, the total usable RAM for BASIC was 1.753 KB, but it was promoted as upgradable to 32 KB of RAM.

By late 1979, the exclusivity agreement between the developers of the CyberVision and Montgomery Ward had expired. This allowed the revamped version of the CyberVision to be resold by other companies, and on December 13, 1980, it debuted locally in Pennsylvania through United Chem-Con for $329. It was promoted and displayed at regional electronic shops including Gallagher's TV in Lancaster, Pennsylvania.

=== CyberVision 4001 ===
A second iteration of the system, CyberVision 4001, was demonstrated at various tradeshows in 1979 as a functional prototype. This incarnation of the CyberVision was manufactured and resold by Broadrein Instruments of Columbus, Ohio. The refined unit has a similar form factor to the 3001 and remains compatible with all existing software. The planned retail price was $550, and the system was to offer an optional $100 QWERTY keyboard accessory alongside the original 40-button alphanumeric keypads.

The base 4001 system includes 9 KB of RAM (6 KB for program data, 2 KB for video display and 1 KB alpha RAM) and dual 1802 microprocessors for multiprocessing capabilities. Internally, the 16 KB ROM incorporates integer BASIC, with floating point BASIC available as an external ROM (an extension of Ron Cenker's 1802 BASIC). According to Joe Miller, only one of these prototypes was built.

== Emulation ==
As of April 2023, Emma 02 has added beta emulation support for CyberVision 2001 among its large variety of 1802-based platforms. Many software titles remain unavailable, pending discovery and digitization.
