= Secret Paths (video game) =

- Developer: Purple Moon
- Genre: Interactive novel

Secret Paths in the Forest is a video game developed by Purple Moon. The game was designed to be episodic, and spawned sequels entitled "Secret Paths to Your Dreams" and "Secret Paths to the Sea”, which were released under Mattel after its 1999 acquisition of Purple Moon.

== Plot and gameplay ==
The game sees characters return from Rockett's New School, where in a treehouse they reveal their deepest fears and thoughts. An example is Vietnamese-American child Minh, who is unhappy at the discordance in her parents' cultures. Secret Paths to Your Dreams acts as diary software akin to Rockett's Adventure Maker.

== Production ==
The game was designed as a result of years of market testing the way boys and girls respond to games differently, something which was heavily discussed at the time in video gaming literature.

A 30-second TV spot for Secret Paths in the Forest played on network and cable stations in New York and Chicago in late 1997. In 1998, Purple Moon held a Sea World Treasure Trove promotion, part of which included the selling of this software at Sea World.

== Critical reception ==
In December 1997 alone, Secret Paths sold 23,539 units in the United States, according to PC Data. An article in The New York Times noted that young female playtesters enjoyed the title due to allowing them to see their own experiences played out through video game characters. In 2017, Vice retrospectively looked at the game as a "(now adorably primitive) digital tool for building visual narratives". The Wow Climax: Tracing the Emotional Impact of Popular Culture thought the game wholly embodied the juvenile goth tradition of revealing secrets to how the adult world works and giving the players tools to deal with it.

The title was one of the top fifty selling entertainment titles over the 1997 holiday season. It became one of Purple Moon's most popular games, and critically acclaimed. The game was nominated by the Academy of Interactive Arts & Sciences in the category of PC Family/Kids Title of the Year during its inaugural awards ceremony.
