= Brenda Laurel =

American video game developer

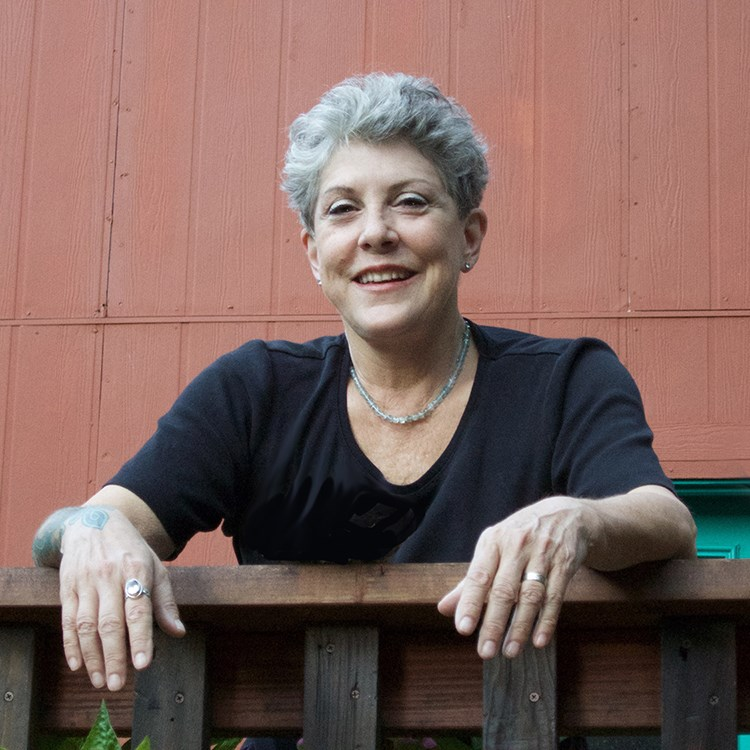
- Laurel in 2016
- Born: November 20, 1950 (age 75); Columbus, Ohio, United States
- Education: DePauw University, Ohio State University
- Known for: Human-computer interaction Interactive narrative Cultural aspects of technology
- Movement: Interactive storytelling Game development research Game development for girls
- Partner: Rob Tow
- Website: http://www.tauzero.com/Brenda_Laurel/

Brenda Laurel (born 1950) is an American interaction designer, video game designer, and researcher. She is an advocate for diversity and inclusiveness in video games, a "pioneer in developing virtual reality", a public speaker, and an academic. She was founder and chair of the graduate design program at California College of the Arts from 2006 to 2012 and the media design graduate program at Art Center College of Design from 2000 to 2006. She has worked for Atari, co-founded the game development studio Purple Moon, and served as an interaction design consultant for multiple companies including Sony Pictures, Apple, and Citibank. As of 2021, her work focuses on STE(A)M learning, and the application of augmented reality within it.

== Early life and education ==
Brenda Kay Laurel was born on November 20, 1950, in Columbus, Ohio. She received her Bachelor of Arts from DePauw University, and her Masters of Fine Arts in acting and directing, as well as her Ph.D. in drama theory and crit from Ohio State University. Her Ph.D. dissertation (1986) was titled "Toward the Design of a Computer-Based Interactive Fantasy System"; it would inform her 1991 book "Computers as Theater".

== Career ==
Whern Laurel was in college, one of her friends was studying in computer graphics. That friend ended up opening Cybervision, and asked Laurel to join him on this journey.

Laurel's first games were for the CyberVision 2001 platform, where she worked as a designer, programmer, and manager of educational product design from 1976–1979. She then moved to Atari as a software specialist, later becoming manager of the Home Computer Division for Software Strategy and Marketing, where she worked from 1980 to 1983. After finishing her Ph.D., Laurel worked for Activision from 1985 to 1987. In the late 1980s and early 1990s she worked as a creative consultant on a number of LucasArts Entertainment games, and Chris Crawford's Balance of the Planet. During this time Laurel also co-founded Telepresence Research, Inc., and became a research staff member at the Interval Research Corporation. Here she worked on research investigating the relationship between gender and technology as she had become increasingly frustrated by the fact that girls tended not to play video games. She is also a board member at several companies and organizations.

Laurel continues to work as a consultant, and speaker while focusing on her research for STE(A)M learning. She advises on interactive media and experience design, including concept development, research management, and brand and business development. In later years, Laurel shifted her focus from video games to broader interactive technology.

=== Purple Moon and games for girls ===
As one of the earliest female game designers, Laurel became active in writing on the topic of developing video games for girls. In the early 1990s, Laurel undertook a research study to find out why girls were not playing video games. She posited that while the early video game industry focused almost exclusively upon developing products aimed at young men, girls were not inherently disinterested in the medium. Rather, girls were simply interested in different kinds of gaming experiences. Her research suggested that young women tended to prefer experiences based around complex social interaction, verbal skills, and transmedia storytelling.

The game business arose from computer programs that were written by and for young men in the late 1960s and early 1970s. They worked so well that they formed a very lucrative industry fairly quickly. But what worked for that demographic absolutely did not work for most girls and women.

— Brenda Laurel, Wired Magazine

In 1996, Laurel founded Purple Moon, a software company focused on creating games aimed at girls between the ages of 8 and 14. Laurel's vision was to create games for girls that had a greater focus on real-life decision-making rather than appearances and materiality. She also hoped the games would acclimate girls to technology at an earlier age. The company was an experiment in turning research on girls' gaming preferences into marketable video games. The firm produced games designed around storytelling, open-ended exploration, and rehearsing realistic scenarios from everyday life, as opposed to competitive games featuring scores and timed segments. The company produced ten games primarily divided into two series: Rockett, which focused around a young girl's daily interactions, and the more meditative Secret Path series. Purple Moon was also known for its website, which allowed girls to communicate with each other and with Purple Moon developers. Purple Moon was eventually acquired by Mattel in 1999, but was later closed.

Purple Moon was criticized for focusing on designing games based on gender, thereby reinforcing conventional gender roles.

=== Virtual reality ===
In 1989, Laurel and Scott Fisher founded Telepresence Research, a company focusing in first-person media, virtual reality, and remote presence research and development.

In Laurel's work regarding interface design, she is well known for her support of the theory of interactivity, the "degree to which users of a medium can influence the form or content of the mediated environment." Virtual reality, according to Laurel, is less characterized by its imaginary or unreal elements than by its multisensory representation of objects, be they real or imaginary. While discussions around virtual reality tended to center on visual representations, audio and kinesthesia are two potent sources of sensory input that virtual reality devices attempt to tap into. Laurel's 1994 Placeholder installation at Banff Center for the Arts—a collaboration with Rachel Strickland—explored these multisensory possibilities. Placeholder was the first VR project to separate gaze from direction of movement, allow for two hands to participate, support two player games, and use imagery from natural landscape. The installation allowed multiple people to construct a narrative by attaching movement trackers to its subjects' bodies while letting them navigate a virtual environment by doing common physical acts with special results, such as flapping one's arms to fly.

=== Academia ===
Following the closure of Purple Moon, Laurel worked as chair and professor at the ArtCenter College of Design, and later the California College of the Arts, additionally becoming an adjunct professor at the University of California, Santa Cruz. She has also taught Design in the Polis.

== Awards ==
In 2015 Laurel won the Trailblazer award at the IndieCade festival.

In 2017 Laurel won the Virtual World Society Nextant Prize award at the Augmented World Expo (AWE).

== Works ==
=== Books ===
- Computers as Theatre (2nd Edition), Addison-Wesley Professional, (2013) ISBN 0321918622
- Design Research: Methods and Perspectives, MIT Press, (2004) ISBN 0-262-12263-4
- Utopian Entrepreneur, MIT Press (2001) ISBN 0-262-62153-3
- Computers as Theatre, Addison-Wesley (1991) ISBN 0-201-55060-1
- The Art of Human-Computer Interface Design, Addison-Wesley (1990) ISBN 0-201-51797-3

=== Essays ===
"Tech Work by Heart" in Women, Technology, Art, edited by Judy Malloy, is an early essay explaining the origins of Purple Moon.

=== Games ===
- Goldilocks, on CyberVision. (1978)
- Hangman, on CyberVision. (1978)
- Labyrinth: The Computer Game (1986)
- Rockett's New School, Purple Moon Media. (1997)
- Secret Paths in the Forest, Purple Moon Media. (1997) ISBN 9781890278168
- Rockett's Tricky Decision, Purple Moon Media. (1998)
- Rockett's Secret Invitation, Purple Moon Media. (1998) ISBN 9781890278281
- Rockett's First Dance, Purple Moon Media. (1998)
- Rockett's Adventure Maker, Purple Moon Media. (1998)
- Secret Paths to the Sea, Purple Moon Media. (1998)
- Starfire Soccer Challenge, Purple Moon Media. (1998)

== Media appearances ==
- Colonizing Cyberspace (1991)
- Cyberpunk (1990)
- Brenda Laurel at TED
  - "Games for girls" (TED1998)

== Personal life ==
Laurel works as a consultant and speaker, and is a part-time abalone diver.

== See also ==
- List of programmers
- List of women in the video game industry
- Women and video games
- Women in computing
