= Jenny of the Prairie =

1983 video game

- Developer: Rhiannon Software
- Publisher: Addison-Wesley
- Programmer: Ken Hollis
- Artists: Elizabeth Stott; Lucy Ewell
- Composers: Elizabeth Stott; Lucy Ewell
- Platforms: Apple II, Atari 8-bit, Commodore 64, MS-DOS
- Release: 1983
- Genre: Adventure
- Mode: Single-player

Jenny of the Prairie is an adventure game developed by Rhiannon Software for the Apple II and released in 1983. Addison-Wesley published versions for Atari 8-bit computers, Commodore 64, and MS-DOS. The player helps Jenny, a "plucky pioneer girl" in the 1840s, survive the winter after becoming separated from her wagon, by collecting food and building shelter. It is one of the first computer games widely documented as designed by women, with a female protagonist, and targeted specifically to girls as an audience.

The game is the first in a series of four adventure titles named Adventure Stories for Girls by Rhiannon Software. The series was created as part of an effort by co-designers, counsellor Elizabeth Stott and software designer Lucy Werth Ewell, to provide an alternative to games marketed to boys. Upon release, Jenny of the Prairie received average reviews, with recognition from critics on the game's appeal to girls, but mixed views on the gameplay, visuals and difficulty. Retrospectively, Jenny of the Prairie received recognition for its feminist qualities, although views were mixed on the game's appeal and educational potential.

== Gameplay ==
Screenshot of Commodore 64 version of the game, depicting Jenny in a field and the text output.

Jenny of the Prairie is an adventure game in which the objective is to accumulate points to prepare for the winter by undertaking tasks, including collecting food, and finding and using tools to build a shelter or make clothing. Players explore nine environments, including a forest and cave, to find resources and tools. Jenny can only carry one tool at a time, which include a slingshot for hunting rabbits, a hatchet for chopping wood, and a spear for fishing. Initially, Jenny must find 40 points of food from sources including apples, wheat or hunting rabbits to explore other areas. On harder difficulty levels, if Jenny does not accumulate enough provisions and earn enough points by the arrival of winter, signalled by a blizzard, she does not survive and the game is over. She must also avoid hazards, including dangerous animals such as rattlesnakes or coyotes. The game has three difficulty levels: the first has no time limit and a fixed location for hazards, the second has moving hazards and a blizzard that appears after three bouts of light snow, and the third has an unpredictable timing for the arrival of the blizzard.

== Development and release ==
Jenny of the Prairie was released by Rhiannon Software, a Virginia-based studio founded by Elizabeth Stott and Lucy Werth Ewell in 1982. It was the first in a series of four titles named Adventure Stories for Girls, accompanied by Lauren of the 25th Century, Chelsea of the South Sea Islands and Cave Girl Clair. Stott, a licensed counsellor, and Ewell, a computer analyst, who were self-described feminists, aimed to make computer games that would appeal to girls. It was one of the first documented computer software titles to be created by women, targeted at girls, and featuring a female protagonist. Based on observations that girls were disinterested in games played by boys, Stott stated the reason for developing Rhiannon Software titles was that software for children was often marketed to boys, which she saw as reinforcing the message that it was "not okay" for girls to work with computers. An objective of the series was to assist girls with confidence when using computers in their classrooms. The game was designed for girls aged between seven to twelve. To appeal to this cohort and differentiate from titles designed for boys, the game focused on female-led characters, and presented an appealing visual design. Stott stated the series was also marketed as a non-violent one, with the games intended to "invite creativity, exploration and reverence for life" in congruence with "the way women have been socialized to think and operate in the world". Jenny of the Prairie's gameplay intended to present real-life situations requiring problem solving and decision-making, with the game tested on "extensive" research and field testing with boys and girls in elementary classrooms. The game's visuals were created using the Graphics Magician suite.

Rhiannon Software announced the game's release in 1983, advertising the game in Softalk in May of that year. Addison-Wesley published and marketed the Rihannon software catalog, showcasing the series at the 1984 Softcon trade show and January 1985 Winter Consumer Electronics Show.

== Reception ==
Stott stated that whilst the commercial performance of Rhiannon Software faced business struggles and limited interest from consumers, the Adventure Games for Girls series broke even in 1984. Describing the game as a "good means of introducing computer and problem solving skills to young girls", Core praised the visual presentation, but found the game's animation was "rough". inCider considered the game's graphics to be "delightful" and fun for most ages, but found the easiest difficulty levels too simple and boring to be challenging. Several reviewers tested the game with their children: InfoWorld observed a child of the magazine's writers found the game exciting and challenging as it "required her to make choices and to think about those choices", but found some of the game's icons difficult to identify. Family Computing observed that children expressed frustration at the game's logic, as it did not allow them to use tools as weapons against wild animals. Despite stating Jenny appeared "cute at first glance", Japanese magazine Logic commented on the game's morbid "life or death" undertone and difficulty, stating "as the game's levels increase, the situation becomes one in which it seems like Jenny should be killed", similarly finding it to be "unacceptable" that players could only run from enemies.

Jenny of the Prairie also received academic interest and criticism, particularly as an early attempt to develop software targeted towards young girls. The game has been cited as an example of an early game with feminist themes, as an alternative to the software of the time. Researcher Rosemary Sutton stated the game was a moderately successful attempt to create software for girls and reflect their interests and learning styles, as it "portrayed females as active problem solvers" rather than reinforced female stereotypes. Retrospectively, Whole Earth Review stated that Jenny of the Prairie was a "noble" representative of a trend of "attempts to gear adventure games and educational software towards young women" in the mid 1980s. However, the title also received criticism. Educator C.A. Bowers stated that the game was well-intentioned as a feminist response to works like The Oregon Trail that depicted a "masculine interpretation of the pioneer experience", but its ahistorical design and relativistic "no right or wrong" approach to decision-making limited its educational potential. Educator Valerie Clarke stated the game was representative of unsuccessful attempts to develop software for girls, finding it to be "less exciting, less appealing and of limited interest to both girls and boys".
