= List of Hot Wheels video games =

Various video games based on Hot Wheels have been released for numerous consoles, PCs and mobile devices:

== Games ==
- Hot Wheels (1984), released for the Commodore 64.
- Hot Wheels Rally (1996), released for Microsoft Windows alongside a custom car shaped computer mouse.
- Hot Wheels Custom Car Designer (1997), released for Microsoft Windows.
- Hot Wheels Stunt Track Driver (1998), released for Microsoft Windows and later for the Game Boy Color.
- Hot Wheels Turbo Racing (1999), released for the Nintendo 64 and the PlayStation.
- Hot Wheels: Crash! (1999), released for Microsoft Windows.
- Hot Wheels: Slot Car Racing (2000), released for the personal computer.
- Hot Wheels Stunt Track Driver 2: Get'n Dirty (2000), released for the personal computer.
- Hot Wheels Micro Racers (2000), released for Microsoft Windows.
- Planet Hot Wheels (2001), a massively multiplayer online game for Microsoft Windows and Mac OS.
- Hot Wheels Mechanix (2001), released for Microsoft Windows.
- Hot Wheels Extreme Racing (2001), released for the PlayStation.
- Hot Wheels Jetz (2001), released for Microsoft Windows.
- Hot Wheels: Burnin' Rubber (2001), released for the Game Boy Advance.
- Hot Wheels: Williams F1 Team Driver (2001), released for Microsoft Windows.
- Hot Wheels: Bash Arena (2002), released for the personal computer.
- Hot Wheels Velocity X (2002), released for the Game Boy Advance, Microsoft Windows, Nintendo GameCube, and PlayStation 2.
- Hot Wheels: World Race (2003), released for the Game Boy Advance, Microsoft Windows, Nintendo GameCube, and PlayStation 2.
- Hot Wheels: Stunt Track Challenge (2004), released for the Game Boy Advance, Microsoft Windows, PlayStation 2, and Xbox.
- Hot Wheels: All Out (2006), an isometric racing game, released for the Game Boy Advance.
- Hot Wheels Ultimate Racing (2007), released for the PlayStation Portable.
- Hot Wheels: Beat That! (2007), released for the Microsoft Windows, Nintendo DS, PlayStation 2, Wii, and Xbox 360.
- Hot Wheels Battle Force 5 (2009), released for the Nintendo DS and Wii.
- Hot Wheels Track Attack (2010), released for the Nintendo DS and Wii.
- Hot Wheels: World's Best Driver (2013), released for iOS, Nintendo 3DS, Microsoft Windows, PlayStation 3, Wii U, and Xbox 360.
- Hot Wheels Showdown (2014), released for mobile devices (Android and iOS).
- Need for Speed: No Limits (2015), released as downloadable content on Google Play for Android and on the App Store for iOS, in partnership with Jun Imai and Mattel, specifically, through an update patch that was named Hot Wheels in Version 2.0.6 of the game that was released on March 9, 2017.
- Drive Ahead (2015), the mobile game partnered with Hot Wheels in 2019. The update added five new bosses along with new maps and cars only available during the Hot Wheels event. The event concluded later the same year. Developers have stated that there are no current plans to have another Hot Wheels event.
- Rocket League (2015), two cars (along with other Hot Wheels branded cosmetic items) released in 2017 as downloadable content.
- Hot Wheels: Race Car Rush (2016), released for the web browser.
- Forza Horizon 3: Hot Wheels (2017), released as an expansion pack for Forza Horizon 3 (2016) on Windows 10 and Xbox One, in partnership with Xbox Game Studios.
- Hot Wheels: MindRacer (2017), released for iPads in partnership with tech startup Osmo.
- Hot Wheels: Race Off (2017), released for mobile devices (Android and iOS) and Apple Arcade.
- Hot Wheels Infinite Loop (2019)
- Hot Wheels Open World (2020)
- Hot Wheels Unleashed (2021), released for Microsoft Windows, Nintendo Switch, PlayStations 4 and 5 and Xbox One and Xbox Series X/S.
- Hot Wheels Open World (2021), a game developed by Gamefam on video game platform Roblox. It was released on Android, iOS/iPadOS, Microsoft Windows, MacOS and Xbox One.
- Forza Horizon 4 Hot Wheels Legends Car Pack (2021) DLC for Xbox One and Microsoft Windows.
- Forza Horizon 5: Hot Wheels (2022), is a DLC pack for Forza Horizon 5 (2021) similar to Forza Horizon 3: Hot Wheels (2016). The expansion was released on Microsoft Windows 11, Xbox One and Xbox Series X/S. The expansion pack has added many assets to the game such as 10 new exclusive cars, a new Hot Wheels Creation Kit to Eventlab and over of track and four different biomes (The Horizon Nexus, The Ice Cauldron, Forest Falls and The Giant's Canyon) to explore.
- Hot Wheels Rift Rally (2023), a video game developed by Velan Studios released on iOS/iPadOS and PlayStations 4 and 5.
- Hot Wheels Unleashed 2: Turbocharged (2023)
- Hot Wheels Monster Trucks: Stunt Mayhem (2024), release for Nintendo Switch, Microsoft Windows, PlayStation 4, PlayStation 5, Xbox One and Xbox Series X/S.
- Hot Wheels Let's Race: Ultimate Speed (2025), release for Nintendo Switch, Microsoft Windows, PlayStation 5 and Xbox Series X/S.120 miles (190 kilometres)
- Hot Wheels Infinite Rush (2026), release for Nintendo Switch 2, Microsoft Windows, PlayStation 5 and Xbox Series X/S
