= All Out =

All Out or All out may refer to:

== Music ==
- All Out (album), a 1973 album by Grin
- All Out (EP), a 2020 EP by K/DA

== Sports ==
- All out (cricket), an end of an innings situation in cricket
- All Out Motorsports, a 2018–2021 American stock-car racing team
- AEW All Out, an annual professional wrestling event

== Other uses ==
- All Out!!, a 2012–2019 Japanese manga series
- All Out (organisation), a nonprofit that advocates for the human rights of LGBT people
- Hot Wheels: All Out, a video game

== See also ==
- All Out of Love (disambiguation)
- All Out War (disambiguation)
