= Barbie PC and Hot Wheels PC =

1999 Barbie and Hot Wheels branded desktop computers

- Manufacturer: Patriot Computers Corporation
- Type: Desktop computer
- Released: September 1999
- Operating system: Microsoft Windows
- CPU: Intel Celeron at 333 MHz
- Storage: 3 GB HDD
- Display: 15 in (38 cm)
- Input: Keyboard; CD drive

The Barbie PC and the Hot Wheels PC were a pair of branded desktop computers manufactured by Patriot Computers Corporation in partnership with Mattel and officially released in September 1999 in the US and Canada. Branded after the Barbie and Hot Wheels toy lines, the Barbie version was advertised for girls, the Hot Wheels version for boys. The Barbie PC was bundled with 20 software programs, including numerous Barbie titles like Barbie Riding Club and Detective Barbie in the Mystery of the Carnival Caper and the Barbie digital camera. The Barbie PC's appearance was silver with "pink and purple floral accents". The Hot Wheels PC featured a similar assortment of software, including Hot Wheels Stunt Track Driver and a racing wheel. The Hot Wheels PC's appearance was blue with flame-shaped decals. Both featured an Intel Celeron processor clocked at 333 MHz, a 3 GB hard disk drive, and a 15-inch monitor.

Mattel faced criticism for the software they decided to bundle with the Barbie PC, because the similar Hot Wheels PC for boys had more educational titles. Critics argued that Mattel was playing into the stereotype that girls were not interested in intellectual activities. Pamela Haag from the American Association of University Women also said there was no need to make games specifically targeting girls in the first place, because "girls' and boys' interests in software tend to converge a great deal". Dana Henry, a spokesperson from Mattel, responded that both PCs had almost the same number of programs, but the girls' PC had to make room for all of the popular Barbie titles.

Originally scheduled to go out before the 1999 Christmas season, the manufacturer had to delay shipments due to defective power supplies. Many customers also canceled their orders, and those who received the defective part returned their PC. Under financial pressure from the faulty part, increased returns, and order cancellations, Patriot Computers Corporation filed for bankruptcy a year later in December 2000, having failed to deliver 3,100 Barbie and Hot Wheels PCs. Mattel gave buyers a $100 giftcard for the trouble.

== See also ==
- Fuhu, a mobile computing company acquired by Mattel
