= Hot Wheels Infinite Rush =

2026 video game

- Developer: Milestone
- Publisher: Plaion
- Director: Michele Caletti
- Series: Hot Wheels
- Engine: Unreal Engine 5
- Platforms: Nintendo Switch 2; PlayStation 5; Windows; Xbox Series X/S
- Release: September 10, 2026
- Genre: Racing
- Modes: Single-player, multiplayer

Hot Wheels Infinite Rush is a 2026 racing video game developed and published by Milestone. The third Hot Wheels title made by Milestone, Infinite Rush differentiates itself from Hot Wheels Unleashed and Hot Wheels Unleashed 2: Turbocharged by having four distinct open world maps.

== Gameplay ==
Similar to the previous two Unleashed titles, Infinite Rush is a racing game in which players assume control of vehicles from the Hot Wheels franchise. There are over 150 vehicles in the base game. The vehicles are split into four classes: Versatile, Speeder, Drifter, and Titan. Versatile vehicle types do well in all types of events, Speeders are best optimized for speed, Drifters are best used in drifting, and Titans are suited for off-road driving. Each vehicle can be upgraded with four classes of mods, C-level, B-level, A-level, and S-level. Infinite Rush has an open world map with four distinct islands players can drive in; Wheelswood, Tentacle Bay, Gearville, and Drifty Temples. Throughout the map, players can perform various stunts and destroy environmental props such as street lights and bushes, through which players get rewarded with XP. The map also includes multiple points of interest and collectables for players to discover.

Regarding the game's progression, Infinite Rush director Michele Caletti stated that there will be a "slower and natural progression" in the initial hours of hours of the game. All players start in Wheelswood and progress from there. Each island has crews called "Rush Squads" that players go up against, and each is led by a "Rush Master". The Rush Master is the final boss players go up against in order to become the master of an island. Beating a Rush Master unlocks their car and title. The ultimate goal for players is to become the master of each island, where they will be crowned as the "greatest racer".

Unlike the previous Unleashed titles, players must drive around the map to discover new race routes before being able to enter them. Multiple event types exist in the game, including races, checkpoint challenges, and destruction events. As in the previous entries, players can create their own tracks and car liveries. In Infinite Rush, AI opponents can be added to custom tracks, allowing players to race on user created tracks.

Players can play online with cross-platform multiplayer, where they can compete in ranked matches or Rush Events.

== Development ==
The game was officially revealed in June 2026. Originally set to be released for Nintendo Switch 2, PlayStation 5, Windows and Xbox Series X and Series S on September 24, 2026, the release date was subsequently moved to September 10. A future Ferrari DLC expansion will be released, which includes eight cars from the manufacturer, as well as a new island dubbed Isola Ferrari. There is also a vehicle pass players can purchase which adds 44 vehicles from launch until April of 2027.

== Reception ==
According to review aggregator Metacritic, the PC, PS5 and Xbox Series X/S versions received "generally favorable" reviews, while the Nintendo Switch 2 version received "mixed or average" reviews. Fellow review aggregator OpenCritic assessed that the game received strong approval, being recommended by 62% of critics.
