= Detective Barbie in the Mystery of the Carnival Caper =

- CD-ROM cover for the game
- Developer: Gorilla Systems Corporation
- Publisher: Mattel Media
- Platform: Windows
- Release: October 1998
- Genres: Mystery, adventure

Detective Barbie in the Mystery of the Carnival Caper is a 1998 video game developed by Gorilla Systems Corporation and published by Mattel Media for Microsoft Windows. It is a Barbie-licensed game and part of the Detective Barbie series. In the game, players become junior detectives and team up with Barbie and her friend Becky to solve the mystery of who kidnapped Ken and stole charity money during a magic show at a carnival. Players point and click with their mouse to explore 3D carnival scenes with Barbie and drag an in-game magnifying glass to search for clues. At checkpoints in the game, the player and Barbie will catch sight of a shadowy figure and chase them onto one of the rides. Using clues and information gathered from suspect interviews, the player can help Barbie rescue Ken, find the stolen money, and apprehend the culprit. The game is replayable, and the clues and guilty suspect change each time. It was designed for children 5 and up.

Upon release, Detective Barbie was the ninth bestselling computer game across 13 software retail chains in the US and was part of a growing trend of new girls' video games. Reviews of the game were mixed: some praised its aesthetics and challenges, while others said the gameplay frustrated younger players. Looking back on Detective Barbie over 20 years later, reviewers who played the game as children said that the gameplay felt empowering and, at times, scary.

== Plot and gameplay ==
Detective Barbie in the Mystery of the Carnival Caper takes place at a carnival the night before it opens to the public for a charity event. Ken disappears with the charity money during the magician's act. Detectives Barbie and Becky are on the scene and ask the player to help them solve the mystery of what happened to Ken and the money. Before the player starts the investigation, they choose their name and create their junior detective badge. There are 50,000 names to choose from, and Barbie will say the player's name throughout the game. The names were recorded by Barbie's voice actor, Chris Anthony Lansdowne.

Players can explore 25 different 3D scenes and locations with Barbie in the carnival by dragging their mouse cursor to the edges of the screen until it becomes a pink arrow, indicating the direction that Barbie will walk. When the player switches the cursor to a magnifying glass, they can drag it across the screen to reveal hidden footprints or hand prints. Footprints lead to suspects, and handprints reveal clues and secrets. The magnifying glass will also highlight tools that Barbie can use. Barbie can go on tall rides to gain a high vantage point and survey the carnival grounds.

Players find clues with the magnifying glass and upload them to the crime computer (lower right).

Whenever the player finds a clue or interviews a suspect, Barbie will document it in the crime computer, and Becky will share analysis and tips about each new piece of evidence. There are 50 randomized clues, and four suspects: Madame Wanda, the magician; the owner, Burt Franklin; the carnival manager and owner's son, Jake Franklin; and Artie the handyman. When Barbie spots a shadowy suspect, she chases them onto a carnival ride: down a water slide; around the bumper cars ride; or through the Tunnel of Love ride on a jet ski, using the swans as ramps. A frog water gun game in the carnival has a multiplayer component: one player controls Barbie as she shoots water into a frog's mouth, while a second player operates a different water gun with the keyboard. Detective Barbie is replayable, and the clues and guilty suspect change with each new playthrough.

== Development ==
Detective Barbie in the Mystery of the Carnival Caper was developed by Gorilla Systems Corporation and published by Mattel Media in October 1998. It ran on Windows 95 and Windows 98 operating systems. For Gorilla Systems Corporation, Jonathan O'Neill Browne was executive producer, Dino Kotopoulis and Jeremy Cail were responsible for the art direction, and Jeffrey Fullerton was the lead programmer on the project. Jesyca C. Durchin was the executive producer from Mattel. The game was designed for children 5 and up.

In 1999, Gorilla Systems Corporation also partnered with Mattel Media (then known as Mattel Interactive) to develop a sequel for the PC called Detective Barbie 2: The Vacation Mystery. The following year, another sequel called Detective Barbie: The Mystery Cruise by Runecraft, Ltd and Mattel Interactive was released for the Playstation.

== Reception ==
=== Sales ===
On December 5, 1998, Detective Barbie in the Mystery of the Carnival Caper was the ninth bestselling computer game, based on sales information compiled by PC Data from 13 software retail chains in the US. PC Data also noted that total sales for all "games for girls", including Detective Barbie, increased from 518,542 individual units in 1997 to 1,021,857 units in 1998, representing a year-over-year percentage change of 97%. Mattel created "tie-ins" on their website and also started advertising these games on television for the first time in 1998.

Detective Barbie and 19 other titles were also bundled with a Barbie-branded PC that was silver with "pink and purple floral accents" and manufactured by Patriot Computers. The Barbie PC and games bundle released in September 1999 and included a Barbie digital camera and a 15-inch monitor, but defective power supplies in the computers forced the company to delay shipments. At the time, Mattel also faced criticism for including more educational titles in the boys' version of the PC (a Hot Wheels edition) versus the girls' Barbie version. Dana Henry, a spokesperson from Mattel, responded that both PCs had almost the same number of programs, but the girls' PC had to make room for all of the popular Barbie titles, including Detective Barbie.

=== Critical reception ===
Reception

Review scores
Publication	Score
All Game Guide	3.5/5
Complete Sourcebook on Children's Interactive Media	3/5
SuperKids	3.5/5, 3.8/5, 4/5 (Note: No overall score was given. Subscores include Educational Value (3.5/5), Kid Appeal (3.8/5), and Ease of Use (4/5).)

In the Los Angeles Times, Aaron Curtiss praised the gameplay in Detective Barbie and said the game had "cheesy 'Clutch Cargo'-style animation". He wrote that gameplay was simple yet challenging and anticipated that it would not be too frustrating for children. PCMag and Anita Hamilton in Time both said Detective Barbie was fun. PCMag specifically touted its educational value, calling it "a great way for little girls to learn critical thinking and problem-solving skills" and comparing it to "a Nancy Drew-like storyline".

However, the authors of the Complete Sourcebook on Children's Interactive Media found that young testers had trouble using the game's controls and finding clues. The authors rated the game 3 out of 5 stars, calling it a "not-so-exciting mystery". Similarly, while they enjoyed the game's graphics, young testers for SuperKids also had difficulty finding clues and progressing in the game, and many of them gave up.

=== Retrospective assessment ===
Looking back on Detective Barbie for The Daily Beast over 20 years after its release, Caroline Madden called it "god-tier" and praised the game's "slinky music" and interactive attractions. She also admitted that the antagonist in the game (a "creepy prowler") terrified her when she was little. In Wired magazine, Drew Dakessian wrote that girl games like Detective Barbie are "founts of female empowerment" and shared that she felt a sense of autonomy and independence when she played the game as a kid. Claire Lewis of Polygon stated that the game had a "surprising level of depth" and served as a gateway to the horror video game genre.
