= Hot Wheels: Burnin' Rubber =

2001 video game

- Cover art of North American version featuring Krazy 8s
- Developer: Altron
- Publishers: THQ; Altron (Japan)
- Director: Masakazu Ishikawa
- Producer: Masakazu Ishikawa
- Programmers: Yoshito Shimada; Mitsuhiro Niioka
- Artists: Masakazu Ishikawa; Takashi Ikegami; Toshihiko Yurumi; Emiko Yoshikawa; Mari Aota; Hiroyuki Aoki
- Composer: Tomoyoshi Sato
- Series: Hot Wheels
- Platform: Game Boy Advance
- Release: NA: November 20, 2001; EU: February 22, 2002; JP: July 19, 2002
- Genre: Racing
- Modes: Single-player, multiplayer

Hot Wheels: Burnin' Rubber (released in Japan as Hot Wheels Advance) is a 2001 racing video game developed by Altron and published by THQ for the Game Boy Advance. The game is based on the Hot Wheels toy series.

== Gameplay ==
Hot Wheels: Burnin' Rubber is played with a third-person perspective set behind the player's vehicle. The game features 25 playable vehicles, each one based on a Hot Wheels toy car from 2000 and 2001. Each vehicle is individually rated in categories of acceleration, handling, and top speed. The player begins with five vehicles, while the other 20 must be unlocked. The player can earn money during races. In between races, the player can use the money to fine-tune the chosen vehicle with upgrades such as brakes, computer chips, engines, mufflers, rear ends, suspension, and tires. The game includes 16 race tracks set in various locations, including a beach, a desert, a casino, a pond, a dining table, a piano, and a bathroom.

Hot Wheels: Burnin' Rubber includes four gameplay modes. In Grand Prix mode, the player must advance through races set in each of the game's locations. During this mode, new vehicles and courses are unlocked for use in other modes. In Cup Select, the player races against others to win a championship cup. In Free Race, the player is allowed to freely drive around any chosen track. In Time Trial, the player must beat certain time limits for an opportunity to unlock new vehicles. The player's progress is saved to the game's built-in battery. The game also includes a two-player option that requires the system's Game Link Cable.

== Development ==
Hot Wheels: Burnin' Rubber was developed with a slightly modified version of the game engine used for GT Advance Championship Racing, which was also published by THQ and developed by Altron. Gameplay is similar to GT Advance Championship Racing, although the developers added more high jumps and arcade-style shortcuts, as well as a battery-save feature. The game was announced in September 2001, when it was sent to Nintendo for approval.

== Release ==
Hot Wheels: Burnin' Rubber was released in North America on November 20, 2001, and was later released in Europe on February 22, 2002. In Japan, Altron published the game on July 19, 2002, with the title Hot Wheels Advance.

== Reception ==
On review aggregator platform Metacritic, Hot Wheels: Burnin' Rubber has a score of 66 percent, indicating "mixed or average reviews".

Craig Harris of IGN rated the game 8 out of 10 and praised its use of a battery-save feature, which was missing in GT Advance. Harris wrote that Hot Wheels: Burnin' Rubber "is, essentially, THQ's 'apology' for what it did with GT Advance. Hot Wheels: Burnin' Rubber is, at its core, GT Advance with Hot Wheels vehicles instead of licensed automobiles, and fantasy locations instead of real-world tracks". Harris noted that the game had the same "excellent, tight power-sliding control and handling gameplay of GT Advance", and said that his "only real gripe about this game is its more sloppy interface", in comparison to GT Advance.

Patricia Wiley of GameZone also rated the game 8 out of 10, and praised the large selection of vehicles and race tracks, but noted that certain courses were "frustratingly difficult". Wiley also praised the quality of the game's background songs and sound effects, but she viewed several of them being the same. Nintendo Power rated the game 2.5 out of 5 and noted the large diversity of unlockable levels and vehicles. AllGame gave the game two and a half stars out of five.
