= Game Boy =

Handheld Nintendo game console

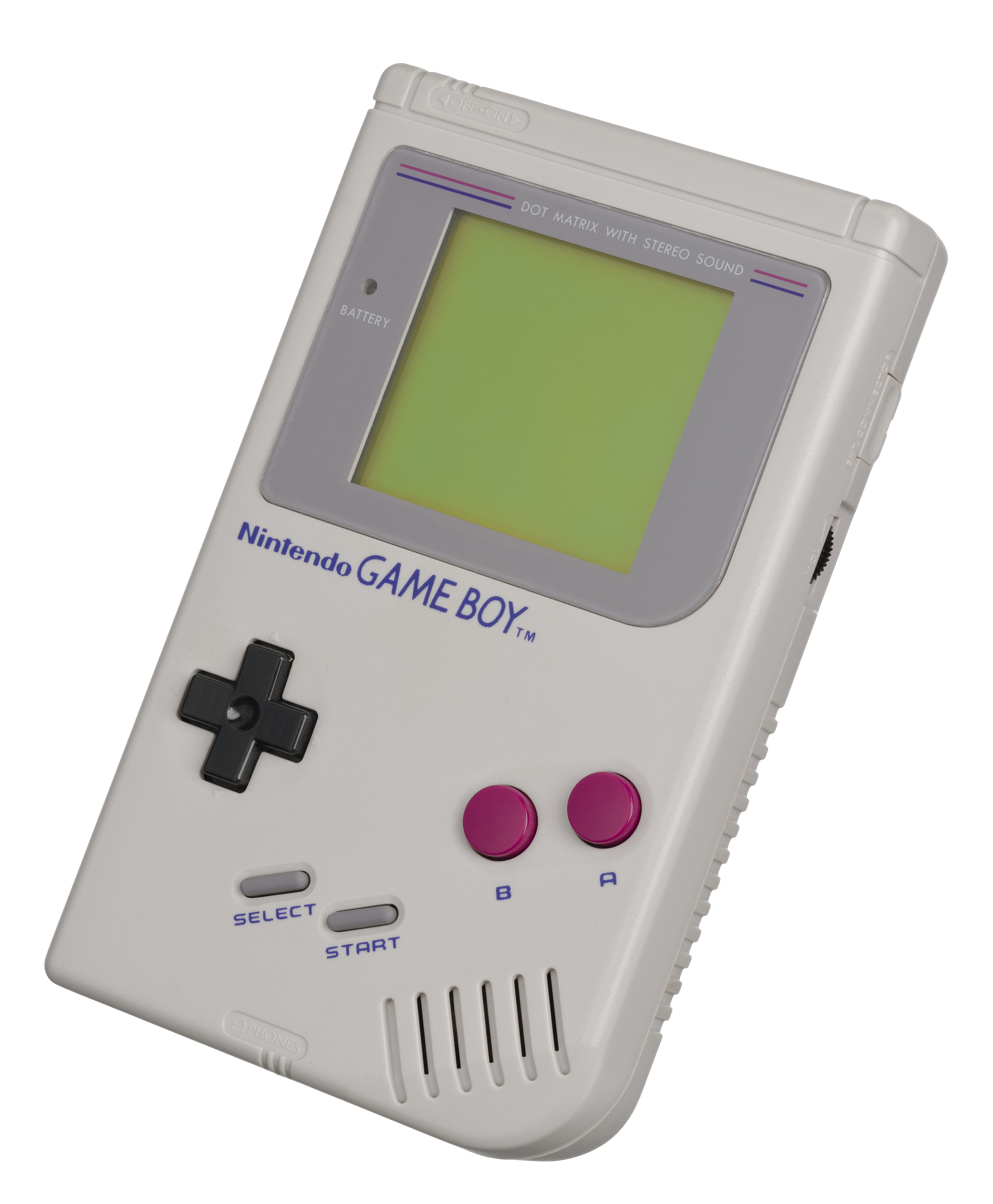
- Original Game Boy in grey
- Also known as: DMG-01: KR: Mini Comboy
- Developer: Nintendo R&D1 (Note: Nintendo Research & Engineering developed the Game Boy Light.)
- Manufacturer: Nintendo
- Product family: Game Boy
- Type: Handheld game console
- Generation: Fourth
- Released: April 21, 1989: Game Boy: JP: April 21, 1989; NA: July 31, 1989; EU: September 28, 1990 Game Boy Pocket: JP: July 20, 1996; NA: September 2, 1996 Game Boy Light: JP: April 14, 1998
- Introductory price: ¥12,500 (equivalent to ¥15,594 in 2024); US$89.99 (equivalent to $234 in 2025); £69.99 (equivalent to £173 in 2025)
- Discontinued: March 31, 2003
- Units sold: 118.69 million (including all variants and Game Boy Color)
- Media: Game Boy Game Pak
- System on a chip: Original: Nintendo DMG-CPU (Sharp LR35902); Pocket/Light: Nintendo CPU MGB
- CPU: Sharp SM83 @ 4.2 MHz
- Memory: 8 KB RAM, 8 KB Video RAM
- Display: Original: STN LCD; Pocket/Light: FSTN LCD; 160 × 144 px
- Power: Original: 4 × AA batteries (Up to 30 hours); Other models; Pocket: 2 × AAA batteries (Up to 10 hours); Light: 2 × AA batteries (Up to 12 hours w/ backlight on, 20 w/ backlight off)
- Dimensions: Original: 90 × 148 × 32 mm (3.5 × 5.8 × 1.3 in); Other models; Pocket: 77.6 × 127.6 × 25.3 mm (3.06 × 5.02 × 1.00 in); Light: 80 × 135 × 27 mm (3.1 × 5.3 × 1.1 in)
- Best-selling game: Pokémon Red, Blue, and Yellow (46 million) (list)
- Predecessor: Game & Watch; Computer Mah-jong Yakuman
- Successor: Game Boy Color
- Made in: Japan, China

The Game Boy (Note: Japanese: ゲームボーイ, Hepburn: Gēmu Bōi) is a handheld game console developed and marketed by Nintendo. It was released in Japan on April 21, 1989, followed by North America on July 31, 1989 and Europe on September 28, 1990. Nintendo's first handheld to use ROM cartridges, it succeeded the Game & Watch line of handheld electronic games and competed with Sega's Game Gear, Atari's Lynx, and NEC's TurboExpress in the fourth generation of video game consoles.

Nintendo Research & Development 1, under Gunpei Yokoi and Satoru Okada, designed the Game Boy. To expand on the single-game Game & Watch, Nintendo adopted a dot-matrix display and interchangeable game cartridges. They prioritized affordability, battery life, and durability over the faster processors and color graphics of its competitors; following Yokoi's philosophy of using mature, low-cost technology, the Game Boy has a monochromatic display and an 8-bit processor. It retains the Game & Watch D-pad and the Game Link Cable, developed by Okada, which enables multiplayer connectivity and data transfer between consoles.

In North America and Europe, the Game Boy was backed by a large marketing campaign and bundled with Tetris, which increased its appeal beyond traditional video game audiences. Although its monochromatic display and technical limitations drew criticism, the Game Boy's low price, long battery life, and extensive game library drove strong sales worldwide. The success of Nintendo's Pokémon series helped maintain its popularity late into the 1990s. Nintendo released multiple redesigns, including the smaller Game Boy Pocket (1996) and the Japan-exclusive, backlit Game Boy Light (1998).

Nintendo continued to support the Game Boy following the 1998 release of the Game Boy Color (GBC). The Game Boy is forward compatible with many GBC games, while the GBC and its 2001 successor, the Game Boy Advance, are backward compatible with Game Boy games. The Game Boy and GBC sold an estimated 118.69 million combined. They were the bestselling console at the time of their discontinuation in 2003, and remain the fourth-bestselling console as of 2025. Journalists credit the Game Boy with establishing handheld gaming as a mass-market category and for introducing video games to a generation of players.

== History and development ==
=== Background ===
The Game Boy was designed by Nintendo Research & Development 1 (R&D1), the team behind the Mario Bros. and Donkey Kong arcade games and the successful Game & Watch series of handhelds, which had helped stabilize Nintendo financially. By 1983, while Game & Watch remained popular internationally, sales in Japan had begun to decline, pressuring R&D1 to innovate. At the same time, they faced competition from Nintendo Research & Development 2 (R&D2), an in-house rival created by Nintendo president Hiroshi Yamauchi. That same year, R&D2 had launched the Family Computer, intensifying the pressure on R&D1. Looking to improve Game & Watch, R&D1 researched new screens from supplier Sharp, including dot-matrix displays that could support multiple games—unlike Game & Watch, which used pre-printed segmented LCDs, limiting each device to a single game.

=== Start of development ===
On June 10, 1987, division director Gunpei Yokoi informed R&D1 that Yamauchi wanted a successor to Game & Watch priced under ¥10,000 (equivalent to ¥12,840 in 2024). From the very first meeting, the team knew they wanted to use a dot-matrix display and codenamed the project Dot Matrix Game (DMG), a name later reflected in the Game Boy's official model number: DMG-01.

Within R&D1, Yokoi championed "lateral thinking with withered technology", (Note: Japanese: 枯れた技術の水平思考, Hepburn: Kareta Gijutsu no Suihei Shikō) a design philosophy which eschewed cutting-edge technology in favor of finding innovative uses of mature technologies, which tended to be more affordable and reliable. This led to early clashes between Yokoi and his assistant director Satoru Okada. Yokoi envisioned a simple toy, akin to an advanced Game & Watch, while Okada pushed for a more powerful system with interchangeable cartridges—essentially a portable NES. Some within R&D1 believed Yokoi resisted the idea simply to avoid links to the NES, developed by their rivals at R&D2. Eventually, in a heated meeting, Yokoi relented, approving Okada's vision and giving him full responsibility for the project.

=== Choosing the hardware ===
Initially, R&D1 considered using a Ricoh CPU, similar to the NES, for potential compatibility. However, R&D2—then building the Super Nintendo Entertainment System (SNES)—blocked this, claiming it would strain Ricoh's resources. R&D1 suspected this was simply an attempt to hinder their project. Ultimately, they opted for a Sharp CPU. A key side effect of this choice was the CPU's built-in communication feature. In the early 1980s, Okada had worked on an earlier Nintendo project called Computer Mah-jong Yakuman that featured multiplayer gaming over a cable connection between two devices. He saw an opportunity to implement a similar feature. Despite skepticism from his team that the feature would be too difficult to use, he personally developed the Game Link Cable technology, which later enabled Pokémon's "battle" and "trade" game mechanics. The Game Boy also retained a key innovation from Game & Watch: the D-pad. Yokoi had designed it as a compact alternative to joysticks, making it ideal for handheld devices. Its use on the NES controller also helped ease the transition for players.

Early in development, R&D1 evaluated dot-matrix displays from Sharp but found them unsuitable due to severe ghosting. Seeking alternatives, they approached Citizen, Epson, Hosiden, Matsushita, and Seiko. Most declined, but Citizen, already producing LCDs for portable TVs, was eager to collaborate. The team was impressed by Citizen's chip-on-glass technology, which integrated the screen controller into the display, reducing cost and production time. They offered Nintendo a monochrome screen for ¥1,300 or a color version for ¥3,900. However, following Yokoi's philosophy, the team rejected color due to higher power consumption and cost, opting for a simple grayscale screen without a backlight. This decision proved wise, as competing color handhelds would suffer from poor battery life, giving the Game Boy a significant advantage.

However, Sharp was still an important partner, so Nintendo asked if they could match Citizen on technology and price. Sharp responded with vague answers on their screen technologies and quoted a price of ¥2,500 to ¥3,000 per screen. In response, Citizen lowered its price to ¥1,000. With Yamauchi's approval, R&D1 finalized a deal with Citizen on September 1, 1987. However, as Citizen's representatives left Nintendo's offices, they saw Sharp's team arriving for a meeting with Yamauchi. Without explanation, Yamauchi canceled the Citizen deal and awarded the contract to Sharp. To soften the blow, R&D1 fabricated a story, telling Citizen they were interested in buying color screens the next year, even drafting fake project documents. Citizen later supplied color screens for Sega's Game Gear, which had a design closely resembling Nintendo's fake project. Citizen never admitted to sharing the design.

=== Near cancellation ===
The R&D1 team soon discovered that Sharp was unprepared to make the screens they needed, leading to months of delays. Early prototypes with low-quality twisted nematic (TN) screens sparked internal skepticism, with some employees mockingly referring to the project as DameGame (with dame (だめ) meaning "hopeless" in Japanese). In the summer of 1988, R&D1 presented a prototype to Yamauchi, who immediately canceled the project, citing the poor visibility of the display. Team members argued that minor screen adjustments or a slightly higher budget could resolve the issue, but Yamauchi refused, leading them to suspect other teams had already convinced him the device would be a commercial failure. Furthermore, with the NES still thriving and the SNES on the horizon, a Game & Watch successor was no longer seen as essential.

Most of R&D1, including Okada, was reassigned. However, Yokoi remained committed to the project. Defying Yamauchi's decision, he continued refining the display. During discussions with a Sharp director involved in Game & Watch, the team learned of a super-twisted nematic (STN) display secretly in development. While it had a green tint and slightly lower contrast, it dramatically improved the viewing angle. Yokoi devised a plan. In a meeting with a Sharp board member, he pressed them about new technologies, leading them to reveal the STN display. R&D1 secured a prototype and installed it in a Game Boy.

Three months after canceling the project, Yamauchi was shown the STN prototype. Though still unimpressed by the screen, he approved the console for sale, perhaps influenced by delays in SNES development, which was now two years away from launch.

Using the STN display significantly increased production costs. To mitigate expenses, the team reduced the screen's size, though it was too late in development to shrink the console's overall dimensions. The target price of ¥10,000 was ultimately not met due to the cost of the display, and the Game Boy would retail for ¥12,500 (equivalent to ¥15,594 in 2024). To enhance the perceived value of the product, Yamauchi decided to include headphones and four AA batteries in the box, which cost Nintendo very little but made the Game Boy appear like a better deal.

=== Launch and success ===
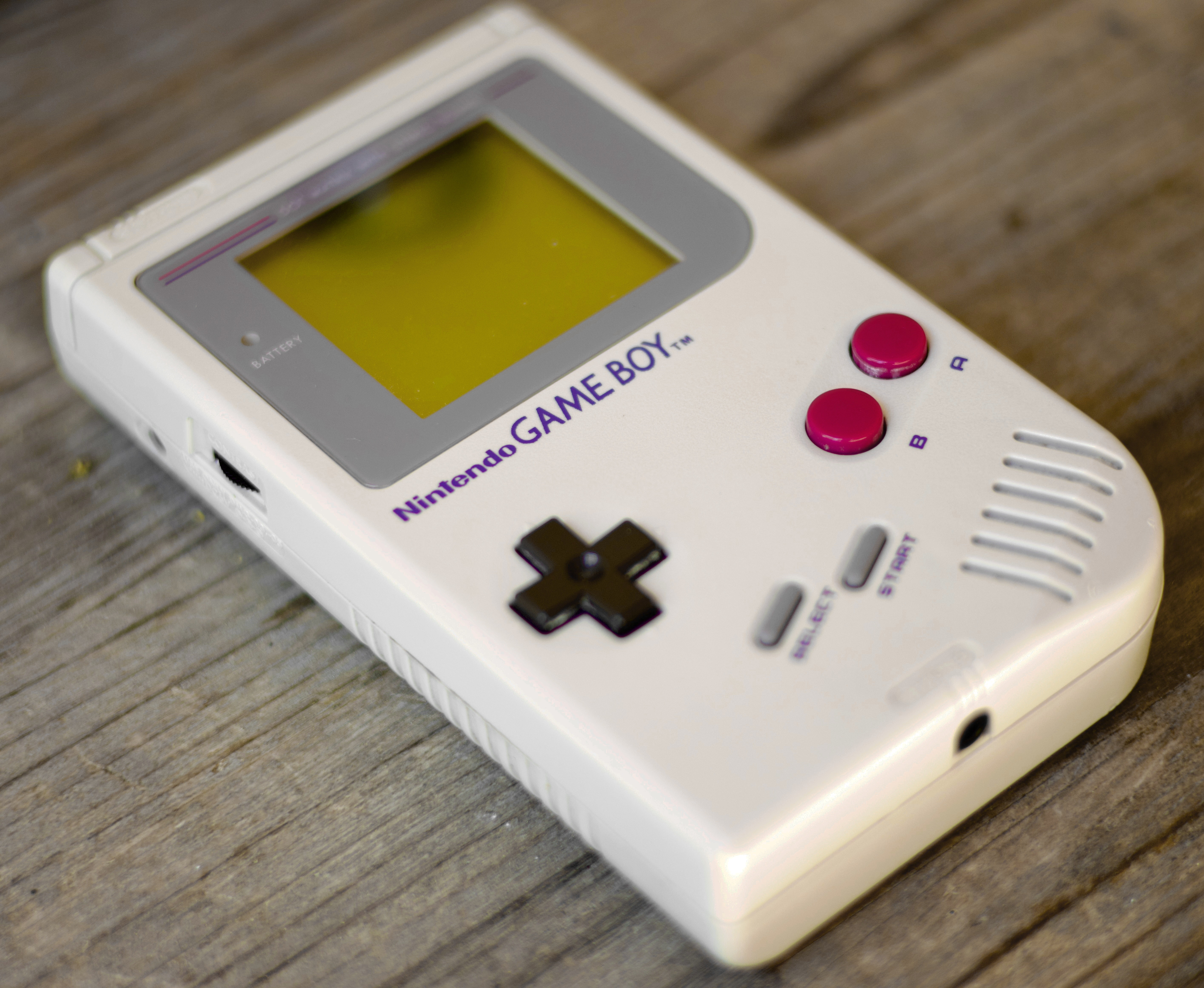
Original gray Game Boy

On January 17, 1989, Nintendo officially announced the Game Boy. It launched in Japan on April 21, selling out its initial production run of 300,000 units within the first two weeks. By August, sales had reached 720,000 consoles and 1.9 million games across just four launch titles. The Game Boy debuted in North America on July 31, 1989, at a retail price of US$89.95 (equivalent to $234 in 2025), and backed by a US$20 million marketing campaign (equivalent to $52 million in 2025) aimed at making it the must-have, hard-to-find holiday toy. On its release day, 40,000 units were sold, and within just a few weeks, sales reached one million.

Learning from one of the NES launch's shortcomings, Okada pushed to offer third-party developers a development manual and development kit, built by Intelligent Systems, to encourage software creation for the Game Boy. Meanwhile, R&D1 developed Super Mario Land as the console's flagship title, but another game captured the attention of Okada and Yokoi—Tetris. While a team within R&D1 was porting the Soviet-made puzzle game to the NES, they recognized its potential for a handheld platform. Although the Game Boy version of Tetris would not be ready for the console's Japanese debut, it was completed in time for its North American launch in July 1989. Henk Rogers, who had acquired the rights to Tetris, convinced Nintendo of America president Minoru Arakawa to make it the pack-in game with the Game Boy instead of Super Mario Land, arguing that while Mario primarily appealed to young boys, Tetris would appeal to everyone. As a result, Tetris was bundled with the Game Boy in every region except Japan.

== Hardware ==
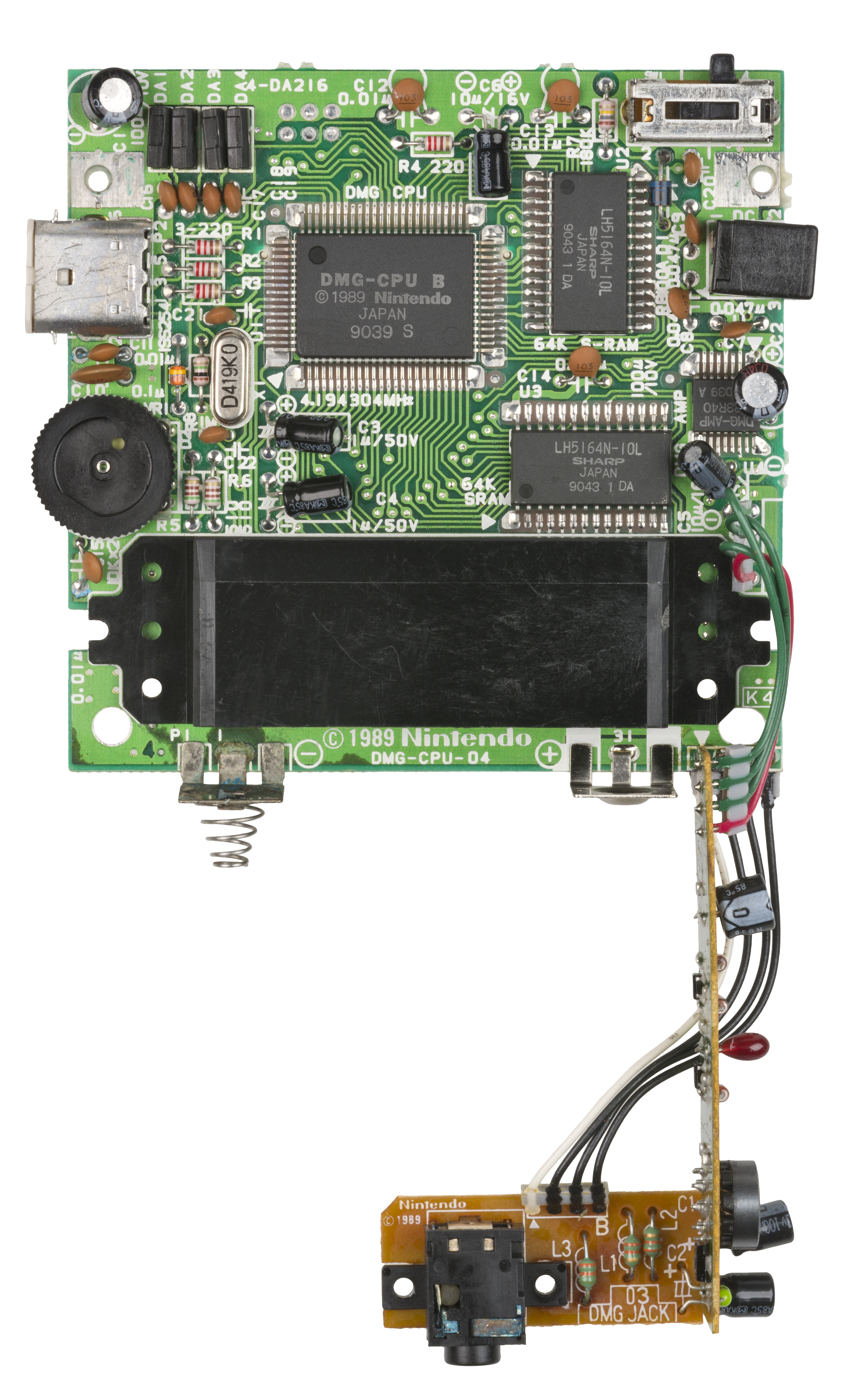
The original Game Boy motherboard

The Game Boy uses a custom system on a chip (SoC), to house most of the components, named the DMG-CPU by Nintendo and the LR35902 by its manufacturer, the Sharp Corporation.

Within the DMG-CPU, the main processor is a Sharp SM83, a hybrid of the Intel 8080 and Zilog Z80 processors. It combines the seven 8-bit registers of the 8080 (omitting the alternate registers of the Z80) with the programming syntax and additional bit manipulation instructions of the Z80. The SM83 also includes new instructions optimized for operations specific to the Game Boy's hardware arrangement. It operates at a clock rate of 4.194304 MHz.

The DMG-CPU also incorporates the Picture Processing Unit, essentially a basic GPU, that renders visuals using an 8 KB bank of Video RAM located on the motherboard. The display is a 2.5-inch (diagonal) reflective super-twisted nematic (STN) monochrome liquid-crystal display (LCD), measuring 47 millimeters (1.9 in) wide by 43 millimeters (1.7 in) high with a resolution of 160 pixels wide by 144 pixels high in a 10:9 aspect ratio. The screen displays four shades of grey/green.

Additionally, the SoC includes a 256 byte "bootstrap" ROM which is used to start up the device, 127 bytes of High RAM that can be accessed faster (similar to a CPU cache), and the Audio Processing Unit, a programmable sound generator with four channels: a pulse wave generation channel with frequency and volume variation, a second pulse wave generation channel with only volume variation, a wave channel that can reproduce any waveform recorded in RAM, and a white noise channel with volume variation. The motherboard also contains an 8 KB "work RAM" chip providing storage for general operations.

The Game Boy's physical controls include a D-pad (directional pad), four action buttons (labeled 'A', 'B', 'SELECT', 'START'), a sliding power switch with a cartridge lock to prevent accidental removal, along with volume and contrast dials on either side of the device. The case is made from ABS plastic. The original model weighs about 300 grams (11 oz) with batteries installed and measures 90 millimeters (3.5 in) wide, 148 millimeters (5.8 in) high, and 32 millimeters (1.3 in) thick.

The original Game Boy was powered internally by four AA batteries. For extended use, an optional AC adapter or rechargeable battery pack can be connected via a coaxial power connector on the left side. The right side also has a Game Link Cable (Note: The Game Link Cable port was also called the Video Link cable and extension connector in early Owner's Manuals.) port for connecting to up to four Game Boy devices for multiplayer games or data transfer. For sound output, the Game Boy includes a single monaural speaker and a 3.5 mm headphone jack that offered stereo sound.

=== Revisions ===
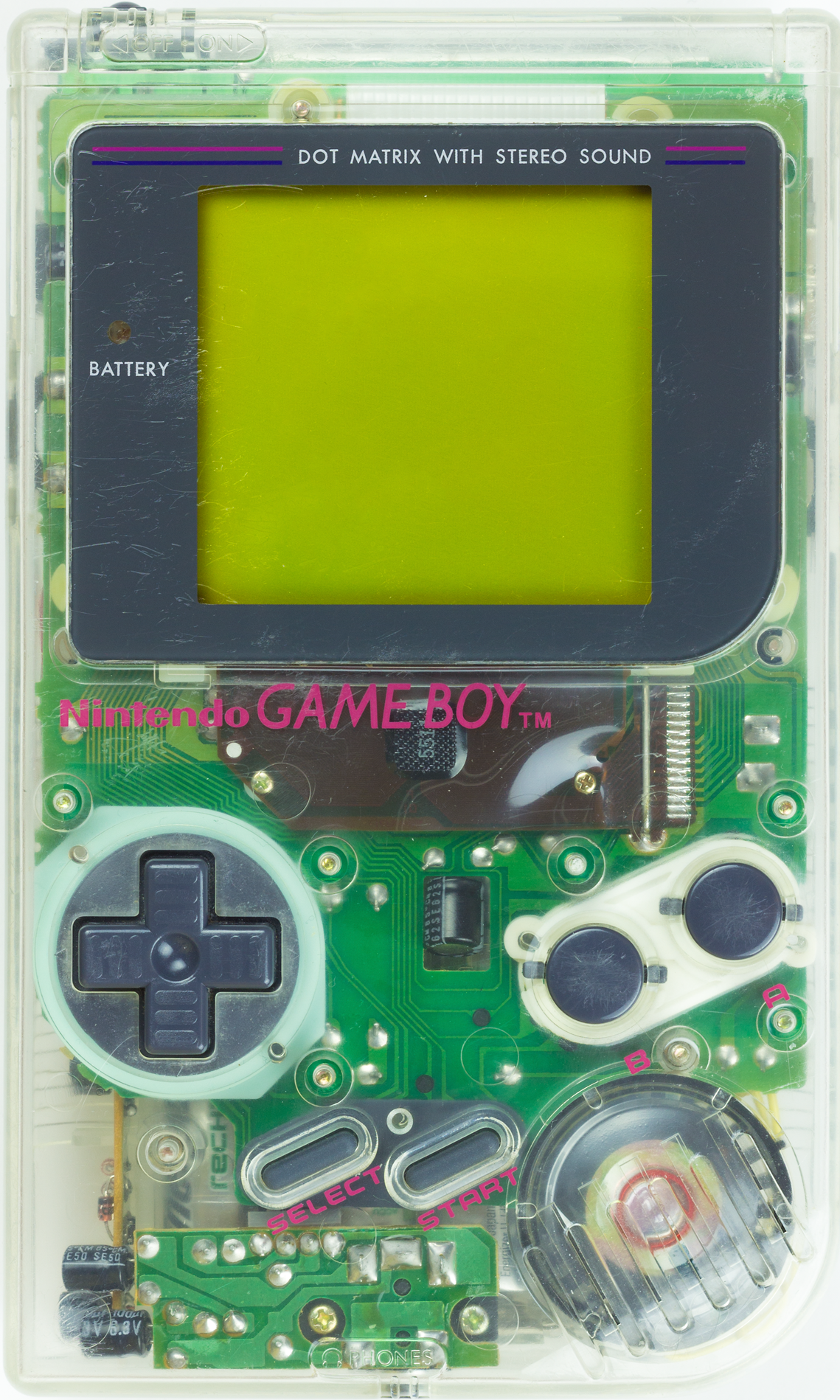
Clear "Play It Loud!" edition

The Game Boy remained a strong seller throughout the 1990s, driven by popular releases like Pokémon, which kept demand high. In the 1992 fiscal year, the Game Boy sold around 10 million copies. However, its continued success presented a challenge for Nintendo: while the hardware was aging, the company was reluctant to replace it due to its strong sales.

At a press conference in San Francisco on March 14, 1994, Peter Main, Nintendo's vice president of marketing, answered queries about when Nintendo was coming out with a color handheld system by stating that sales of the Game Boy were strong enough that the company had decided to hold off on developing a successor handheld for the near future. Instead, Nintendo would introduce several updates over the following years to extend the system's relevance.

==== Play It Loud! ====
The first update to the Game Boy's hardware design came on March 20, 1995, nearly six years after the console was first released, when Nintendo introduced various colored cases as part of the "Play It Loud!" campaign, known in Japan as Game Boy Bros. (Note: Japanese: ゲームボーイブラザーズ, Hepburn: Gēmu Bōi Burazāzu) This revision was purely cosmetic, with consoles available in red, yellow, green, blue, black, white, and transparent; with screens featuring a bezel in a darker shade of gray compared to the original model.

==== Game Boy Pocket ====
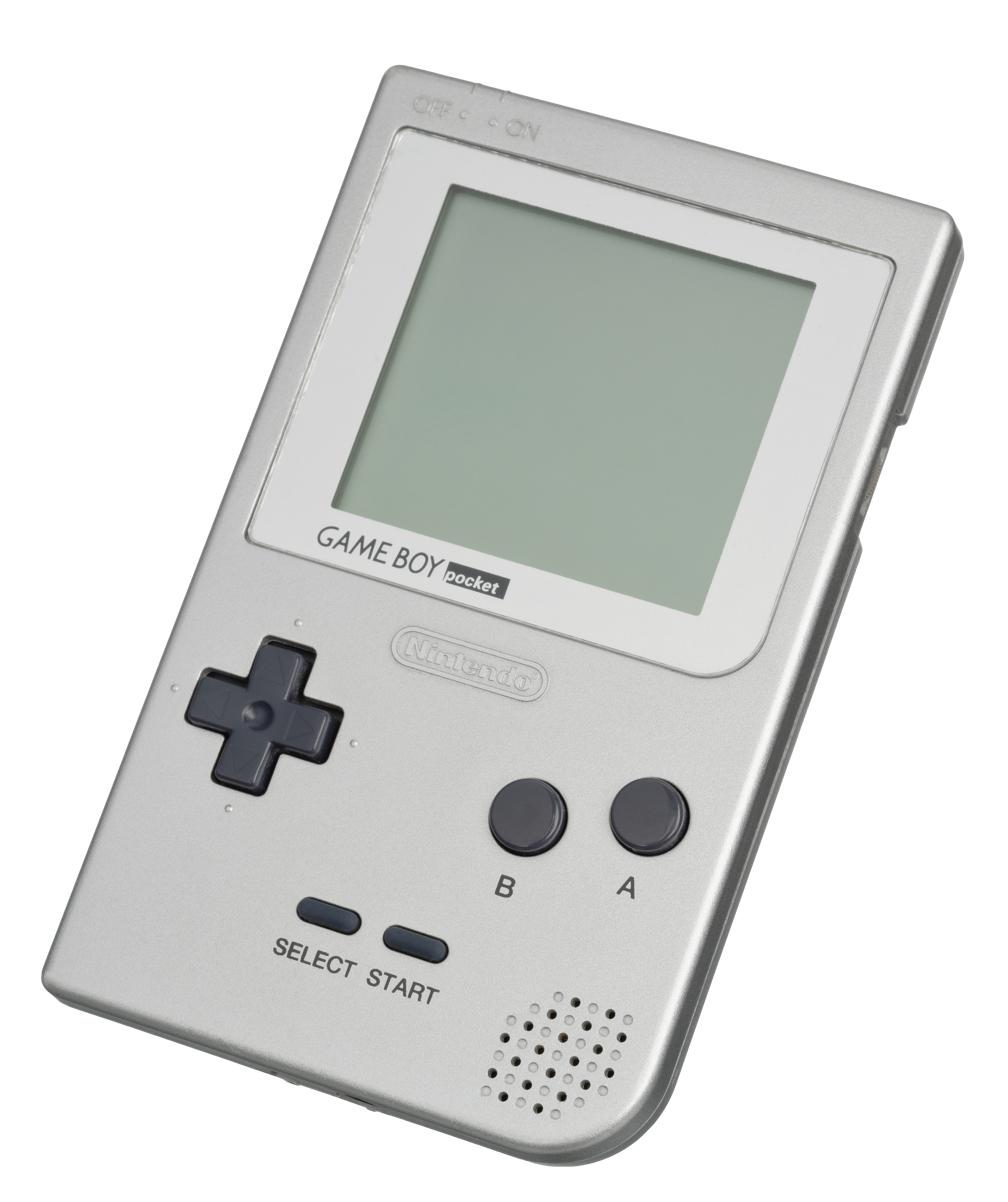

A major revision to the Game Boy came in 1996 with the introduction of the Game Boy Pocket, a slimmed-down unit that required just two smaller AAA batteries, albeit at the expense of providing just 10 hours of gameplay. The other major change was that the screen was changed to a much-improved film compensated super-twisted nematic (FSTN) LCD with a larger viewable area. The screen's visibility and pixel response-time had been improved, mostly eliminating ghosting. Additionally, the film compensation layer produced a true black-and-white display, rather than the green hues of the original Game Boy. The Pocket also has a smaller Game Link Cable port, which requires an adapter to link with the original Game Boy. This smaller port design would be used on all subsequent Game Boy models. Internally, the Game Boy Pocket had a new SoC, the CPU MGB, which moved the Video RAM from the motherboard to the SoC.

The Game Boy Pocket launched in Japan on July 20, 1996, and in North America on September 2, 1996, for US$69.99 (equivalent to $144 in 2025). The Game Boy Pocket helped to revitalize hardware sales and its release was ultimately well-timed as it coincided with the massively successful launch of Pokémon in Japan, which further fueled Game Boy sales. Reviewers praised the device's compact size and improved display, though some critics dismissed it as a minor upgrade with the Los Angeles Times remarking that Nintendo was, "repacking the same old black-and-white stuff and selling it as new". The device also faced criticism for its relatively short 10-hour battery life and the absence of a power LED, which had been used in previous models to indicate battery strength.

In early 1997, a revision was released featuring the return of the power LED, a broader range of case colors (red, green, yellow, black, gold metal, clear, and blue, in addition to the launch silver), and a price drop to US$54.95 (equivalent to $110 in 2025). By mid-1998, just before the launch of the Game Boy Color, the price had dropped further to US$49.95 (equivalent to $99 in 2025).

==== Game Boy Light ====
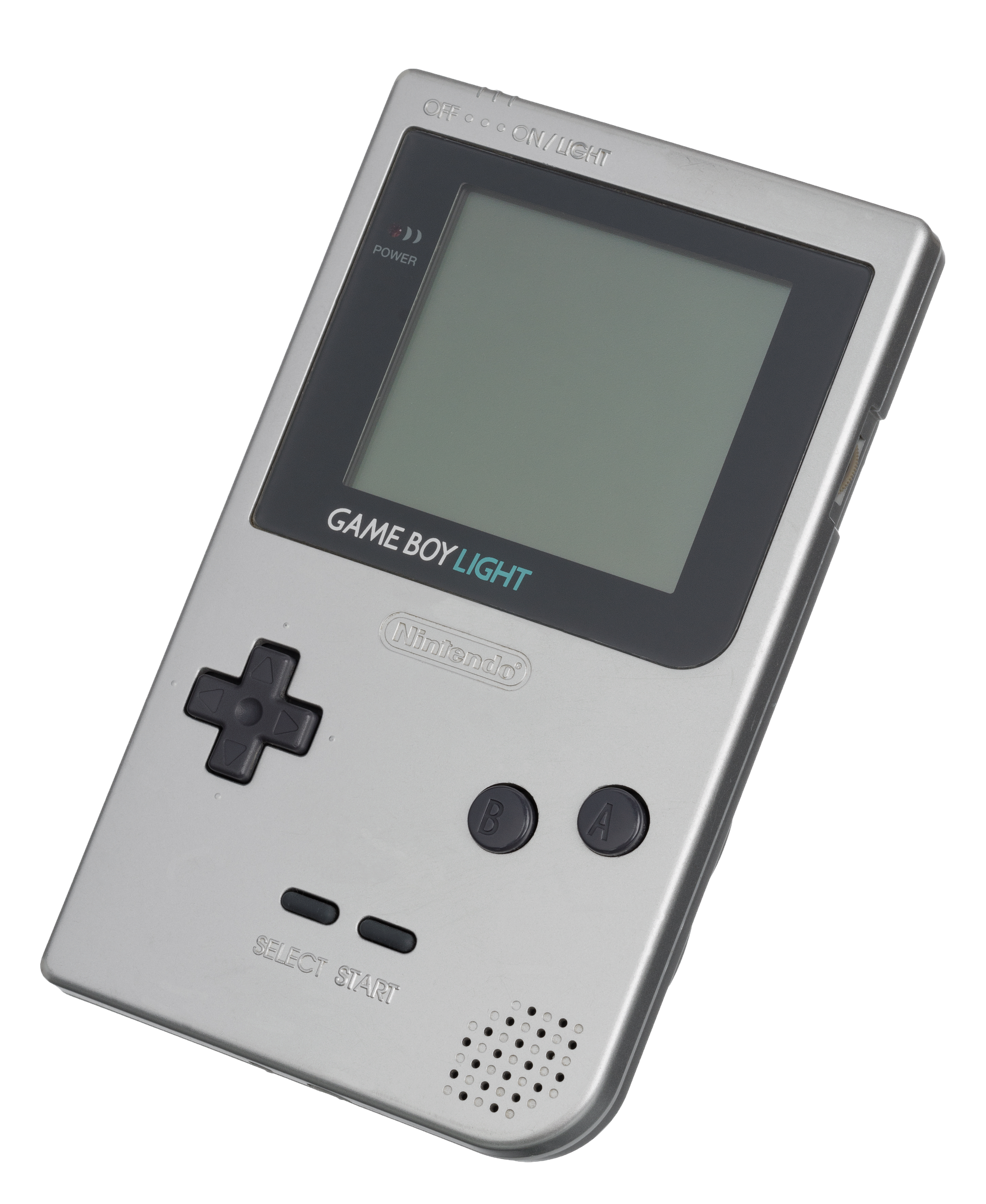

The Game Boy Light, released exclusively in Japan on April 14, 1998, retained all of the Pocket's improvements, including a more compact design and clearer FSTN LCD screen, while introducing several enhancements of its own. The most notable addition was an electroluminescent backlight, enabling gameplay in low-light conditions for the first time without external accessories. The backlight emitted a blue-green glow, similar to the illumination used in digital wristwatches at the time. To address the criticism of the Pocket's battery life, the Game Boy Light used two AA batteries with greater capacity, offering approximately 12 hours of gameplay with the backlight on and up to 20 hours with it off. These upgrades resulted in a slightly larger and heavier form factor compared to the Game Boy Pocket, though it remained significantly smaller and lighter than the original Game Boy. The Game Boy Light was available in gold and silver color variants and launched at a retail price of ¥6,800 (equivalent to ¥7,502 in 2024).

=== Technical specifications ===
	Game Boy	Game Boy Pocket	Game Boy Light
Height	148 mm (5 7/8 in)	127.6 mm (5 in)	135 mm (5 3/8 in)
Width	90 mm (3 1/2 in)	77.6 mm (3 in)	80 mm (3 1/8 in)
Depth	32 mm (1 1/4 in)	25.3 mm (1 in)	27 mm (1 1/8 in)
Weight	220 g (7.8 oz)	125 g (4.4 oz)	138 g (4.9 oz)
Display	2.5-inch reflective super-twisted nematic (STN) liquid-crystal display (LCD)	2.5-inch reflective film compensated STN (FSTN) LCD	2.5-inch FSTN LCD with electroluminescent backlight
Screen size (playable)	45.5 × 41.5 mm (1 3/4 × 1 5/8 in)	47.5 × 42.5 mm (1 7/8 × 1 5/8 in)	47 × 42 mm (1 7/8 × 1 5/8 in)
Resolution	160 (w) × 144 (h) pixels (10:9 aspect ratio)		
Refresh rate	59.727500569606 Hz		
Color support	2-bit, four shades of green: 0x0 0x1 0x2 0x3	2-bit, four shades of grey: 0x0 0x1 0x2 0x3	
System on a chip (SoC)	Nintendo DMG-CPU (Sharp LR35902)	Nintendo CPU MGB	
CPU	Sharp SM83 (custom Intel 8080/Zilog Z80 hybrid, 8-bit) @ 4.194304 MHz		
Memory	On SoC: 256 B ROM, 127 B High RAM, 128 B Audio RAM, 1.12KB object attribute RAM; Internal: 8 KB RAM, 8 KB Video RAM	On SoC: 256 B ROM, 127 B High RAM, 8 KB Video RAM, 128 B Audio RAM, 1.12KB object attribute RAM; Internal: 8 KB RAM	
Memory	External: (in the game cartridge) up to 1 MB ROM, up to 128 KB RAM		
Power	Consumption: 70–80 mA; Internal: 4 × AA batteries; External: 0.7 W at 6 V DC from 3.5 mm × 1.35 mm coaxial connector	Consumption: 80–90 mA; Internal: 2 × AAA batteries; External: 0.7 W at 3 V DC from 2.35 mm × 0.75 mm coaxial connector	Internal: 2 × AA batteries; External: 0.6 W at 3 V DC from 2.35 mm × 0.75 mm coaxial connector
Battery life	Up to 30 hours	Up to 10 hours	Up to 20 hours (backlight off); Up to 12 hours (backlight on)
Sound	Channels: 2 pulse wave, 1 wave, 1 noise; Outputs: Built-in mono speaker, stereo 3.5mm headphone jack		
I/O	Game Link Cable (8 kbit/s between up to 4 devices); Game Boy Game Pak slot		
Controls	4-way D-pad; Four action buttons (A, B, Start, Select); Volume potentiometer; Contrast potentiometer; Power switch		

== Games ==
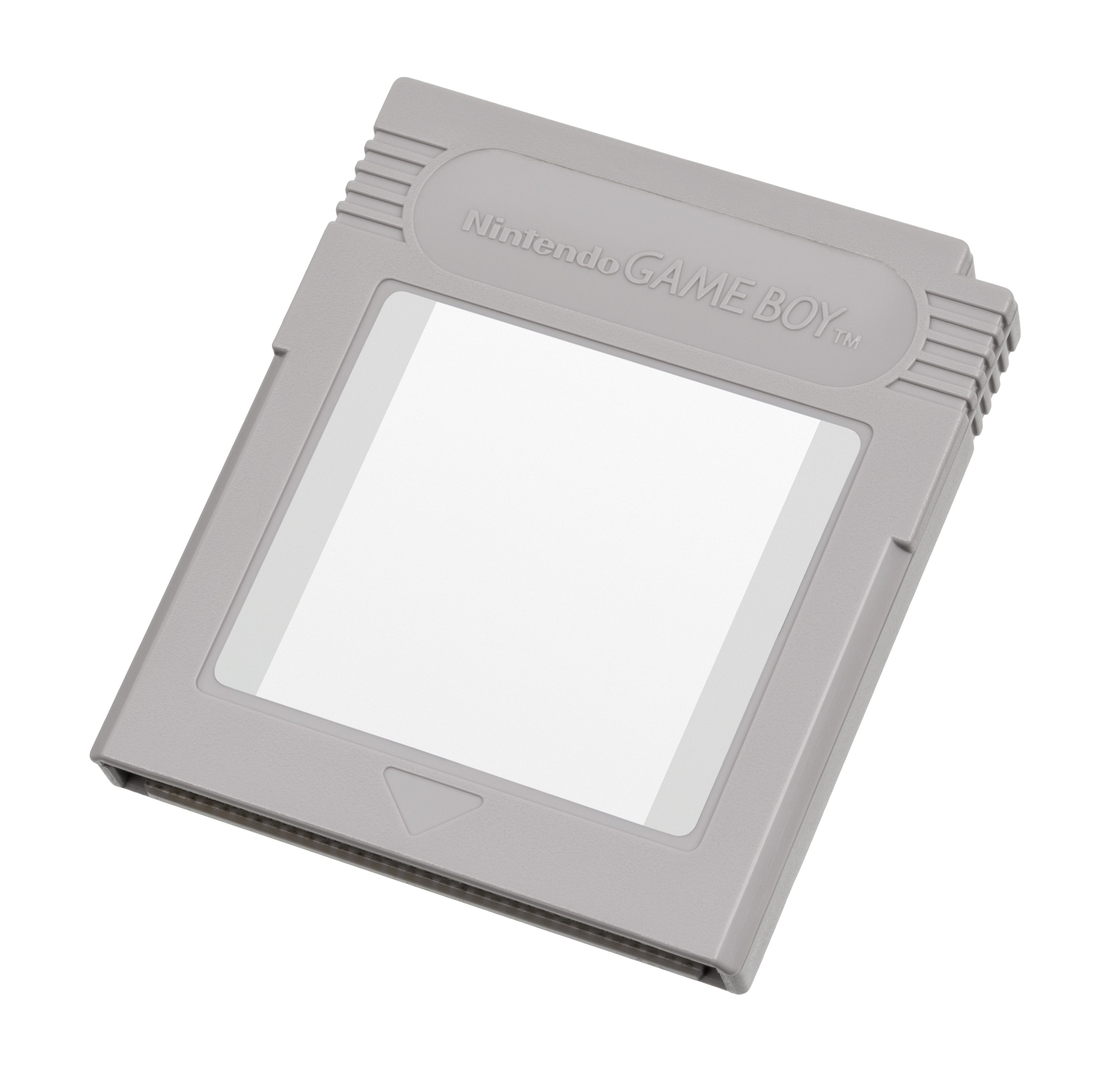
The standard gray Game Boy Game Pak

More than 1,000 games were released for the Game Boy, excluding cancelled and unlicensed games. Additionally, the monochrome Game Boy models were forward compatible with more than 300 games developed for the Game Boy Color.

Games are stored on cartridges called the Game Boy Game Pak, using read-only memory (ROM) chips. Initially, due to the limitations of the 8-bit architecture of the device, ROM size was limited to 32 KB. However, Nintendo overcame this limitation with a Memory Bank Controller (MBC) inside the cartridge. This chip sits between the processor and the ROM chips. The CPU can only access 32 KB at a time, but the MBC can switch between several banks of 32 KB ROM. Using this technology, Nintendo created Game Boy games that used up to 1 megabyte of ROM. Game Paks could also provide additional functionality to the Game Boy system. Some cartridges included up to 128 KB of RAM for more complex game mechanics. RAM chips in game paks could also be battery-backed to save progress when the handheld was off, real-time clock chips could keep track of time even when the device was off and Rumble Pak cartridges added vibration feedback to enhance gameplay.

The top-selling franchise for the Game Boy were Pokémon Red, Blue, and Yellow, the first installments of the Pokémon video game series, which sold more than 46 million copies. The best-selling single game was Tetris, with more than 35 million copies shipped, it was a pack-in game included with the purchase of many original Game Boy devices.

Beyond the platform's official titles, as of 2025, an active online community continues to create new games for the Game Boy and Game Boy Color through tools like GB Studio, a free and user-friendly game-building engine that simplifies the process compared to manual coding.

=== Launch titles ===
When the Game Boy launched in Japan in April 1989, it featured four launch titles: Alleyway (a Breakout clone), Baseball (a port of the NES game), Super Mario Land (an adaptation of the Mario franchise for the handheld format) and Yakuman (a Japanese mahjong game). When the console debuted in North America, two additional launch titles were added: Tetris and Tennis (another NES port), while Yakuman never saw a wide international release.

== Reception ==
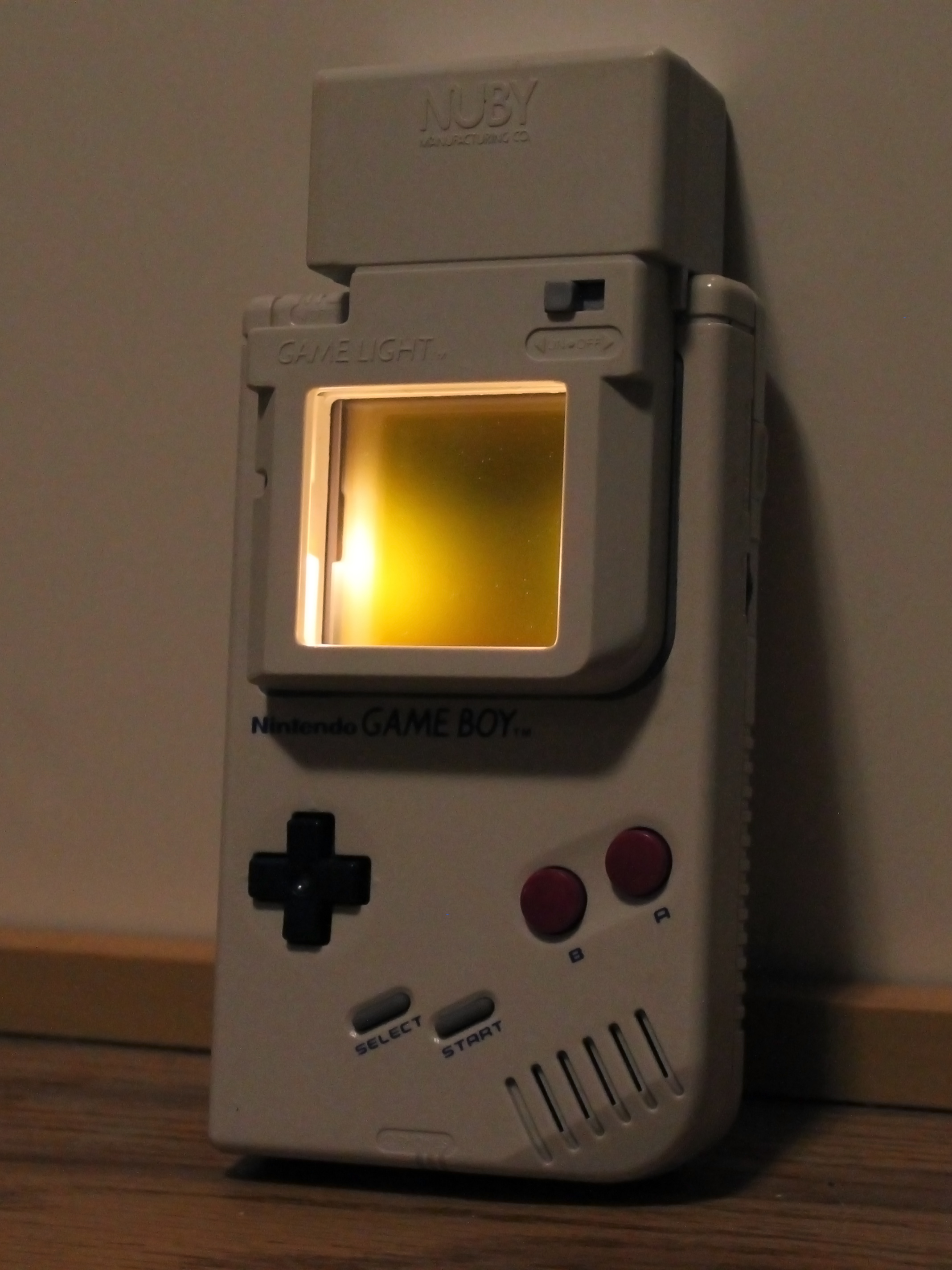
One common criticism of the original Game Boy was its lack of a backlight, prompting third-party accessories to make play possible in low-light conditions.

=== Critical reception ===
Though it was less technically advanced than the Game Gear, Atari Lynx, NEC TurboExpress and other competitors, notably by not supporting color, the Game Boy's lower price along with longer battery life made it a success.

The console received mixed reviews from critics. In a 1997 year-end review, a team of four Electronic Gaming Monthly editors gave the Game Boy scores of 7.5, 7.0, 8.0, and 2.0. The reviewer who contributed the 2.0 panned the system due to its monochrome display and motion blur, while his three co-reviewers praised its long battery life and strong games library, as well as the sleek, conveniently sized design of the new Game Boy Pocket model.

=== Sales ===
The Game Boy launched in Japan on April 21, 1989, with an initial shipment of 300,000 units, which sold out within two weeks. In the United States, 40,000 units were sold on its release day, July 31, 1989, and sales reached one million within weeks. By 1995, Nintendo of America reported that 46% of Game Boy players were female, a higher proportion than for the Nintendo Entertainment System (29%) and Super Nintendo Entertainment System (14%).

Over 59.89 million units of the various monochrome Game Boy models had been sold worldwide as of 30 September 1997, later increasing to 64.42 million units in late 1998 before the launch of the Game Boy Color. Nintendo subsequently reported only combined sales figures for the Game Boy and Game Boy Color. By the time of the system's discontinuation in 2003, the monochrome Game Boy models and the Game Boy Color had sold a combined total of 118.69 million units globally: 32.47 million in Japan, 44.06 million in the Americas, and 42.16 million in other regions.

At the time of its discontinuation, the Game Boy line was the best-selling game console of all time. It was later surpassed by the Nintendo DS, PlayStation 2, and Nintendo Switch, making it the fourth-best-selling console as of 2025.

=== Cultural legacy ===
Beyond its commercial success, the Game Boy has had a lasting cultural impact. It helped popularize handheld gaming, birthed new IP that is celebrated today, and the system is frequently cited in retrospectives as a gateway to gaming for a generation of players.

Smithsonian Magazine describes the Game Boy as a permanent fixture of American cultural history, citing its economic significance and enduring appeal. Reflections in The Guardian characterize it as "a portal to other magical worlds", with players recalling formative gaming experiences.

An original 1989 Game Boy is on display at the Smithsonian's National Museum of American History as part of the "American Enterprise" exhibition, alongside early mobile devices. It is also featured in the Nintendo Museum in Kyoto, Japan. In 2009, the Game Boy was inducted into the U.S. National Toy Hall of Fame.

The Game Boy has become a staple within the chiptune scene as hardware for composing music through homebrew music trackers such as Little Sound DJ and Nanoloop.

Lego created a set based on the Game Boy in partnership with Nintendo. The set came out in October 2025.
