= Hot Wheels Stunt Track Driver =

1998 video game

- Developers: Semi Logic Entertainments; Lucky Chicken Games (GBC)
- Publisher: Mattel Media
- Series: Hot Wheels
- Platforms: Windows; Game Boy Color
- Release: Microsoft Windows: NA: October 15, 1998; Game Boy Color: NA: January 2000; EU: June 2000
- Genre: Racing
- Mode: Single-player

Hot Wheels Stunt Track Driver is a racing video game developed by Semi Logic Entertainments and published by Mattel Media for Microsoft Windows. It is based on the Hot Wheels toy franchise, and was released on October 15, 1998. A Game Boy Color version, developed by Lucky Chicken Games, was released in 2000.

== Gameplay ==
=== Windows version ===
Gameplay consists of racing different Hot Wheels cars over six different tracks located inside and outside of the same house. The occupant of the house initially has tracks laid out in a living room, bedroom, attic, and sandbox. Completing certain challenges unlocks a further two: a greenhouse, and a game room. Twelve unique cars are available, with a number of them available only after completing challenges. The different cars have varying abilities with regard to speed, traction, and maneuverability, the last affecting the car's ability to perform stunts.

The player's car will jump through the air between sections of each race track, during which stunts can be performed. Stunts are an integral part of the game, as much as racing against the clock. As a car jumps between sections of track, the player can make the car spin around any axis: barrel rolls, end-over-end, or 360s, in either direction and in combination as well. Successful stunts give the car a speed and traction boost as it lands, which helps improve the player's time, signaled with a vivid graphic of lightning bolt-like effects on the wheels. Failure to land correctly after a stunt results in a crash, which does not end the race, but it costs time.

Crashes may be caused by loss of control, particularly on curves and inaccurate landings after a jump (even when no stunts are attempted, cars tend to twist out of control while aloft). Crashes may also result due to contact with different objects found on the tracks, including other cars; in two sequences, hazards are encountered off the track as the car passes through the walls between two mouse-holes, and across a billiard table. All crashes cost time while the car is replaced on the track.

There are three distinct modes of play: Practice, where the player can race through any available track to achieve best time; Championship, where the player must complete each track in sequence within a certain time limit; and Custom where the player's own track layouts can be constructed. Gold, silver, and bronze medals are awarded for best times on the supplied tracks. After all the main tracks are unlocked, a hidden track can be accessed.

=== Game Boy Color version ===
The Game Boy Color version features five playable cars and six household-themed race tracks. The game's vehicles are capable of performing stunts such as spins, rolls, and mid-air flips, all of which add bonus points and speed bursts. The game's vehicles are based on Hot Wheels toys; each one is rated differently for durability, speed, stunts, and turning. The game is played from a side-view perspective, and includes three gameplay modes: Tournament, Single Race, and Two Player. Tournament is the main game mode, in which the player races against two computer-controlled vehicles across several tracks. In Tournament, the player must finish in first place to advance to the next track. A password is provided to the player after each track is completed. The game's fifth vehicle is unlocked upon completion of Tournament mode. In Single Race, the player races against a time limit. Two Player mode allows two players to race against each other using the system's Game Link Cable.

== Development ==
The game was developed by Semi Logic Entertainments, a company based in California. The game was bundled with the Hot Wheels PC, a Hot Wheels–branded desktop computer released by Patriot Computers Corporation in partnership with Mattel.

== Reception ==
Reception

Aggregate score
Aggregator	Score
GameRankings	70%

Review scores
Publication	Score
AllGame	3.5/5
IGN	7/10

The Game Boy Color version was met with average reception, as GameRankings gave it 70% based on only 2 reviews.

Marc Nix of IGN, who wrote a positive review of the Game Boy Color version, said that "it's no portable Crazy Taxi, but the game is wild fun that doubles the excitement in two-player link-up mode". Nix praised the game for its "clean graphics" and "fair representations" of its Hot Wheels vehicles, although he noted the game's simplicity: "Unfortunately, there's little interaction with the game besides the stunt system -- enemy cars pass right through and you can't bash them off the road, there are no road obstacles or power-ups to make the game more difficult, and the different tracks are essentially the same other than some differences in number of jumps and difficulty. There's a useless brake button, which would have been much better suited for a more complex trick system or a weapon. [...] But like the Hot Wheels toy cars that this game patterns itself after, the plain joy of watching cars twirl and crash is a blast". Nix also praised the game for including link-up compatibility, a feature that was becoming scarce in Game Boy Color games.

Clayton Crooks of AllGame praised the PC version for its "excellent graphics and sound effects", as well as its "meticulously designed" Hot Wheels vehicles closely resembling their real-life counterparts. Crooks noted that the game would appeal to young children because of its simple gameplay, and wrote: "The music corresponds well with the style of gameplay but an option to turn it off after the repetition sets in would have been welcome".

Aaron Curtiss from the Los Angeles Times said "Simple as it may be, Stunt Track Driver never gets boring. Because players race against the clock, it can take several attempts to finish a track and move on to the next one. And then there are the stunts. Like the Dukes of Hazzard, most of these cars spend very little time with their wheels on the ground. Jumps offer the opportunity to spin the car around and collect extra points".

== Sequel ==
The game was followed by a sequel, Stunt Track Driver 2: Get'n Dirty, which is placed outside and reflects 4x4 off-road racing. It was released in 2000 and was made exclusively for Windows.
