= All Out of Love (disambiguation) =

"All Out of Love" is a 1980 song by Air Supply.

All Out of Love may also refer to:

- All Out of Love (musical), a 2018 jukebox musical based on the songs of Air Supply
- All Out of Love (TV series), a 2018 Chinese melodrama
- "All Out of Love", a 2002 song by H & Claire
