= Hot Wheels: Race Off+ =

2016 video game, relaunched in 2024

- Logo
- Developer: Hutch
- Publisher: Mattel
- Series: Hot Wheels
- Engine: Unity
- Platforms: iOS; Ended support: Android, tvOS
- Release: Initial release: Android: October 13, 2016 iOS: December 21, 2016 tvOS: March 1, 2017; Relaunched: iOS: December 5, 2024
- Genre: racing video game
- Modes: Single-player, multiplayer

Hot Wheels: Race Off, relaunched in 2024 as Hot Wheels: Race Off+, is a video game dedicated to Hot Wheels toy cars, developed by the British company Hutch Games. The game was initially released in 2016. In 2021, Hutch ended support for the game, and in 2024 it was relaunched and released in the Apple Arcade.

== History ==
The origins of the game trace back to when the manufacturer of Hot Wheels toy cars, the American company Mattel, approached the British company Hutch Games with a proposal to create a game. The companies then entered into a licensing agreement. The Hutch Games team spent an week at the Mattel office in Los Angeles to learn about the Hot Wheels brand.

The first version of the game (0.1.3442) was released on October 13, 2016 for Android platforms by Hutch Games. December 21, 2016, Hot Wheels: Race Off (version 1.0.4606) was released for iOS devices, and also appeared on the App Store and Google Play. On March 1, 2017, the game was released for tvOS. On March 2, 2021, the last update of the Hot Wheels: Race Off game was released (11.0.12232), after which Hutch Games announced the termination of service and support for the game.

On November 1, 2024, Hutch started a project called Hot Wheels: Race Off+. It was reported that Mattel was going to cooperate with the company again, and that the game would be released on December 5 in the Apple Arcade. On December 5, 2024, the full version of the game was officially released.

== Gameplay ==
The game has three modes:

- Daily Race Off (closed from March 2, 2021) — in this mode, the player will need to overtake 3 leaders on different tracks to receive rewards. At the same time, the player will have only 2 lives, and if he loses, they will be taken away. If the player loses both lives, the race ends and the player gets nothing.
- Multiplayer mode (closed from March 2, 2021) — in Hot Wheels: Race Off featured a multiplayer mode in which, after logging in via Google Play Games, you can play against other players from around the world.
- Single—player mode (currently available in all versions) is a single-player mode. In it, you can complete tracks, discover new stages and collections, and upgrade your car.

In the game, the player and another car race on a long straight track. The goal of the game is to overtake another car, try not to use up fuel and not roll over. At the same time, you can also receive coins that can improve your performance, such as speed, grip, and others.

== Reception ==
Harry Slater from Gamezebo noted the disadvantages of the game is that it will be too difficult for some people. On the plus side, he said that the game looks pretty good and it captures some of the zanyness of Hot Wheels.

Brad Ward from TalkAndroid said that the game has an "addictive playstyle which keep you coming back for more". He noted that the gameplay of the game is unique compared to other Android games, and that the game becomes more difficult with each level.
