= All Out War =

All Out War may refer to:

- All Out War (band), an American hardcore band
- All Out War (book), a 2016 book by Tim Shipman
- All Out War (album), a 2012 album by Incite
- All-Out War, a DC Comics publication
- All Out War, the title of the 20th and 21st volumes of The Walking Dead comic book series
- All Out War, the 1992 debut EP by Earth Crisis
- Total war, a war limitless in its scope
- Absolute war, a philosophical construct developed by von Clausewitz
