= Computer Mah-jong Yakuman =

Handheld electronic game made by Nintendo

- Developer: Nintendo R&D1
- Manufacturer: Nintendo
- Type: Handheld electronic game
- Generation: Second
- Released: JP: October 18, 1983
- Introductory price: ¥16,800 (equivalent to ¥22,691 in 2024)
- Display: Dot-matrix display
- Successor: Game Boy
- Related: Game & Watch

Computer Mah‐jong Yakuman (Note: Japanese: コンピュータ マージャン 役満, Hepburn: Konpyūta Mājan Yakuman) is a handheld electronic game simulating Japanese mahjong, released exclusively in Japan by Nintendo in 1983. Following the success of the simpler Game & Watch series, Nintendo aimed to attract an older audience with this more complex and strategy-driven device. However, its high price and limited functionality hindered its commercial success. Despite this, it introduced key innovations that would later be integral to the success of the Game Boy, including a dot-matrix display and multiplayer gaming via a link cable. It also marked the beginning of Nintendo's long-running series of mahjong video games, which would continue to bring Japanese mahjong to the company's future gaming platforms.

== History ==
Mahjong has existed since at least the 1800s and became widely popular in Japan from the 1920s onward after its introduction from China. Seeking to capitalize on this popularity, Nintendo developed a portable electronic version of the game. The device was created by Nintendo Research & Development 1, the team behind the Game & Watch and later the Game Boy.

Nintendo released Computer Mah-Jong Yakuman in 1983 for ¥16,800 (equivalent to ¥22,691 in 2024). Despite its technical innovations, it struggled commercially. It was priced nearly three times higher than a Game & Watch and even surpassed the cost of the Famicom home console, released the same year at ¥14,800 (equivalent to ¥19,990 in 2024), which had a mahjong game available.

== Overview ==
Computer Mah-jong Yakuman featured a black-and-white dot-matrix LCD and an intricate control system with 20 buttons, alongside a power switch and a screen contrast switch. Thirteen buttons corresponded to the tiles in a mahjong hand, while the remaining facilitated gameplay functions.

The device ran on four AA batteries but also supported an optional AC adapter sold separately for ¥1,000 (equivalent to ¥1,351 in 2024). It was also the first handheld Nintendo device to feature a link cable, sold separately for ¥2,000 (equivalent to ¥2,701 in 2024), that enabled two consoles to connect for head-to-head play.

The game simulated Japanese mahjong in a format tailored for electronic handheld play. While its controls reflected the game's complexity, the computer opponent followed relatively simple logic, making its play style predictable for experienced mahjong players.

== Legacy ==
Despite its commercial struggles, Computer Mah‐jong Yakuman holds an important place in Nintendo's history. As the company's first handheld device featuring a link cable for multiplayer play, it set a precedent for portable gaming connectivity, a concept that would later be refined with the Game Boy's Game Link Cable.
