= Pamela Haag =

American writer and historian

- Education: Yale University
- Occupations: Writer, historian

Pamela Haag is an American writer and historian.

== Education ==
Haag received a Ph.D. in History from Yale University in 1995, and a B.A. from Swarthmore College, where she graduated with Highest Honors. She also earned an MFA in creative nonfiction from Goucher College in 2008. She has held numerous fellowships, including a Mellon Fellowship in the Humanities, a National Endowment for the Humanities fellowship, and postdoctoral positions at both Brown and Rutgers universities.

== Career ==
Haag’s essays, books, and opinion address a broad range of topics.

Her first book was a scholarly monograph, Consent: Sexual Rights and the Transformation of American Liberalism (Cornell University Press, 1999). It discusses the "transition from classic to modern liberalism, and the cultural emergence of a concept of a right to privacy and sexual liberty, decades before the concept became legally prominent in the late 1900s".

Haag was the Director of Research for the AAUW Educational Foundation for five years and, while there, published research on girls' insights about their challenges in school life, called "Voices of a Generation" (Marlowe, 2000).

Marriage Confidential: Love in the Post-Romantic Age (HarperCollins, 2012), is cultural commentary about the state of 21st-century marriage. It explores the dilemma of the "semi-happy" couple—not miserable in marriage but not content, either—and it discusses how some couples are redefining marriage. Among others, The Washington Post reviewed it as "flat-out brilliant"; Publishers Weekly gave it a starred review, and it was chosen by the Huffington Post as one of the notable and important books of the season.

The Gunning of America: Business and the Making of American Gun Culture (Basic Books, 2016) highlights the gun industry rather than gun owners. The book delves into the historical archives of the Winchester and Colt’s corporations, and the ghostly legend of gun heiress Sarah Winchester. Gunning argues among other things that the gun mystique truly flourished and developed not on the frontier of the 1800s but in the urban, modern, “post-frontier” America of the 1900s. Haag pays particular attention to how the gun industry itself worked to build markets, both in the U.S. and, crucially, abroad. She argues that the gun shifted from something that Americans needed but didn't especially love in the 1800s to something that they loved but didn't especially need in the 1900s.

The Gunning of America was praised as "beautifully composed", "brilliant", "remarkable", and "masterful" in reviews, including The New Republic, The Washington Post, The Boston Globe, the San Francisco Chronicle, The New York Review of Books, Maclean's, Time, and others. It received a starred review in Publishers Weekly.

The Gunning of America was named a best book of 2016 by Kirkus Reviews, The Washington Post, and the San Francisco Chronicle, and an outstanding academic title by Choice. It was excerpted in The Wall Street Journal, Politico, and Salon.

Haag has also published in places such as: The American Scholar, NPR, The Christian Science Monitor, Slate, Huffington Post, Ms., The Washington Post, The Chronicle of Higher Education, New York Post, Michigan Quarterly Review, The Antioch Review, New Haven Review, and The Times (London), as well as peer-reviewed academic journals. Haag was also a regular columnist in 2012 and 2013 at Big Think.

== Selected works ==
=== Books ===
- Consent: Sexual Rights and the Transformation of American Liberalism (Ithaca: Cornell University Press, 1999)
- Voices of a Generation: Girls Talk about Their Lives Today (Marlowe: 2000)
- Marriage Confidential (New York: HarperCollins, 2011).
- The Gunning of America (Basic Books, 2016)
- Revise: The Scholar-Writer's Essential Guide to Tweaking, Editing, and Perfecting Your Manuscript (Yale University Press 2021)
