= Hot Wheels: All Out =

2006 video game

- North American cover art
- Developer: TwoFiveSix
- Publishers: Destination Software, ZOO Digital Publishing
- Series: Hot Wheels
- Platform: Game Boy Advance
- Release: NA: September 13, 2006; PAL: November 24, 2006
- Genre: Racing video game
- Mode: Single-player

Hot Wheels: All Out is a racing video game developed by British studio TwoFiveSix and published by Destination Software and ZOO Digital Publishing. It was released in 2006 exclusively for the Game Boy Advance.

== Gameplay ==
Cars have a turbo boost feature, which allows them to go faster for a period of time, and a slow motion button for difficult turns.

== Reception ==
Hot Wheels: All Out received very poor reviews, according to review aggregation website Metacritic. Dave Magliano, writing for Nintendojo, criticized the lack of Hot Wheels visuals and audio quality. Louis Bedigian stated it was "worth it for the kiddies, not for anyone else."
