= Game Link Cable =

Accessory for the Game Boy line

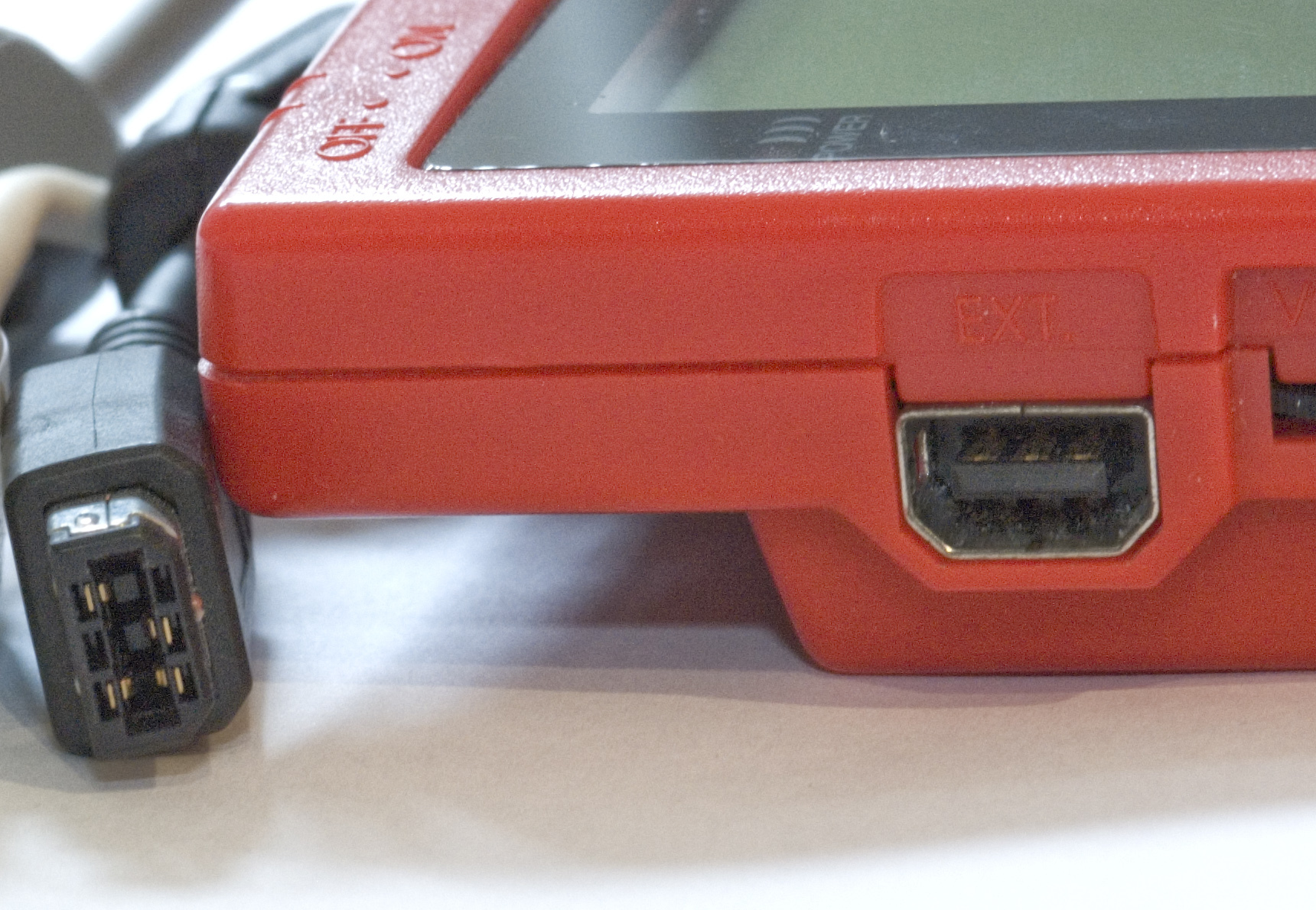
- A second generation Game Link Cable plug (left) and socket on a Game Boy Pocket (right)
- Type: Data transfer

Production history
- Designer: Nintendo
- Designed: 1989

Data
- Bitrate: First-generation: 8 kbit/s; Second generation: 8‍–‍512 kbit/s
- Max. devices: 4
- Protocol: Serial

Pinout
- Pinout looking at end of port (as seen looking at the side of the Game Boy)
| Pin 1 | V_{CC} | +5 V DC |
| Pin 2 | SO | Serial Out |
| Pin 3 | SI | Serial In |
| Pin 4 | SD | CPU Pin 14 (not used) |
| Pin 5 | SC | Shift Clock |
| Pin 6 | GND | Ground |

The Game Link Cable, (Note: Japanese: ゲームボーイ専用通信ケーブル, Hepburn: Gēmu Bōi sen'yō tsūshin kēburu; lit. 'Game Boy dedicated communication cable') also known as Video Link in early versions, is an accessory for the Game Boy line of handheld consoles. Introduced in 1989 alongside the original Game Boy, it was revised over four generations with varying degrees of backward compatibility. The cable enables data transfer and multiplayer gaming between up to four devices, supporting head-to-head competition, cooperative play, item exchanges, and unlockable features, depending on the game. The cable could also connect the console to external peripherals, most notably the Game Boy Printer. The port on Game Boy consoles is labeled "EXT" for Extension connector.

== Background ==
The Game Link Cable was championed by Satoru Okada, assistant director of Nintendo Research & Development 1, the team behind the Game Boy. In the early 1980s, Okada had worked on Computer Mah-jong Yakuman, a Nintendo handheld electronic game that utilized cable communication between two devices. Convinced that a similar feature could enhance the Game Boy, he strongly advocated for its inclusion. Despite skepticism from the team, who feared it would be too complicated and underutilized, Okada pushed forward and personally developed the Game Link Cable technology.

== First generation ==
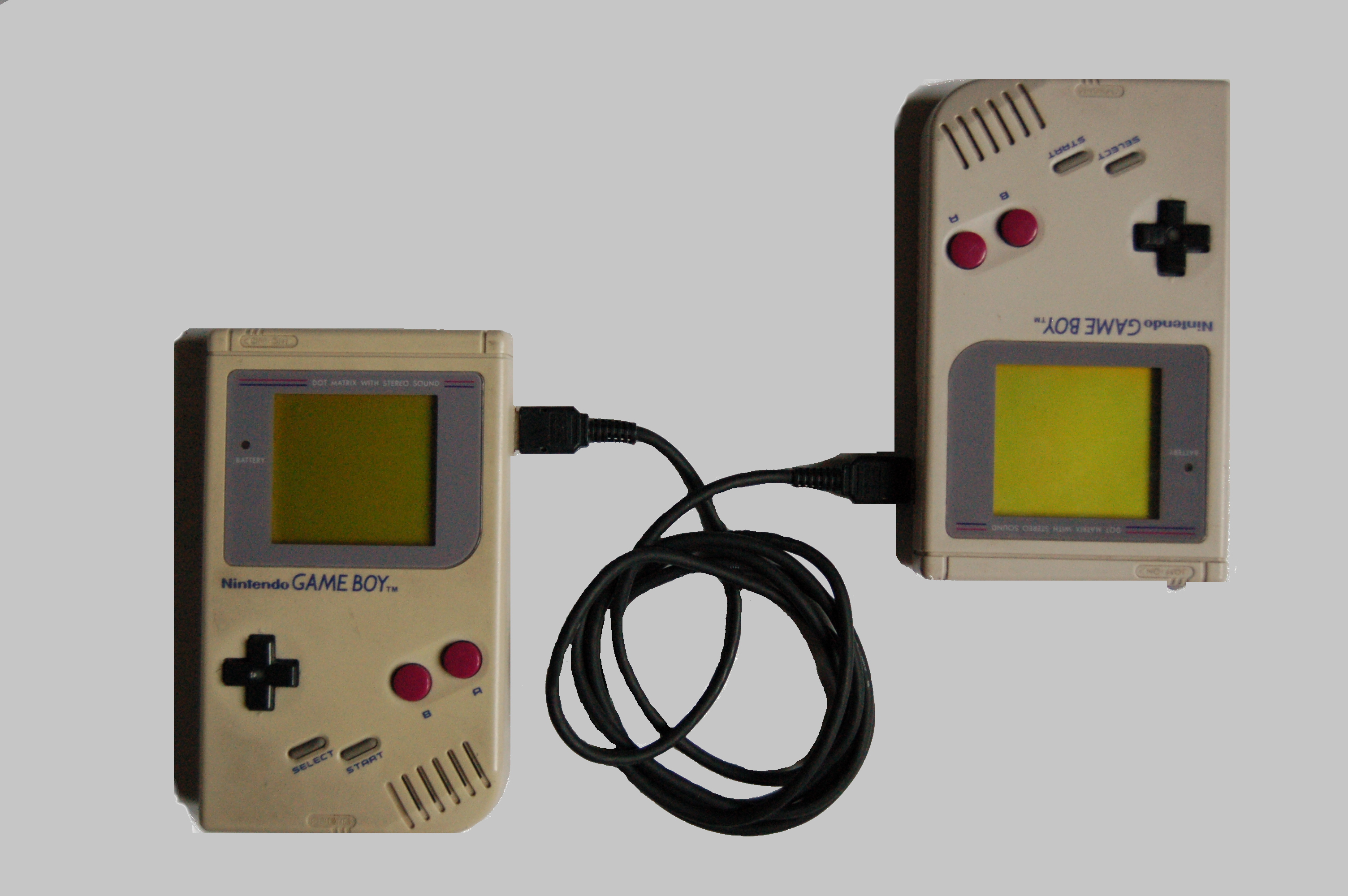
Two original Game Boy systems connected with a DMG-04

The first-generation Game Link Cable (model DMG-04) launched alongside the original Game Boy. Featuring "large" connectors on both ends, it linked two original Game Boy consoles for compatible multiplayer games identified by an icon on packaging and cartridges.

Yakuman, one of the four Japanese launch titles for the Game Boy was the first to utilize the Game Link Cable for multiplayer functionality.

Some games, such as F-1 Race, supported up to four players but required the Game Boy Four Player Adapter (model DMG-07) and three Game Link Cables.

== Second generation ==
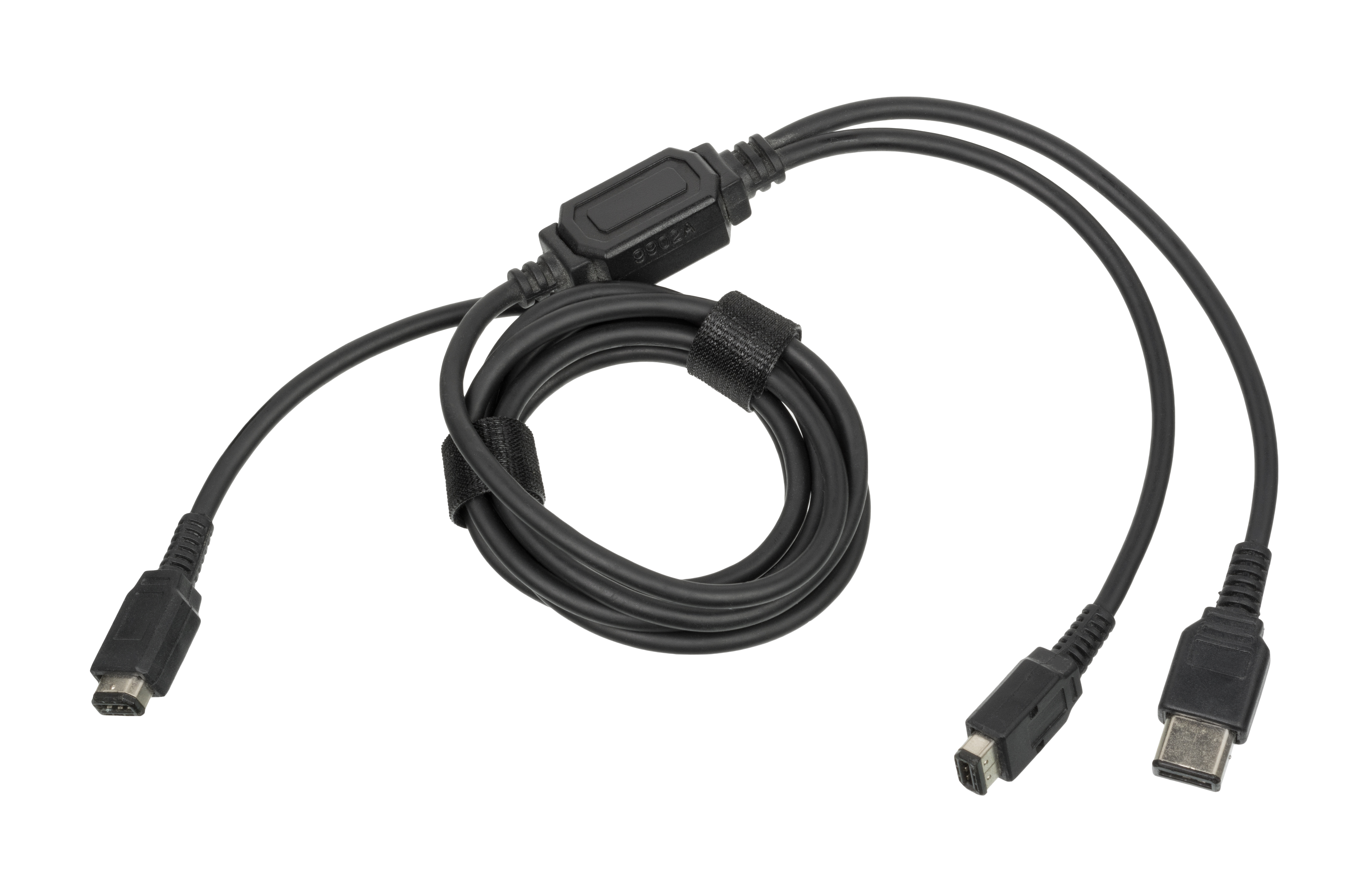
A second-gen Universal Game Link Cable (model MGB-010) with both first and second generation connectors on one end

The second generation started with the release of the Game Boy Pocket which used a much smaller Game Link connector than those used on the original Game Boy. Although the pin assignment and basic port shape remained the same, its much smaller size necessitated the release of new Game Link Cables. The Game Boy Light (a backlit Game Boy Pocket only released in Japan), Super Game Boy 2, and the Game Boy Color also used the same link cable port design.

The Game Boy Color offered a "high-speed" mode that enabled data transmission over the Game Link Cable at up to 512 kilobits per second, 64 times faster than the 8 kbit/s speed of earlier monochrome Game Boy models.

The second generation Game Link Cables came in a few varieties, but each serves the same purpose. The first was called the Game Boy Pocket Game Link Cable (model MGB-008) features the smaller second generation connectors on both ends. The second is called the Universal Game Link Cable (model MGB-010) and featured the smaller second generation connector on one end, and the cable splits into both a second generation and first generation connector at the other end (although only one connector at this end can be used at any given time). This link cable was included with the Game Boy Printer in the US and Europe but does not appear to have been available to buy separately. The third was called the Game Boy Color Game Link Cable (model CGB-003) and was functionally identical to the MGB-008.

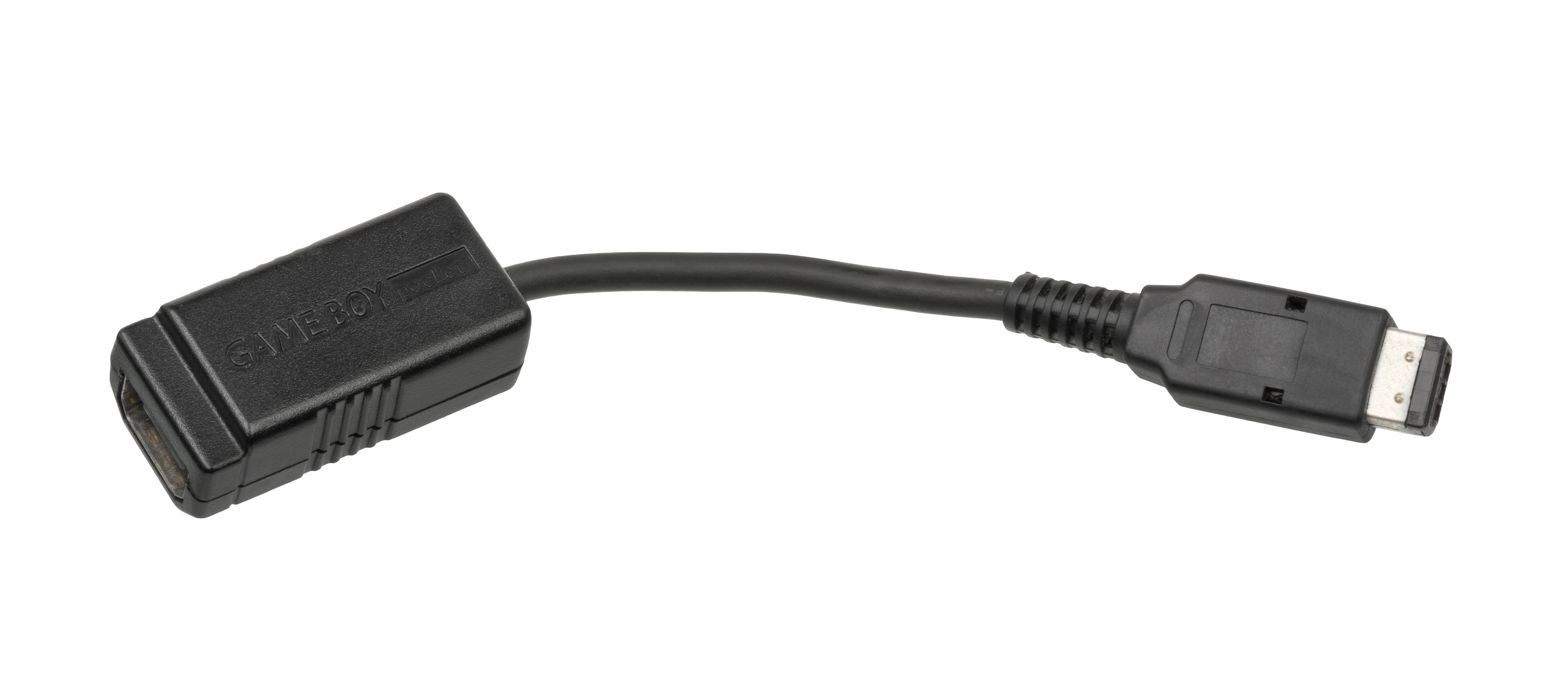
Game Link Cable Adaptor (model MGB-004) allowing a first-gen cable (model DMG-04) to be plugged into a second-gen socket

Nintendo released several small adapters to interface with the original Game Boy's "large" socket and its cables with "large" plugs. The Game Link Cable Adaptor (model MGB-004) allowed a first-gen cable (DMG-04) to be plugged into a second-gen socket. The Universal Game Link Adapter (model DMG-14) allowed a second-gen cable (MGB-008 or CGB-003) to be plugged into a first-gen socket, and features a thin plastic harness allowing it to be clipped on to a cable. In the US and Europe, Nintendo released the CGB-003 and DMG-14 in a bundle called the Universal Game Link Cable Set.

== Third generation ==
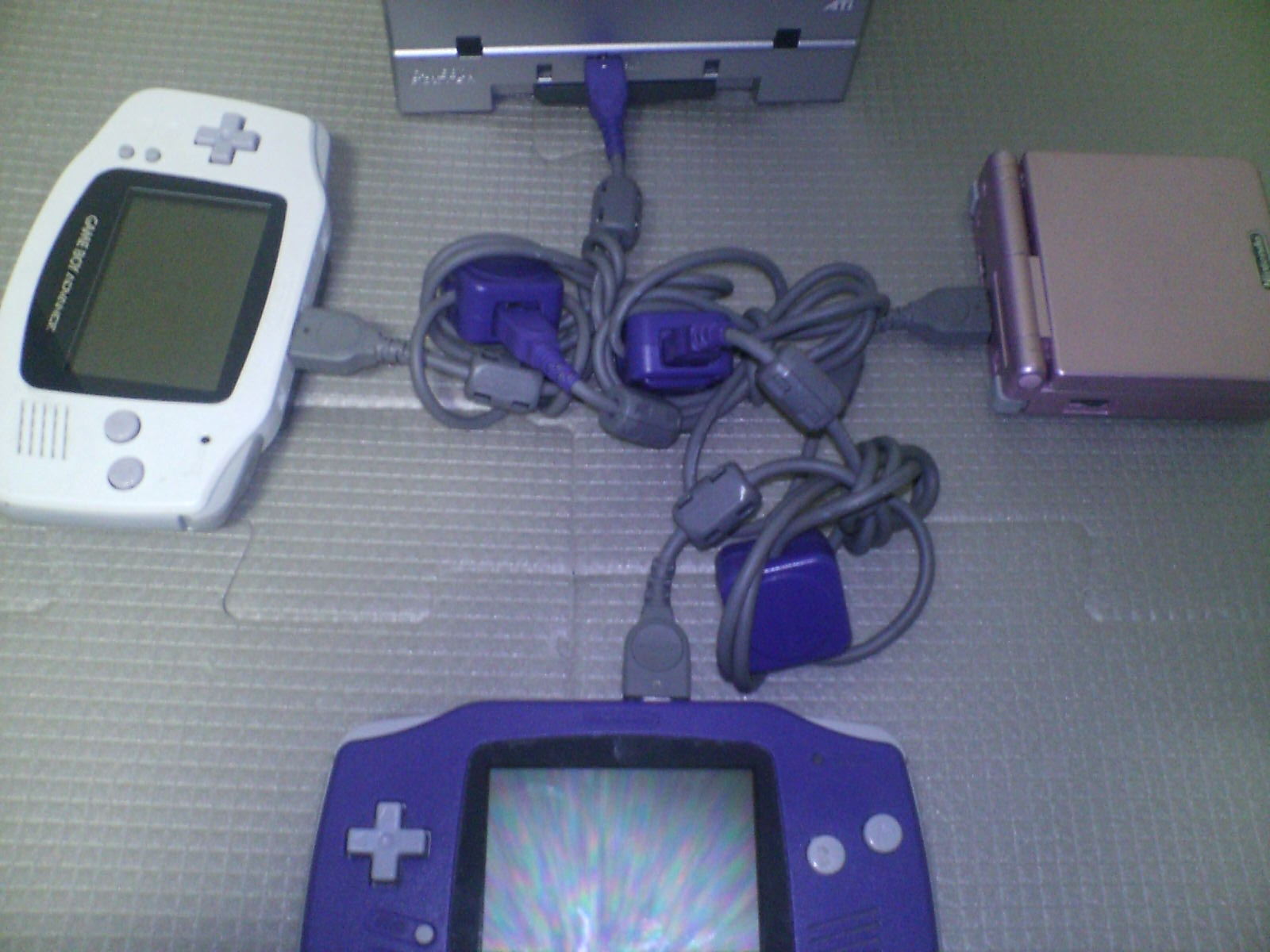
Game Boy Advance Game Link Cables connecting two Game Boy Advances (left and bottom), one Game Boy Advance SP (right) and one GameCube with a Game Boy Player attachment (top)

The third generation of Game Link Cables began with the launch of the Game Boy Advance and its Game Boy Advance Game Link Cable (model AGB-005). This cable introduced a new link port, used exclusively by the Game Boy Advance, Game Boy Advance SP and Game Boy Player.

A built-in hub in the middle of the AGB-005 allows additional cables to branch off supporting up to four-player multiplayer. Player 1 connects through the purple end, while others use the gray ends, following the cable’s plug design. To add a third player, the purple end of a second cable connects to the first cable’s hub. Similarly, to add a fourth player, the purple end of a third cable connects to the second cable’s hub.

The third-generation cable closely resembles its predecessor but includes an extra protrusion on the plug and a corresponding notch on the socket, preventing the cable from being used with older Game Boy models. A second-generation cable can be plugged into a Game Boy Advance, Game Boy Advance SP, or Game Boy Player, but only when using Game Boy and Game Boy Color games.

The e-Reader peripheral features a unique design that connects to both the cartridge slot and the third-generation link cable port simultaneously

The Game Boy Advance Wireless Adapter (model AGB-015) also launched during this generation for use with the Game Boy Advance, Game Boy Advance SP, and Game Boy Player. It connects to the link socket on the console and supports wireless multiplayer for up to five players and, in select games like Pokémon FireRed and LeafGreen, can connect up to 39 players in a virtual lobby. Unlike the AGB-005 cable, the wireless adapter only works with select Game Boy Advance titles that specifically support it.

== Fourth generation ==
The fourth and final generation was designed specifically for the Game Boy Micro, which features an even smaller link port than the Game Boy Advance. As a result, it requires its own dedicated link cable.

The Game Boy Micro Game Link Cable (model OXY-008) has fourth-generation connectors on both ends, enabling connections between two Game Boy Micro systems. Like the Game Boy Advance Game Link Cable, it includes a hub in the middle, allowing additional cables to be branched off for up to four-player multiplayer.

Nintendo released the Game Boy Micro Converter Connector (model OXY-009), a small adapter allowing a fourth-generation OXY-008 cable to interface with the larger third-generation port on the a Game Boy Advance or Game Boy Advance SP

A Game Boy Micro version of the Wireless Adapter (model OXY-004) was also released. It supports the same games as the AGB-015 and can wirelessly connect to either adapter model.

== Other link cables ==
A Game Link Cable was planned for the Virtual Boy (model VUE-004), though it never came to market.

The GameCube – Game Boy Advance link cable (model DOL-011) is a link cable that links the GameCube to the Game Boy Advance, the Game Boy Advance SP, the e-Reader, or even a second GameCube via the Game Boy Player. The Game Boy Micro is not compatible due to its different connector. The Wii, however, is compatible with the cable due to the Wii's backwards compatibility with GameCube games and controllers.
