= Hot Wheels Unleashed =

2021 video game

- Developer: Milestone
- Publisher: Milestone
- Designer: Federico Cardini
- Series: Hot Wheels
- Engine: Unreal Engine 4
- Platforms: Nintendo Switch; PlayStation 4; PlayStation 5; Windows; Xbox One; Xbox Series X/S; Stadia
- Release: NS, PS4, PS5, Windows, Xbox One, Xbox Series X/S; September 30, 2021; Amazon Luna; July 21, 2022; Stadia; September 29, 2022
- Genre: Racing
- Modes: Single-player, multiplayer

Hot Wheels Unleashed is a 2021 racing game developed and published by Milestone based on Mattel's Hot Wheels toyline. The game was released on September 30, 2021, for the Nintendo Switch, PlayStation 4, PlayStation 5, Windows, Xbox One, and Xbox Series X/S. Versions for Amazon Luna and Stadia were made available in July and September 2022, respectively. A sequel, Hot Wheels Unleashed 2: Turbocharged, was released in October 2023.

== Gameplay ==
In the game, players race against each other using Hot Wheels vehicles in miniature tracks set in various everyday locations.

Hot Wheels Unleashed is a racing game played from a third-person perspective. In the game, the player assumes control of vehicles from the Hot Wheels franchise, and races against other opponents in miniature tracks set in various everyday locations and environments, such as a garage, kitchen, and bedroom. The vehicles featured in the game can be extensively customized. Sixty-six different cars were available at launch. The game also features a career mode, a time trial, and a track editor. The game supports up to 12 players in an online session, though players can also compete with another player in a local split-screen multiplayer mode. Players had the opportunity to submit their car designs in the “Hot Wheels Unleashed Design Battle” and the winning design was used to create a Hot Wheels toy available for purchase in December 2022.

== Development ==
The game was developed by Italian developer Milestone, the company behind the MotoGP games and the Ride series, and marks the first console game based around the property since 2013. Milestone pitched the idea to Mattel in 2018 although they did not expect them to take up the offer. Milestone desired to create such a game after realizing that although they specialized in sim racers that was a "niche of the niche" and the racing genre itself was quite crowded, with lead game designer Federico Cardini telling Polygon "could we make a game to the level of, I don't know, Gran Turismo? Technically speaking, yes. Should we go head to head with Gran Turismo? That does not sound like a great idea". The game uses a physics system similar from Milestone's other games, heavily modified so that the cars would be able to perform stunts the series is known for. The team wanted to base the gameplay on physics because they felt that many other Arcade racers felt "scripted" with the cars not reacting to the player's action.

According to Cardini, the development team desired to accurately replicate Hot Wheels vehicles to a "1:1 ratio" in the game. Using this method, the team added in many subtle details to the cars and maps. Cardini described the in-game garage as the "inspiration to the entire game", noting its many characteristics.

== Marketing and release ==
The game was officially announced in February 2021. The game was released on September 30 the same year for Nintendo Switch, PlayStation 4, PlayStation 5, Windows, Xbox One, and Xbox Series X and Series S. Milestone also had plans to support the game extensively with downloadable content upon launch. A version for Amazon Luna was made available on July 21, 2022. A Game of the Year edition containing all of the downloadable content was released for all available platforms alongside Stadia on September 29 the same year. A special edition was released on September 30, 2021. This special edition included the digital Street Beasts pack, a special livery for the well known Bone Shaker car, and a steel case for the game.

== Reception ==
Reception

Aggregate score
Aggregator	Score
Metacritic	(NS) 73/100 (PC) 78/100 (PS4) 74/100 (PS5) 75/100 (XSXS) 72/100

Review scores
Publication	Score
Destructoid	8/10
Game Informer	8/10
GameSpot	7/10
IGN	9/10
Jeuxvideo.com	14/20
Nintendo Life	7/10
Push Square	7/10
Shacknews	7/10

According to review aggregator Metacritic, the PlayStation 5 and Windows versions received "generally favorable" reviews, while the Nintendo Switch, PlayStation 4, and Xbox Series X/S versions received "mixed or average" reviews.

=== Awards and accolades ===
Hot Wheels Unleashed was nominated for Best Sports/Racing Game at The Game Awards 2021, as well as Racing Game of the Year at the 25th Annual D.I.C.E. Awards.

=== Sales ===
Hot Wheels Unleashed was the fourth best selling title in United Kingdom behind FIFA 22, Mario Kart 8 Deluxe and Sonic Colors: Ultimate. As of December 2021, the game has sold 1 million copies, becoming the fastest-selling title ever for the publisher. As of April 2023, the game has sold over 2 million copies and has amassed 8 million players across all platforms.

== Sequel ==
A sequel, Hot Wheels Unleashed 2: Turbocharged, was released for Microsoft Windows, Nintendo Switch, PlayStation 4, PlayStation 5, Xbox One and Xbox Series X and Series S on October 19, 2023.
