= Hot Wheels Unleashed 2: Turbocharged =

2023 video game

- Developer: Milestone
- Publisher: Milestone
- Producer: Domenico Celenza
- Series: Hot Wheels
- Engine: Unreal Engine 4
- Platforms: Nintendo Switch; PlayStation 4; PlayStation 5; Windows; Xbox One; Xbox Series X/S
- Release: October 19, 2023
- Genre: Racing
- Modes: Single-player, multiplayer

Hot Wheels Unleashed 2: Turbocharged is a racing video game developed and published by Milestone. A sequel to Hot Wheels Unleashed (2021), the game was released in October 2023 for Nintendo Switch, PlayStation 4, PlayStation 5, Windows, Xbox One, and Xbox Series X and Series S.

The game received generally favorable reviews upon release.

== Gameplay ==
Like its predecessor, Turbocharged is a racing game. In the game, the player assumes control of vehicles from the Hot Wheels franchise, and races against opponents in miniature tracks set in various everyday locations. Turbocharged's tracks are set in five different environments based in an arcade, a family backyard, a mini-golf course, a museum, and a gas station diner. Players can also access the "Track Room", which allows them to freely create their own racing tracks and share them online. Outdoor tracks introduce new terrain types such as grass and dirt, and some tracks introduce modules, which allows players to perform impossible feats such as defying gravity and racing on ceiling. Vehicles in the game can now double jump, allowing players to jump over other opponents or to reach secret areas, and "lateral drift", which enables players to bump their opponents off the track.

Turbocharged introduces two new vehicle types: motorcycles and all-terrain vehicles. At launch, the game will feature 130 distinct vehicles. Vehicles are also categorized into six different categories: Rocket, Balanced, Swift, Drifter, Off-Road, and Heavy Duty. Each category has their own advantages and disadvantages. Unlike the first game, players unlock vehicles by purchasing them directly in the game's store, which resembles an aisle in a toy store. The roster of cars available for purchase at a given moment is randomized every few hours. The appearance of each vehicle can be extensively customized using the game's livery editor. As players progress in the game, they will earn skill points, allowing them to upgrade their vehicles to improve their performance in a race. In addition to the original's standard race and time trials, Turbocharged adds more gameplay modes such as elimination events, drift challenges, and various online events. The game also features a story mode with animated cutscenes, cross-platform play (with the exception of the Switch), and two-player split-screen multiplayer.

== Reception ==
The game received "generally favorable reviews" upon release, according to review aggregator website Metacritic. The game was nominated for "Best Sports/Racing Game" at The Game Awards 2023, as well as "Racing Game of the Year" at the 27th Annual D.I.C.E. Awards.

Luke Reilly from IGN described the game as "an impeccably detailed and blisteringly fast racer with incredible graphics and rock-solid arcade underpinnings", and "one of the strongest and most imaginative arcade racers available today", though he was disappointed by the roster of cars available for players to choose from and the exclusion of previous track locations. Writing for GameSpot, James Carr praised the small improvements the game had introduced to the franchise, but felt that the changes were not substantial enough. He was disappointed by the game's shop and its progression system for removing "the thrill of unlocking a new vehicle".
