= The Monkees discography =

Cataloging of published recordings by The Monkees

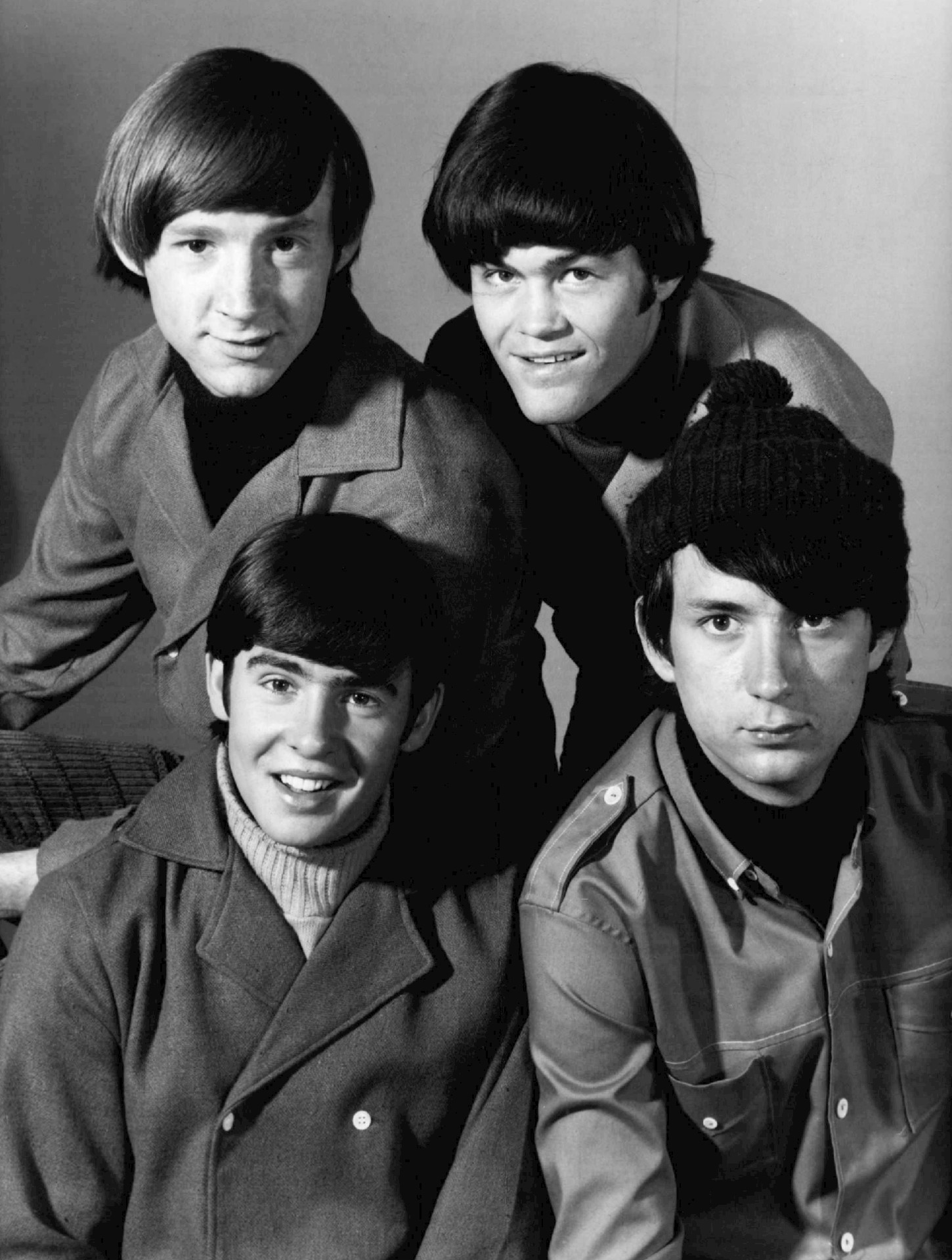
- The Monkees in 1966; Clockwise (from top-left): Peter Tork, Micky Dolenz, Michael Nesmith, Davy Jones
- Studio albums: 14
- Live albums: 11
- Compilation albums: 43
- Singles: 26

The Monkees' discography spans over 50 years, from the release of their first single, "Last Train to Clarksville", in August 1966 to their final live album, The Mike and Micky Show, in April 2020. Their discography is complicated due to the large volume of unique releases in many international markets, the release of many recordings not credited to the Monkees for lack of rights to the trademark, and the existence of many bootleg, promotional, and novelty recordings that are beyond the scope of this article.

The Monkees' record releases were originally conceived as tie-ins with their eponymous television series about a fictitious band struggling to make ends meet as rock musicians. Columbia Pictures (the parent company of the series' production company Screen Gems) created Colgems Records in 1966 with a focus on releasing records by the Monkees along with other music connected with the film and television productions of Columbia‒Screen Gems. RCA Victor handled manufacturing and distribution of Colgems records, and released the Monkees' recordings on the RCA label outside the United States. From 1966 to 1971 the Monkees released 12 singles, nine studio albums (including the soundtrack to their film Head), and three compilation albums in the United States..

After the band's initial breakup and the dissolution of Colgems Records in 1971, control of the Monkees' catalogue moved to Bell Records, who issued the single "Do It in the Name of Love" (credited to "Mickey Dolenz & Davy Jones"), a compilation album, and reissues of Colgems-era songs as singles on their Flashback Records imprint.

In 1975 and 1976, band members Dolenz and Jones reunited with longtime Monkees songwriters Tommy Boyce and Bobby Hart to record new music and perform live as Dolenz, Jones, Boyce & Hart. Capitol Records signed the quartet and released one studio album and two singles in the United States, plus a third single and a live album in Japan. Dolenz and Jones also reunited with fellow Monkee Peter Tork for the 1976 Christmas single "Christmas Is My Time of Year", released on a vanity press by producer Chip Douglas.

In 1974, the Monkees' catalogue was transferred to Arista Records, who continued Monkees reissues on the Flashback imprint. In 1986 Dolenz and Tork recorded three new songs for Arista as "Micky Dolenz and Peter Tork (of the Monkees)". On the Arista label (in the U.S.) the Monkees released three charting singles, three compilation albums, three compilation EPs, and reissues of some of the band's albums, including for the first time on compact disc. Arista Records in Australia and New Zealand released the double-LP compilation Monkeemania in 1979, which included three previously unreleased recordings, marking the beginning of a flood of previously unreleased Monkees material to be released over the next few decades.

From 1982 to 1991, Rhino Entertainment licensed and issued Monkees recordings on their own label, including the Monkees' first live album, reissues of all nine of the Monkees' Colgems studio albums, the reunion album Pool It! and its two associated singles, and the first two volumes of Missing Links, compilations devoted entirely to previously unreleased music from the Colgems era.

In the 1990s Bob Rafelson and Bert Schneider successfully sued Columbia Pictures over the destruction of the original film negatives for Easy Rider, with the court awarding them the trademarks and other intellectual property related to the Monkees, which they sold to Rhino Entertainment in January 1994. Rhino continues to release Monkees recordings as a subsidiary of Warner Music Group. Since 1994 Rhino has released in the United States three Monkees studio albums with five associated digital singles and two associated EPs, two box sets, 21 compilation albums, two digital compilation EPs, and several album reissues. Mail-order imprint Rhino Handmade released multi-disc expanded editions of seven of the Monkees' studio albums and of their 1967 live recordings.

For the purposes of this article, all major mass-market recordings released in the United States and credited to The Monkees are included, along with some of the more notable international and niche-market releases. Also included are recordings credited to at least two of the Monkees as the main artists when use of the Monkees trademark was unavailable. Recordings listed are from the United States and credited to The Monkees, unless indicated otherwise.

== Albums ==
=== Studio albums ===
This table includes the Monkees' nine original Colgems studio albums, including the soundtrack to the film Head, the Dolenz, Jones, Boyce & Hart album released on Capitol, and the four reunion albums released on Rhino. Compilations of previously unreleased archival recordings, such as the Missing Links series, live albums, compilations that include new songs, and minor international variations of these albums are not included.

Year	Title	Album details	Peak chart positions				Certifications	Sources
Year	Title	Album details	US	CA	NO	UK	Certifications	Sources
1966	The Monkees	Released: October 10, 1966; Label: Colgems COM/COS-101	1	1	3	1	RIAA: 5× Platinum	
1967	More of the Monkees	Released: January 9, 1967; Label: Colgems COM/COS-102	1	1	1	1	RIAA: 5× Platinum	
1967	Headquarters	Released: May 22, 1967; Label: Colgems COM/COS-103	1	1	2	2	RIAA: 2× Platinum	
1967	Pisces, Aquarius, Capricorn & Jones Ltd.	Released: November 6, 1967; Label: Colgems COM/COS-104	1	2	4	5	RIAA: 2× Platinum	
1968	The Birds, the Bees & the Monkees	Released: April 22, 1968; Label: Colgems COM/COS-109	3	6	—	—	RIAA: Platinum	
1968	Head	Released: November 1968; Label: Colgems COSO-5008	45	24	—	—		
1969	Instant Replay	Released: February 15, 1969; Label: Colgems COS-113	32	45	—	—		
1969	The Monkees Present	Released: October 1, 1969; Label: Colgems COS-117	100	—	—	—		
1970	Changes	Released: June 1970; Label: Colgems COS-119	152 ^{A}	—	—	—		
1976	Dolenz, Jones, Boyce & Hart ^{B}	Released: May 1976; Label: Capitol ST-11513	—	—	—	—		
1987	Pool It!	Released: August 1987; Label: Rhino 70706	72	—	—	—		
1996	Justus	Released: October 15, 1996 ^{C}; Label: Rhino 72542	—	—	—	—		
2016	Good Times!	Released: May 27, 2016; Label: Rhino 553592	14	95	—	29		
2018	Christmas Party	Released: October 2018; Label: Rhino	—	—	—	—		
"—" denotes releases that did not chart.

A: Changes initially failed to chart upon release in 1970, but made the Billboard 200 when reissued in 1986.
B: Released as Dolenz, Jones, Boyce & Hart.
C: Justus was released initially only on cassette and CD, but not on vinyl. It was issued on limited edition vinyl on October 30, 2012.

=== Live albums ===
This table includes official releases of live albums. These are derived from the Monkees' 1967 summer tour, the 1976 Dolenz, Jones, Boyce & Hart tour, the 1986 "20th Anniversary" tour, the 1995 "Together Again" tour, the 2001 summer tour, the 2002 "MonkeeMania" tour, and the 2015 "Mike & Micky Show" tour. Not included are bootleg recordings or compilations that include live tracks.

Live recordings made on 21 January 1967 at Memorial Coliseum, Phoenix, Arizona for The Monkees episode "The Monkees on Tour" appear on the Rhino Handmade "super deluxe" More of the Monkees box set.

Live recordings made on 17 May 1968 at Valley Music Hall, North Salt Lake, Utah for the film Head appear on the Rhino Handmade "super deluxe" Head box set.

Year	Title	Album details	Peak chart positions	Sources
Year	Title	Album details	US	Sources
1981	Concert in Japan ^{D}	Released: April 1981; Label: Capitol Records (Japan) ECS-91018; Recorded: 20 July 1976 at Yubin Chokin Hall, Tokyo, Japan	—	
1987	Live 1967	Released: June 1987; Label: Rhino 70139; Recorded: 25 August 1967 at Seattle Center Coliseum, Seattle, Washington, 26 August 1967 at Memorial Coliseum, Portland, Oregon & 17 August 1967 at Spokane Coliseum, Spokane, Washington	—	
1987	20th Anniversary Tour 1986 ^{E}	Released: July 1987; Label: Rhino FSH-71110 (two LPs); Recorded: 1 December 1986 at Charleston Civic Center, Charleston, West Virginia & 3 December 1986 at Stabler Arena, Bethlehem, Pennsylvania; Released as Live! on CD in 1994	—	
1995	Together Again ^{F}	Released: 1995; Label: Hercules Productions; Recorded: 6 August 1994 at Three Rivers Regatta, Pittsburgh, Pennsylvania	—	
2001	2001: Live in Las Vegas! ^{G}	Released: 2001; Label: Hercules Productions 7728 01; Recorded: March 2001 at MGM Grand, Las Vegas, Nevada	—	
2001	Summer 1967: The Complete U.S. Concert Recordings	Released: May 18, 2001; Label: Rhino Handmade 7755 (four CDs); Recorded: 12 August 1967, Mobile Municipal Auditorium, Mobile, Alabama, 25 August 1967 at Seattle Center Coliseum, Seattle, Washington, 26 August 1967 at Memorial Coliseum, Portland, Oregon & 17 August 1967 at Spokane Coliseum, Spokane, Washington	—	
2002	MonkeeMania: 2002 Live in Toronto ^{H}	Released: 2002; Label: Hercules Productions 8056 01; Recorded: January 2002 at Casino Rama, Rama, Ontario	—	
2003	Live Summer Tour	Released: 2003; Label: WIN Media/King Biscuit; Recorded: 31 August 2001 at the Sun Theatre, Anaheim, California	—	
2003	Extended Versions	Released: November 28, 2003; Label: BMG Special Markets; Recorded: 2001	—	
2020	The Mike and Micky Show	Released: April 3, 2020; Label: Rhino; Recorded: March 2019 & June 2019	178	
2022	The Monkees Live! Summer Tour	Released: August 2022; Label: Grey Scale (UK) GSGZ268CD-DVD; Format: CD × 2 + DVD; Recorded: 31 August 2001 at the Sun Theatre, Anaheim, California	—	
"—" denotes releases that did not chart.

D: Released as Dolenz, Jones, Boyce & Hart.
E: Released as Davy Jones, Micky Dolenz, Peter Tork.
F: Released as Micky & Davy.
G: Released as Micky Dolenz, Davy Jones, Peter Tork.
H: Released as Micky Dolenz & Davy Jones.

=== Compilation albums ===
A large number of compilation albums for the Monkees have been released internationally. This list primarily focuses on United States releases, and it does not include live albums, compilation EPs with six or fewer tracks, box sets where the individual parts are primarily albums or singles that were previously released, expanded editions of the band's studio albums, or collections of songs by various artists that include Monkees songs.

The North American releases in this list include the two mass-market compilations released by Colgems Records between 1969 and 1971; the 1972 Bell compilation Re-Focus; the 1985 Pair double-LP Hit Factory; the three mass-market compilations released by Arista Records between 1976 and 1986; two compilations of album cuts and rarities licensed by Rhino Records between 1982 and 1984; ten mass-market single-disc hits compilations released in the U.S. by Rhino Records between 1995 and 2018; the three Missing Links compilations of previously unreleased material from Rhino Records between 1987 and 1996; Kid Rhino's 1996 children's compilation; the three compilations released on Rhino's Flashback imprint between 1997 and 2007; five mass-market multi-disc compilations released in the U.S. by Rhino Records between 1991 and 2026; seven compilations offered primarily through mail order or other promotions; a 2025 digital-only compilation album; and four compilations of session recordings and outtakes from the Headquarters and Head albums.

Also included are 14 international compilations notable for their chart performance or for containing rare tracks.

Year	Title	Album details	Peak chart positions					Certifications	Sources
Year	Title	Album details	US	AUS	JP CB	JP OR	UK	Certifications	Sources
1967	The Monkees' Golden Album	Released: December 1967; Label: Victor (Japan) SRA-5103	—	—	1	—	—		
1968	The Monkees' Golden Story	Released: October 1968; Label: Victor (Japan) SRA-9072; Format: LP × 2	—	—	1	—	—		
1969	The Monkees Greatest Hits	Released: June 1969; Label: Colgems COS-115	89	—	—	—	—		
1970	The Monkees' Golden Hits	Released: January 1970; Label: Colgems PRS-329; Mail order only	—	—	—	—	—		
1971	Barrel Full of Monkees	Released: January 1971; Label: Colgems SCOS-1001; Format: LP × 2	207	—	—	—	—		
1972	Re-Focus	Released: November 1972; Label: Bell 6081	—	—	37	—	—		
1976	The Monkees	Released: June 1976; Label: Laurie House 8009/RCA Special Products 2–0188; Format: LP × 2; Mail order only	—	—	—	—	—		
1976	The Monkees Greatest Hits	Released: July 1976; Label: Arista 4089 (later 8313); Same track list as Re-Focus.	58	55	—	—	—	RIAA: Platinum	
1979	Monkeemania (40 Timeless Hits)	Released: 1979; Label: Arista MONK-1 1/2 (Australia); Format: LP × 2; Includes 3 previously unreleased recordings	—	37	—	—	—		
1980	The Best	Released: June 1980; Label: Arista 20RS-12 (Japan)	—	—	—	16	—		
1981	The Monkees	Released: 1981; Label: Arista DARTY 12 (UK)	—	—	—	—	99		
1982	More Greatest Hits of The Monkees	Released: October 1982; Label: Arista 2007 (later 8334); Format: LP × 2	—	—	—	—	—		
1982	Monkee Business	Released: November 1982; Label: Rhino 701; Picture disc	—	—	—	—	—		
1984	Monkee Flips	Released: February 1984; Label: Rhino 113	—	—	—	—	—		
1985	Hey-Hey — It's the Monkees: 20 Smash Hits	Released: 1985; Label: Platinum Music CD 005 (Germany); First Monkees recordings issued on compact disc	—	—	—	—	—		
1985	Hit Factory	Released: December 1985; Label: Pair 1109; Format: LP × 2	—	—	—	—	—		
1986	The Best of the Monkees	Released: June 1986; Label: Silver Eagle/Arista 1048 (Canada); Format: LP × 2; Mail order only	—	—	—	—	—		
1986	Then & Now... The Best of the Monkees	Released: July 1986; Label: Arista 8432; Includes 3 new recordings	21	35	—	—	—	RIAA: Platinum	
1987	Missing Links	Released: June 1987; Label: Rhino 70150; Previously unreleased recordings	—	—	—	—	—		
1989	By Request	Released: September 1989; Label: Arista B18D-51001~03 (Japan); Format: CD × 3	—	—	—	—	—		
1989	Hey! Hey! It's the Monkees: Greatest Hits	Released: 1989; Label: K-tel NE 1432 (UK)	—	—	—	—	12		
1990	Missing Links Volume Two	Released: January 1990; Label: Rhino 70903; Previously unreleased recordings	—	—	—	—	—		
1991	Listen to the Band	Released: October 1991; Label: Rhino 70566; Format: CD × 4, cassette × 4	—	—	—	—	—		
1992	The ★ Collection: 25th Anniversary Edition	Released: 1992; Label: Arista 262507 (Europe)	—	25	—	—	—		
1993	Rare Tracks	Released: October 1993; Label: Century CECC 00601 (Japan); Tracks from Missing Links vols. 1 and 2 and Live 1967	—	—	—	—	—		
1995	Greatest Hits ^{I}	Released: October 1995; Label: Rhino 72190	21	—	—	—	—	RIAA: Gold	
1996	The Monkees	Released: 1996; Label: Rhino 71836; Guitar-shaped package; Official release of a 1994 promo disc	—	—	—	—	—		
1996	Barrelful of Monkees: Monkees Songs for Kids!	Released: March 1996; Label: Kid Rhino 72407	—	—	—	—	—		
1996	Missing Links Volume Three	Released: March 1996; Label: Rhino 72153; Previously unreleased recordings	—	—	—	—	—		
1996	30th Anniversary Collection	Released: Summer 1996; Label: Rhino 7189; Format: CD × 2 + VHS Up Close and Personal; Mail order only	—	—	—	—	—		
1996	Tutti Legends: The Monkees	Released: September 1996; Label: Rhino 7193; Includes magazine	—	—	—	—	—		
1997	I'm a Believer and Other Hits	Released: July 1997; Label: Flashback/Rhino 72883; Includes a previously unreleased recording	—	—	—	—	—		
1997	The Greatest Hits of the Monkees	Released: March 1997; Label: Telstar 9548-35218-2 (UK)	—	—	—	—	15		
1998	Daydream Believer and Other Hits	Released: March 1998; Label: Flashback/Rhino 75242; Includes a previously unreleased recording	—	—	—	—	—		
1998	The Monkees Anthology	Released: April 1998; Label: Rhino 75269; Format: CD × 2	—	—	—	—	—		
2000	Headquarters Sessions	Released: September 2000; Label: Rhino Handmade 7715; Format: CD × 3; Mostly previously unreleased recordings; Mail order only	—	—	—	—	—		
2001	Music Box	Released: February 2001; Label: Rhino 76706; Format: CD × 4	—	—	—	—	—		
2001	The Definitive Monkees	Released: April 2001; Label: WEA 8573-86691-2 (Europe); Bonus disc (Europe only)	—	52	—	—	15		
2002	Mini and the Monkees	Released: March 2002; Label: Warner Special Products OPCD-1100; Used to promote launch of Mini in the United States. Disc was included with early car purchases.	—	—	—	—	—		
2002	The Essentials	Released: June 2002; Label: Rhino 76057	—	—	—	—	—		
2003	The Best of The Monkees	Released: April 2003; Label: Rhino 73875; Format: CD + CD-G (karaoke disc)	20	—	—	—	—	RIAA: Gold	
2005	All-Time Favorites! 36 Greatest Hits	Released: 2005; Label: Timeless Music 17757 / Warner Special Products 3586A; Format: CD × 3; Sold at Costco and Sam's Club, and by mail order	—	—	—	—	—		
2006	The Very Best of the Monkees	Released: 2006; Label: WMTV 028 (UK)	—	—	—	—	84		
2007	Last Train to Clarksville and Other Hits	Released: September 2007; Label: Flashback/Rhino 176444	—	—	—	—	—		
2007	I'm a Believer: The Best of the Monkees	Released: 2007; Label: Music Club Deluxe MCDLX074 (UK); Format: CD × 2	—	—	—	—	84	BPI: Silver	
2008	Here We Come... The Ultimate Anthology	Released: 2008; Label: Reader's Digest OPCD-8314; Format: CD × 3; Mail order only	—	—	—	—	—		
2011	Flashback with the Monkees	Released: 2011; Label: Rhino 528089	125	—	—	—	—		
2011	Monkeemania (The Very Best of the Monkees)	Released: May 2011; Label: Rhino 8122797688 (UK); Format: CD × 2	—	—	—	—	70		
2012	Selections from the Headquarters Sessions	Released: December 2012; Label: Rhino 533002; Format: LP; Limited release of 2500 copies	—	—	—	—	—		
2016	The Monkees 50	Released: August 2016; Label: Rhino 554390; Format: CD × 3	—	—	—	—	—		
2016	Forever	Released: August 2016; Label: Rhino 554391	—	—	—	—	—		
2017	Head‒Alternate	Released: March 2017; Label: Friday Music 5008; Previously released alternate versions of songs from Head	—	—	—	—	—		
2017	Summer of Love	Released: July 2017; Label: Rhino 560059	—	—	—	—	—		
2017	Headquarters / Stack O' Tracks	Released: November 2017; Label: Friday Music 10367; Instrumental versions of songs from Headquarters	—	—	—	—	—		
2018	An Introduction to the Monkees Vol. 1	Released: June 2018; Label: Rhino 570981	—	—	—	—	—		
2018	An Introduction to the Monkees Vol. 2	Released: October 2018; Label: Rhino 570982	—	—	—	—	—		
2025	Digital Dozen	Released: June 2025; Label: Rhino, digital only	—	—	—	—	—		
2026	The A's, the B's, and the Monkees	Released: January 2026; Label: Rhino 728467; Format: LP × 2, CD × 2	—	—	—	—	—	Disc one contains all the Monkees' Colgems A-sides chronologically, and disc two contains their respective B-sides.	
2026	Made for TV	Released: 14 August 2026; Label: Rhino R2 728947; Format: LP + CD × 2 + Blu-ray	—	—	—	—	—	LP contains unique mono mixes from season 1 of The Monkees; CDs contain all songs from season 1 of The Monkees chronologically in mono mixes as aired; Blu-ray contains 10 "fan favorite" episodes from season 1.	
"—" denotes releases that did not chart.

I: Greatest Hits did not appear on the Billboard 200 chart, but reached number 21 on Billboard's Top Pop Catalog Albums chart on 22 July 2000. Prior to December 2009 albums over 18 months old were ineligible to appear on the Billboard 200 chart.

=== Box sets ===
This list does not include expanded editions of the Monkees' albums or multi-part compilations where the individual parts were not previously released separately.

Year	Title	Details	Contents	Sources
1967	The Monkees / More of the Monkees	Released: April 1967; Label: Colgems 58CG-5001 / CG3P-5001; Format: 8-track / Reel-to-reel; The track sequences on the 8-track differ from the original albums.	The Monkees; More of the Monkees	
1967	Pisces, Aquarius, Capricorn & Jones Ltd. / Headquarters	Released: c. December 1967; Label: Colgems 58CG-5002 / CG3P-5002; Format: 8-track / Reel-to-reel; The track sequences on the 8-track differ from the original albums.	Pisces, Aquarius, Capricorn & Jones Ltd.; Headquarters	
1994	"18" Great Singles All on Colored Vinyl	Released: 1994; Label: Collectables; Format: 7" vinyl × 18	all 12 Colgems singles; "Valleri" (original version) / "All the King's Horses"; "I'll Be Back Up on My Feet" (original version) / "I Wanna Be Free"; "Mary, Mary" / "Your Auntie Grizelda"; "Heart and Soul" / "MGBGT" (live); "Every Step of the Way" / "(I'll) Love You Forever" (live); "Don't Do It" (Micky Dolenz solo) / "Huff Puff" (Micky Dolenz solo)	
2007	The Monkees: Collector's Edition	Released: September 2007; Label: Madacy Entertainment (Canada) TC2 53210; Format: CD × 3	I'm a Believer and Other Hits; Daydream Believer and Other Hits; Last Train to Clarksville and Other Hits	
2009	Original Album Series	Released: 2009; Label: Rhino R2 531957; Format: CD × 5 (stereo albums)	The Monkees; More of the Monkees; Headquarters; Pisces, Aquarius, Capricorn & Jones Ltd.; The Birds, the Bees & the Monkees	
2014	The Monkees in Mono	Released: October 2014; Label: Friday Music FRM-1966; Format: LP × 5 (mono)	same as Original Album Series but in mono	
2016	Classic Album Collection	Released: January 2016; Label: Rhino 081227949860; Formats: CD × 10, LP × 10	all 9 Colgems studio albums; bonus disc containing mostly non-album singles and mixes	
2022	Dolenz, Jones, Boyce & Hart	Released: July 2022; Label: 7a Records 7A035 (UK); Formats: CD × 2, LP × 2	Dolenz, Jones, Boyce & Hart (studio album); Live in Japan	

== EPs ==
Colgems Records did not release extended-play records for the mass market, but this list includes the two "little LP" versions of the Monkees' first two albums for use in jukeboxes. Internationally, RCA issued many EPs. This list includes those released in Japan, Australia, New Zealand, and Mexico during the Colgems era, where they were most popular. This list also includes EPs released in the UK in the 1980s, some of which charted; American 3-inch CDs released by Arista Records; Rhino Hi-Five EPs released only for download or streaming; and EPs issued by Rhino Records expanding on their final two albums.

EPs are listed by their title in italics. Untitled EPs are listed by their leading track without italics.

Year	Title	Details	Peak chart positions			Sources
Year	Title	Details	UK	AUS	MX	Sources
1966	Last Train to Clarksville 恋の終列車	RCA Japan, 7" vinyl 33 r.p.m.; Last Train to Clarksville / Let's Dance On / Tomorrow's Gonna Be Another Day / Saturday's Child	—	—	—	
1966	(theme from) The Monkees モンキーズのテーマ	RCA Japan, 7" vinyl 33 r.p.m.; (theme from) The Monkees / Sweet Young Thing / I Wanna Be Free / Gonna Buy Me a Dog	—	—	—	
1966	I'm a Believer; Soy un creyente	RCA Mexico, 7" vinyl; I'm a Believer / (I'm Not Your) Steppin' Stone / Take a Giant Step / Last Train to Clarksville	—	—	—	
1967	The Monkees	Colgems (US), 7" vinyl 33 r.p.m.; "Little LP" for jukeboxes only	—	—	—	
1967	More of the Monkees	Colgems (US), 7" vinyl 33 r.p.m.; "Little LP" for jukeboxes only	—	—	—	
1967	The Monkees—Volume 1 ^{J}	RCA Australia & New Zealand, 7" vinyl; (theme from) The Monkees / Saturday's Child / Tomorrow's Gonna Be Another Day / Take a Giant Step	—	1	—	
1967	(theme from) The Monkees; Tema de los Monkees	RCA Mexico, 7" vinyl; (theme from) The Monkees / Tomorrow's Gonna Be Another Day / Let's Dance On / Sweet Young Thing	—	—	2	
1967	Saturday's Child; Sabado para niños	RCA Mexico, 7" vinyl; Saturday's Child / Papa Gene's Blues / This Just Doesn't Seem to Be My Day / I'll Be True to You	—	—	—	
1967	More of the Monkees アイム・ア・ビリーバー	RCA Japan, 7" vinyl 33 r.p.m.; I'm a Believer / Hold On Girl / Look Out (Here Comes Tomorrow) / Mary, Mary	—	—	—	
1967	More of the Monkees モンキーズ	RCA Japan, 7" vinyl 33 r.p.m.; The Kind of Girl I Could Love / Your Auntie Grizelda / She / The Day We Fall in Love	—	—	—	
1967	The Monkees—Volume 2	RCA Australia & New Zealand, 7" vinyl; I'm a Believer / Papa Gene's Blues / This Just Doesn't Seem to Be My Day / Let's Dance On	—	60	—	
1967	The Monkees—Volume 3	RCA New Zealand, 7" vinyl; I Wanna Be Free / Last Train to Clarksville / (I'm Not Your) Steppin' Stone / She	—	—	—	
1967	Look Out (Here Comes Tomorrow); Aqui esta el futuro!	RCA Mexico, 7" vinyl; Look Out (Here Comes Tomorrow) / The Kind of Girl I Could Love / Sometime in the Morning / Laugh	—	—	1	
1967	She; Ella	RCA Mexico, 7" vinyl; She / When Love Comes Knockin' (at Your Door) / Mary, Mary / Hold On Girl	—	—	2	
1967	A Little Bit Me, a Little Bit You; Un poco de mi y un poco de ti	RCA Mexico, 7" vinyl; A Little Bit Me, a Little Bit You / The Girl I Knew Somewhere / The Day We Fall in Love / Your Auntie Grizelda	—	—	—	
1967	You Told Me; Me dijiste	RCA Mexico, 7" vinyl; You Told Me / No Time / Sunny Girlfriend / Early Morning Blues and Greens	—	—	—	
1967	Forget That Girl; Olvida esa muchacha	RCA Mexico, 7" vinyl; Forget That Girl / I'll Spend My Life with You / You Just May Be the One / For Pete's Sake	—	—	—	
1967	Gonna Buy Me a Dog; Voy a comprar un perro	RCA Mexico, 7" vinyl; Gonna Buy Me a Dog / I Wanna Be Free / Pleasant Valley Sunday / Words	—	—	3	
1967	Words 恋の合言葉	RCA Japan, 7" vinyl 33 r.p.m.; Words / Pleasant Valley Sunday / A Little Bit Me, a Little Bit You / The Girl I Knew Somewhere	—	—	—	
1967	Daydream Believer / Star Collector デイドリーム／スター・コレクター	RCA Japan, 7" vinyl 33 r.p.m.; Daydream Believer / Goin' Down / Star Collector / No Time	—	—	—	
1967	She	RCA Australia, 7" vinyl; She / Sunny Girlfriend / Look Out (Here Comes Tomorrow) / Gonna Buy Me a Dog	—	5	—	
1968	Shades of Gray 灰色の影	RCA Japan, 7" vinyl 33 r.p.m.; Shades of Gray / Forget That Girl / Randy Scouse Git / You Just May Be the One	—	—	—	
1968	Love Is Only Sleeping; El amor esta durmiendo	RCA Mexico, 7" vinyl; Love Is Only Sleeping / Cuddly Toy / Hard to Believe / Star Collector	—	—	—	
1968	Daydream Believer; Soñando despierto	RCA Mexico, 7" vinyl; Daydream Believer / She Hangs Out / Goin' Down / The Door Into Summer	—	—	—	
1968	Salesman; El vendedor	RCA Mexico, 7" vinyl; Salesman / Daily Nightly / Don't Call on Me / What Am I Doing Hangin' 'Round?	—	—	—	
1968	D. W. Washburn / Valleri; D・W・ウォッシュバーン／すてきなバレリ	RCA Japan, 7" vinyl 33 r.p.m.; D. W. Washburn / It's Nice to Be with You / Valleri / Tapioca Tundra	—	—	—	
1968	Valleri	RCA Mexico, 7" vinyl; Valleri / Auntie's Municipal Court / Tapioca Tundra / P.O. Box 9847	—	—	—	
1968	Cuddly Toy	RCA Australia, 7" vinyl; Cuddly Toy / Laugh / You Told Me / No Time	—	12	—	
1968	I'll Be Back Up on My Feet; Me recuperare	RCA Mexico, 7" vinyl; I'll Be Back Up on My Feet / We Were Made for Each Other / Dream World / The Poster	—	—	—	
1968	D. W. Washburn	RCA Mexico, 7" vinyl; D. W. Washburn / Dream World / It's Nice to Be with You / Zor and Zam	—	—	—	
1969	Tear Drop City; Ciudad de lagrimas	RCA Mexico, 7" vinyl; Tear Drop City / You and I / Don't Listen to Linda / Just a Game	—	—	—	
1969	The Girl I Left Behind Me; La chica que deje	RCA Mexico, 7" vinyl; The Girl I Left Behind Me / I Won't Be the Same Without Her / Don't Wait for Me / While I Cry	—	—	—	
1969	Mommy and Daddy; Mamita y papito	RCA Mexico, 7" vinyl; Mommy and Daddy / Good Clean Fun / Listen to the Band / Little Girl	—	—	—	
1969	We Were Made for Each Other	RCA Australia, 7" vinyl; We Were Made for Each Other / The Poster / Hold On Girl / She Hangs Out	—	—	—	
1969	I Wanna Be Free	RCA Australia, 7" vinyl; I Wanna Be Free / Cuddly Toy / Daydream Believer / Valleri	—	—	—	
1970	Oh My My	RCA Mexico, 7" vinyl; Oh My My / Do You Feel It Too? / Acapulco Sun / Midnight Train	—	—	—	
1980	The Monkees EP	Arista UK, 7" vinyl; I'm a Believer / Last Train to Clarksville / Daydream Believer / A Little Bit Me, A Little Bit You	33	—	—	
1981	Monkees EP Volume Two	Arista UK, 7" vinyl; (I'm Not Your) Steppin' Stone / Pleasant Valley Sunday / Alternate Title / What Am I Doing Hangin' 'Round?	—	—	—	
1982	I'm a Believer EP	Arista UK, 7" vinyl; I'm a Believer / Last Train to Clarksville / (theme from) The Monkees / Listen to the Band	—	—	—	
1986	That Was Then... This Is Now	Arista UK, 12" vinyl 45 r.p.m.; That Was Then, This Is Now (Extended Version) / Pleasant Valley Sunday / (theme from) The Monkees / Last Train to Clarksville	—	—	—	
1988	Last Train to Clarksville	Arista, 3" CD; Last Train to Clarksville / Valleri / The Girl I Knew Somewhere	—	—	—	
1988	I'm a Believer	Arista, 3" CD; I'm a Believer / Sometime in the Morning / Words	—	—	—	
1988	Daydream Believer	Arista, 3" CD (US); Daydream Believer / For Pete's Sake / You Just May Be the One	—	—	—	
1989	Daydream Believer	BMG, 7" vinyl & CD (Europe); Daydream Believer / (theme from) The Monkees / A Little Bit Me, a Little Bit You	62	—	—	
1989	Last Train to Clarksville	BMG (Europe), 7" vinyl & 3" CD; Last Train to Clarksville / I'm a Believer / Pleasant Valley Sunday	—	—	—	
1989	Original A + B Sides	BMG (Europe), CD; Last Train to Clarksville / Take a Giant Step / I'm a Believer / (I'm Not Your) Steppin' Stone	—	—	—	
2005	Rhino Hi-Five: The Monkees	Rhino, digital-only; Pleasant Valley Sunday / Last Train to Clarksville / Words / Daydream Believer / I'm a Believer	—	—	—	
2006	Rhino Hi-Five: The Monkees Vol. 2	Rhino, digital-only; (I'm Not Your) Steppin' Stone / She / Mary, Mary / Can You Dig It? / Porpoise Song (Theme from "Head")	—	—	—	
2016	Good Times! Plus!	Rhino, 10" vinyl 33 r.p.m.; Terrifying / Me & Magdalena (Version 2) / A Better World / Love's What I Want	—	—	—	
2019	Christmas Party Plus!	Rhino, 2 × 7" vinyl; Unwrap You at Christmas / Unwrap You at Christmas (demo) / Riu Chiu / Christmas Is My Time of Year	—	—	—	
"—" denotes that the recording did not chart or was not released in that territory.

J: This EP initially charted as a whole, reaching number 3 in Australia. The leading track went on to reach number 1.

== Singles ==
The following table includes all major singles released in the United States, including the 12 issued by Colgems Records from 1966–70; the 1971 Bell single "Do It in the Name of Love"; two Dolenz, Jones, Boyce & Hart singles released on Columbia Records; the Christmas singles released in 1976 and 2018; the three charting Arista singles released in conjunction with the 1976 and 1986 compilation albums The Monkees Greatest Hits and Then & Now... The Best of The Monkees; both Rhino singles released in conjunction with the 1987 album Pool It!; the three digital singles issued in conjunction with Good Times! in 2016, and the 1983 release of the Chip Douglas-produced "Steam Engine", which featured in reruns of the TV series.

The Monkees, wanting more involvement in recording and selecting their songs, hoped to release "All of Your Toys" as their third single, but due to Colgems' policy of only releasing songs published by Screen Gems–Columbia Music, a compromise was reached to allow the Monkees to choose a B-side for "A Little Bit Me, a Little Bit You" that the company owned publishing rights to. Their music supervisor, Don Kirshner, displeased with the arrangement, rushed to release the single with his preferred B-side, "She Hangs Out", having sleeves printed and masters shipped to RCA Victor Canada featuring the song. This led to his firing, and the offending single was canceled and replaced with one featuring the Nesmith-penned tune "The Girl I Knew Somewhere". While none of the tracks from the 1967 album Headquarters were issued as singles in North America, "Randy Scouse Git" was widely released elsewhere (often under the title "Alternate Title").

RCA issued a large number of other singles internationally that were not released in the United States. This table only includes some noteworthy charting singles released in Europe, Japan, the Philippines, and Australia. A number of EPs charting as singles, non-charting reissues, withdrawn singles, cereal box records, archival recordings, and single-like novelties are not included.

Year	Titles (A-side, B-side) Both sides from same album except where indicated	Peak chart positions																	Certifications	Studio Album	Sources
Year	Titles (A-side, B-side) Both sides from same album except where indicated	US	US AC	US CB	US RW	AUS	AUT	BEL	CAN	GER	IRE	JP CB	JP OR	NED	NOR	NZ	PHI	UK	Certifications	Studio Album	Sources
1966	"Last Train to Clarksville" "Take a Giant Step"	1 —	— —	1 —	1 —	14 —	— —	— —	1 —	29 —	5 —	2 —	— —	14 —	— —	6 —	— —	23 —	RIAA: Gold	The Monkees	
1966	"I'm a Believer" "(I'm Not Your) Steppin' Stone"	1; 20	— —	1; 25	1; 42	1 —	1 —	1 —	1; 1	1 —	1 —	3 —	— —	1 —	1 —	1 —	1 —	1 —	RIAA: Gold	More of the Monkees	
1967	"A Little Bit Me, a Little Bit You" "The Girl I Knew Somewhere" (non-album track)	2; 39	— —	1 —	1; 69	4 —	4 —	10 —	1 —	7; 17	6 —	— —	— —	7 —	3 —	1 —	1 —	3 —	RIAA: Gold	—N/a	
1967	"(Theme From) The Monkees" "I Wanna Be Free"	— —	— —	— —	— —	— —	— —	— —	— —	— —	— —	1 —	4 —	— —	— —	— —	— —	— —		The Monkees	
1967	"(Theme From) The Monkees" "Mary, Mary" (from More of the Monkees)	— —	— —	— —	— —	— —	— —	— —	— —	— —	— —	— —	— —	— —	1 —	— —	— —	— —		The Monkees	
1967	"Randy Scouse Git" ('Alternate Title') "Forget That Girl"	— —	— —	— —	— —	5 —	14 —	11 —	— —	11 —	4 —	— —	— —	18 —	2 —	5 —	— —	2 —		Headquarters	
1967	"Pleasant Valley Sunday" "Words"	3; 11	— —	3; 5	2; 14	10 —	— —	— —	1; 57	18 —	11 —	— 9	— 17	— —	4 —	2 —	— —	11 —	RIAA: Gold	Pisces, Aquarius, Capricorn & Jones Ltd.	
1967	"I Wanna Be Free" "You Just May Be the One" (from Headquarters)	— —	— —	— —	— —	14 —	— —	— —	— —	— —	— —	— —	— —	— —	— —	— —	— —	— —		The Monkees	
1967	"Daydream Believer" "Goin' Down" (non-album track)	1; 104	— —	1 —	1 —	2; 16	7 —	8 —	1; 36	4 —	1 —	2 —	4 —	3 —	2 —	1 —	4 —	5 —	RIAA: Gold	The Birds, the Bees & the Monkees	
1967	"Shades of Gray" "Mr. Webster"	— —	— —	— —	— —	— —	— —	— —	— —	— —	— —	— —	— —	— —	— —	— —	7 —	— —		Headquarters	
1967	"Star Collector" "No Time" (from Headquarters)	— —	— —	— —	— —	— —	— —	— —	— —	— —	— —	— —	37 —	— —	— —	— —	— —	— —		Pisces, Aquarius, Capricorn & Jones Ltd.	
1968	"Forget That Girl" "Sunny Girlfriend"	— —	— —	— —	— —	— —	— —	— —	— —	— —	— —	— —	— —	— —	— —	— —	8 —	— —		Headquarters	
1968	"Valleri" "Tapioca Tundra"	3; 34	— —	1; 47	1; 38	4 —	20 —	11 —	1; 1	11 —	8 —	2 —	4 —	12 —	9 —	4 —	3 —	12 —	RIAA: Gold	The Birds, the Bees & the Monkees	
1968	"Hard to Believe" "Love Is Only Sleeping"	— —	— —	— —	— —	— —	— —	— —	— —	— —	— —	— —	— —	— —	— —	— —	1 —	— —		Pisces, Aquarius, Capricorn & Jones Ltd.	
1968	"D. W. Washburn" "It's Nice to Be with You"	19; 51	— —	10; 26	12; 31	11 —	— —	— —	2; 15	— —	19 —	7 —	20 —	— —	12 —	5 —	— 1	17 —		—N/a	
1968	"We Were Made for Each Other" "Dream World"	— —	— —	— —	— —	— —	— —	— —	— —	— —	— —	— —	— —	— —	— —	— —	2 —	— —		The Birds, the Bees & the Monkees	
1968	"Porpoise Song" "As We Go Along"	62; 106	— —	41 —	30 flip	57 —	— —	— —	26 —	— —	— —	— —	— —	— —	— —	— —	— —	— —		Head	
1968	"Mary, Mary" "What Am I Doing Hangin' 'Round?" (from Pisces, Aquarius, Capricorn & Jones Ltd.)	— —	— —	— —	— —	4 —	— —	— —	— —	— —	— —	— —	— —	— —	— —	— —	— —	— —		More of the Monkees	
1969	"Tear Drop City" "A Man Without a Dream"	56 —	— —	37; 127	33 —	28 —	— —	— —	27 —	— —	— —	— —	— —	— —	— —	— —	— —	44 —		Instant Replay	
1969	"Listen to the Band" "Someday Man" (non-album track)	63; 81	— —	57; 80	60; 74	8; 8	— —	— —	53; 74	— —	— —	— —	78 —	— —	— —	— —	— —	— 47		The Monkees Present	
1969	"Me Without You" "Don't Listen to Linda"	— —	— —	— —	— —	— —	— —	— —	— —	— —	— —	— —	— —	— —	— —	— —	7 —	— —		Instant Replay	
1969	"Good Clean Fun" "Mommy and Daddy"	82; 109	29 —	90; 101	73; 76	13; 13	— —	— —	80 —	— —	— —	— —	— —	— —	— —	— —	— —	— —		The Monkees Present	
1970	"Oh My My" "I Love You Better"	98 —	— —	94 —	109 —	34 —	— —	— —	— —	— —	— —	— —	— —	— —	— —	— —	— —	— —		Changes	
1971	"Do It in the Name of Love" ^{K} "Lady Jane" ^{K}	— —	— —	— —	— —	— —	— —	— —	— —	— —	— —	— —	93 —	— —	— —	— —	— —	— —		—N/a	
1975	"I Remember the Feeling" ^{L} "You and I" ^{L}	— —	— —	— —	— —	— —	— —	— —	— —	— —	— —	— —	— —	— —	— —	— —	— —	— —		Dolenz, Jones, Boyce & Hart	
1976	"I Love You (and I'm Glad That I Said It") ^{L} "Savin' My Love for You" ^{L}	— —	— —	— —	— —	— —	— —	— —	— —	— —	— —	— —	— —	— —	— —	— —	— —	— —		Dolenz, Jones, Boyce & Hart	
1976	"Daydream Believer" "Monkee's Theme"	— —	— —	101 —	108 —	— —	— —	— —	— —	— —	— —	— —	— —	— —	— —	— —	— —	— —		The Monkees Greatest Hits	
1976	"Christmas Is My Time of Year" ^{M} "White Christmas" (Davy Jones solo)	— —	— —	— —	— —	— —	— —	— —	— —	— —	— —	— —	— —	— —	— —	— —	— —	— —		—N/a	
1983	"Steam Engine" ^{N} "Rainbows" (Davy Jones solo)	— —	— —	— —	— —	— —	— —	— —	— —	— —	— —	— —	— —	— —	— —	— —	— —	— —		—N/a	
1986	"That Was Then, This Is Now" ^{O} "(theme from) The Monkees"	20 —	24 —	— —	— —	69 —	— —	— —	41 —	— —	— —	— —	— —	— —	— —	— —	— —	68 —		Then & Now... The Best of The Monkees	
1986	"Daydream Believer" (remix) "Randy Scouse Git"	79 —	— —	— —	— —	62 —	— —	— —	— —	— —	— —	— —	— —	— —	— —	— —	— —	— —		Then & Now... The Best of The Monkees	
1987	"Heart and Soul" "MGBGT" (live, from 20th Anniversary Tour 1986)	87 —	— —	— —	— —	— —	— —	— —	— —	— —	— —	— —	— —	— —	— —	— —	— —	— —		Pool It!	
1987	"Every Step of the Way" "(I'll) Love You Forever" (live, from 20th Anniversary Tour 1986)	— —	— —	— —	— —	— —	— —	— —	— —	— —	— —	— —	— —	— —	— —	— —	— —	— —		Pool It!	
2016	"She Makes Me Laugh" ^{P}	—	—	—	—	—	—	30	—	—	—	—	—	—	—	—	—	—		Good Times!	
2016	"You Bring the Summer" ^{P}	—	—	—	—	—	—	12	—	—	—	—	—	—	—	—	—	—		Good Times!	
2016	"Me & Magdalena" ^{P}	—	—	—	—	—	—	—	—	—	—	—	—	—	—	—	—	—		Good Times!	
2018	"Unwrap You at Christmas" ^{P}	—	—	—	—	—	—	—	—	—	—	—	—	—	—	—	—	—		Christmas Party	
2018	"What Would Santa Do" ^{P}	—	—	—	—	—	—	—	—	—	—	—	—	—	—	—	—	—		Christmas Party	

K: Released in Japan as The Monkees, and as Mickey Dolenz & Davy Jones elsewhere. The Japanese single failed to chart in 1971, but a 1981 reissue reached number 93.
L: Released as Dolenz, Jones, Boyce & Hart.
M: Released in 1976 as Micky Dolenz, Davy Jones and Peter Tork. A remixed reissue was released in 1986 as We Three Monkees.
N: Private pressing. Released at the 1983 Chicago Monkees Convention. Steam Engine was recorded in 1969.
O: Released as Micky Dolenz & Peter Tork of The Monkees due to a trademark dispute.
P: Digital-only single.
