= Monkeemania (The Very Best of the Monkees) =

Greatest hits album by The Monkees
- Released: 9 May 2011
- Recorded: 1966–1970
- Genre: Rock, pop
- Length: 2:34:17
- Producer: Tommy Boyce, Bobby Hart, Jack Keller, Jeff Barry, Michael Nesmith, Neil Sedaka, Carole Bayer Sager, Chip Douglas, Gerry Goffin, Carole King, Micky Dolenz, Davy Jones, Peter Tork, Bones Howe Michael Lloyd, Roger Bechirian, Felton Jarvis

The Monkees chronology
The Monkees: Original Album Series (2009)	Monkeemania (The Very Best of the Monkees) (2011)	Good Times! (2016)

Professional ratings
Review scores
Source	Rating
Allmusic	4.5/5 stars

Monkeemania (The Very Best of the Monkees) is a two-disc Monkees compilation released in 2011. It contains 57 of the Monkees' songs, including hit singles, B-sides, album tracks and rarities. Several of these songs were unreleased in the 1960s, but were eventually issued on the Monkees' Missing Links archival compilation albums.

This compilation is not to be confused with the Arista Records compilation album Monkeemania (40 Timeless Hits) that was issued in Australia in 1979.

== Track listing ==
=== Disc 1 ===
1. "(Theme From) The Monkees" (Tommy Boyce, Bobby Hart) – 2:20
2. "Last Train to Clarksville" (Boyce, Hart) – 2:46
3. "Take a Giant Step" (Gerry Goffin, Carole King) – 2:31
4. "Saturday's Child" (David Gates) - 2:44
5. "Papa Gene's Blues" (Michael Nesmith) - 1:59
6. "I Wanna Be Free" (album version) (Boyce, Hart) – 2:26
7. "I'm a Believer" (Neil Diamond) – 2:46
8. "(I'm Not Your) Steppin' Stone" (Boyce, Hart) – 2:23
9. "She" (Boyce, Hart) – 2:39
10. "Mary, Mary" (Nesmith) - 2:17
11. "Your Auntie Grizelda" (Diane Hildebrand, Jack Keller) - 2:29
12. "Look Out (Here Comes Tomorrow)" (extended mix) (Diamond) – 2:49
13. "Sometime in the Morning" (Goffin, King) - 2:29
14. "When Love Comes Knockin' (At Your Door)" (Neil Sedaka, Carole Bayer Sager) - 1:48
15. "A Little Bit Me, A Little Bit You" (Diamond) – 2:48
16. "She Hangs Out" (single version) (Jeff Barry) - 2:34
17. "The Girl I Knew Somewhere" (Nesmith) – 2:33
18. "All of Your Toys" (Bill Martin) - 3:09
19. "Randy Scouse Git (Alternate Title)" (Micky Dolenz) – 2:34
20. "You Just May Be the One" (Nesmith) - 2:04
21. "Forget That Girl" (Douglas Farthing Hatlelid) - 2:26
22. "Shades of Gray" (Barry Mann, Cynthia Weil) – 3:23
23. "For Pete's Sake (Closing Theme)" (Peter Tork, Joey Richards) – 2:11
24. "Sunny Girlfriend" (Nesmith) - 2:33
25. "You Told Me" (Nesmith) - 2:25
26. "No Time" (Hank Cicalo) - 2:09
27. "Salesman" (Craig Vincent Smith) - 2:36
28. "The Door into Summer" (Douglas, Martin) - 2:49
29. "Daily Nightly" (Nesmith) - 2:32
30. "Star Collector" (Goffin, King) - 4:24

=== Disc 2 ===
1. "Pleasant Valley Sunday" (Goffin, King) – 3:08
2. "Words" (Boyce, Hart) – 2:51
3. "What Am I Doing Hangin' 'Round?" (Michael Martin Murphey, Owen Castleman) – 3:08
4. "Cuddly Toy" (Harry Nilsson) – 2:40
5. "Daydream Believer" (John Stewart) – 2:58
6. "Goin' Down" (Dolenz, Hildebrand, Davy Jones, Nesmith, Tork) - 4:23
7. "Valleri" (Boyce, Hart) – 2:14
8. "I'll Be Back up on My Feet" (Sandy Linzer, Denny Randell) - 2:28
9. "P.O. Box 9847" (Boyce, Hart) - 3:15
10. "Tapioca Tundra" (Nesmith) - 3:06
11. "D.W. Washburn" (Leiber & Stoller) - 2:48
12. "Daddy's Song" (extended mix) (Nilsson) – 3:28
13. "Porpoise Song (Theme from Head)" (Goffin, King) – 4:13
14. "As We Go Along" (King, Toni Stern) – 3:54
15. "Can You Dig It?" (Tork) – 3:24
16. "Circle Sky" (alternate mix) (Nesmith) - 2:31
17. "Long Title: Do I Have to Do This All Over Again?" (Tork) – 2:39
18. "Tear Drop City" (Boyce, Hart) - 2:01
19. "A Man Without a Dream" (Goffin, King) – 3:03
20. "Someday Man" (Roger Nichols, Paul Williams) – 2:40
21. "Listen to the Band" (Nesmith) – 2:28
22. "Some of Shelly's Blues" (Nesmith) - 2:30
23. "How Insensitive" (Antonio Carlos Jobim, Vinicus DeMoraes, Norman Gimbel) - 2:32
24. "Good Clean Fun" (Nesmith) - 2:18
25. "Mommy and Daddy" (Dolenz) - 2:13
26. "Oh My My" (Barry, Andy Kim) - 3:01
27. "(Theme from) The Monkees" (TV version) (Boyce, Hart) – 0:50

=== Notes ===
- The extended mix of "Look Out (Here Comes Tomorrow)" presented here is not the one that features the narration by Peter Tork; it is the mix first released on Music Box and was featured in the episode "Monkees in Manhattan".

== Charts ==
Chart performance for Monkeemania (The Very Best of the Monkees)
Chart (2012)	Peak position
Scottish Albums (Official Charts)	77
UK Albums (Official Charts)	70
