= The A's, the B's, and the Monkees =

Compilation album of singles by the Monkees
- Released: January 30, 2026
- Recorded: 1966–1970
- Genre: Pop rock
- Length: 68:10
- Label: Rhino
- Producers: Tommy Boyce; Bobby Hart; Jack Keller; Michael Nesmith; Jeff Barry; Neil Sedaka; Carole Bayer Sager; Gerry Goffin; Carole King; Chip Douglas; the Monkees; Bones Howe; Felton Jarvis; Bill Chadwick

The Monkees chronology
Digital Dozen (2025)	The A's, the B's, and the Monkees (2026)

The A's, the B's, and the Monkees is a compilation of Colgems Records singles by the American pop rock band the Monkees, released on January 30, 2026, by Rhino Entertainment. The album's first disc contains all A-side singles the Monkees released on Colgems Records, while the second disc contains all the B-sides of those singles. It is the first in a line of releases for the 60th anniversary of the Monkees.

== Critical reception ==
Professional ratings
Review scores
Source	Rating
AllMusic	4/5 stars

Tony Peters called it a "surprisingly solid listen. You get the dizzying rush of initial hits on record one, followed by some rather interesting, and surprisingly listenable B sides on record two", noting that it "takes a fresh approach in compiling many of the highlights of this criminally under-appreciated band."

== Track listing ==
The A's
No.	Title	Writer(s)	Original album	Length
1.	"Last Train to Clarksville"	Boyce and Hart	The Monkees (1966)	2:24
2.	"I'm a Believer"	Neil Diamond	More of the Monkees (1967)	2:48
3.	"A Little Bit Me, a Little Bit You"	Diamond	Non-album single (1967)	2:38
4.	"Pleasant Valley Sunday"	Gerry Goffin; Carole King	Pisces, Aquarius, Capricorn & Jones Ltd. (1967)	3:09
5.	"Daydream Believer"	John Stewart	The Birds, the Bees & the Monkees (1968)	3:02
6.	"Valleri"	Boyce and Hart	The Birds, the Bees & the Monkees	2:18
7.	"D. W. Washburn"	Jerry Leiber and Mike Stoller	Non-album single (1968)	2:49
8.	"Porpoise Song"	Goffin; King	Head (1968)	4:04
9.	"Tear Drop City"	Boyce and Hart	Instant Replay (1969)	2:04
10.	"Listen to the Band"	Michael Nesmith	The Monkees Present (1969)	2:32
11.	"Good Clean Fun"	Nesmith	The Monkees Present	2:16
12.	"Oh My My"	Jeff Barry; Andy Kim	Changes (1970)	2:59

The B's
No.	Title	Writer(s)	Original release	Length
1.	"Take a Giant Step"	Goffin; King	The Monkees	2:36
2.	"(I'm Not Your) Steppin' Stone"	Tommy Boyce and Bobby Hart	More of the Monkees	2:33
3.	"The Girl I Knew Somewhere"	Nesmith	B-side only (1967)	2:38
4.	"Words"	Boyce and Hart	Pisces, Aquarius, Capricorn & Jones Ltd.	2:50
5.	"Goin' Down"	The Monkees; Diane Hildebrand	B-side only	4:00
6.	"Tapioca Tundra"	Nesmith	The Birds, the Bees & the Monkees	3:04
7.	"It's Nice to Be with You"	Jerry Goldstein	B-side only	2:54
8.	"As We Go Along"	King; Toni Stern	Head	3:57
9.	"A Man Without a Dream"	Goffin; King	Instant Replay	3:05
10.	"Someday Man"	Paul Williams; Roger Nichols	B-side only	2:42
11.	"Mommy and Daddy"	Dolenz	The Monkees Present	2:11
12.	"I Love You Better"	Barry; Kim	Changes	2:27
Total length:				68:10
