= Monkeemania (40 Timeless Hits) =

Greatest hits album by the Monkees
- Released: 1979
- Recorded: 1966–1970
- Genres: Rock, pop
- Length: 107:22
- Label: Arista
- Producers: Tommy Boyce, Bobby Hart, Jack Keller, Jeff Barry, Chip Douglas, Gerry Goffin, Carole King, Michael Nesmith, Micky Dolenz, Davy Jones, Peter Tork, Carole Bayer Sager, Neil Sedaka, Bill Chadwick, Bones Howe, Michael Lloyd, Roger Bechirian, Felton Jarvis

The Monkees chronology
| The Monkees Greatest Hits (1976) | Monkeemania (40 Timeless Hits) (1979) | More Greatest Hits of The Monkees (1982) |

Professional ratings
Review scores
| Source | Rating |
|---|---|
| AllMusic | 4/5 stars |

Monkeemania (40 Timeless Hits) is a Monkees compilation released in Australia and New Zealand in 1979 and 1980, respectively. It contains 40 of the Monkees' songs.

Previous Monkees compilations usually featured the six biggest hit A-sides from the group combined with more esoteric choices. By contrast, this compilation includes all six hit singles and their B-sides, popular tracks from the album and TV series, some of the more obscure singles and album tracks, and three previously unreleased tracks: "Love to Love," "Steam Engine," and a live version of "Circle Sky." The song selection made the album the most comprehensive Monkees compilation of its time.

The Monkees' master tapes in Australia were unavailable at that time so they opted for the use of "needledrop" vinyl recordings of songs, resulting in various sound quality issues.

The photo of the band used on the cover is a reversed image from the original.

== Track listing ==
LP 1

1. "(Theme from) The Monkees" (Tommy Boyce, Bobby Hart) – 2:17
2. "Last Train to Clarksville" (Boyce, Hart) – 2:48
3. "(I'm Not Your) Steppin' Stone" (Boyce, Hart) – 2:21
4. "I'm a Believer" (Neil Diamond) – 2:42
5. "A Little Bit Me, a Little Bit You" (Diamond) – 2:49
6. "Look Out (Here Comes Tomorrow)" (Diamond) – 2:12
7. "She" (Boyce, Hart) – 2:37
8. "Words" (Boyce, Hart) – 2:46
9. "Saturday's Child" (David Gates) - 2:40
10. "Cuddly Toy" (Harry Nilsson) - 2:35
11. "Take a Giant Step" (Gerry Goffin, Carole King) - 2:30
12. "Sometime in the Morning" (Goffin, King) - 2:27
13. "Pleasant Valley Sunday" (Goffin, King) - 3:12
14. "Star Collector" (Goffin, King) - 3:30
15. "Sweet Young Thing" (Goffin, King, Michael Nesmith) - 1:54
16. "Porpoise Song" (Theme from Head) (Goffin, King) - 4:00
17. "As We Go Along" (King, Toni Stern) - 3:53
18. "Shades of Gray" (Barry Mann, Cynthia Weil) - 3:20
19. "Love Is Only Sleeping" (Mann, Weil) - 2:23
20. "The Girl I Left Behind Me" (Neil Sedaka, Carole Bayer Sager) - 2:42

LP 2

1. "Mary, Mary" (Nesmith) - 2:10
2. "Randy Scouse Git (Alternate Title)" (Micky Dolenz) – 2:32
3. "The Girl I Knew Somewhere" (Nesmith) – 2:32
4. "You and I" (Bill Chadwick, Davy Jones) - 2:10
5. "Tapioca Tundra" (Nesmith) - 3:06
6. "Mommy and Daddy" (Dolenz) - 2:10
7. "For Pete's Sake" (Joey Richards, Peter Tork) - 2:10
8. "Good Clean Fun" (Nesmith) - 2:15
9. "Listen to the Band" (Nesmith) - 2:45
10. "Circle Sky" (live) (Nesmith) - 2:32
11. "Daydream Believer" (John Stewart) – 2:55
12. "What Am I Doing Hanging 'Round" (Michael Martin Murphey, Owen Castleman) – 3:02
13. "D.W. Washburn" (Leiber & Stoller) - 2:43
14. "Valleri" (Boyce, Hart) - 2:15
15. "Looking for the Good Times" (Boyce, Hart) - 2:00
16. "Someday Man" (Roger Nichols, Paul Williams) – 2:38
17. "Oh, My, My" (Jeff Barry, Andy Kim) - 2:56
18. "Steam Engine" (Chip Douglas) - 2:21
19. "Love to Love" (Diamond) - 2:35
20. "Goin' Down" (Dolenz, Diane Hildebrand, Jones, Nesmith, Tork) - 3:57
21. "Tema Dei Monkees" (Boyce, Hart, Nistri) - 2:16

== Chart ==
Original album
| Chart (1979) | Peak position |
|---|---|
| Australian Albums (Kent Music Report) | 37 |
