= Hit Factory (album) =

Compilation album by the Monkees
- Released: 1985
- Recorded: 1966–1969
- Genre: Rock
- Label: Pair
- Producer: Tommy Boyce, Bobby Hart, Jack Keller, Michael Nesmith, Neil Sedaka, Carole Bayer Sager, Chip Douglas, The Monkees, Micky Dolenz

The Monkees chronology
Monkee Flips (1984)	Hit Factory (1985)	Then & Now... The Best of The Monkees (1986)

Professional ratings
Review scores
Source	Rating
AllMusic	2/5 stars

Hit Factory is a compilation album of songs by the Monkees, released by Pair Records in 1985 and licensed from Arista Records. The album was available as a two-record set or single cassette and sold surprisingly well the year following its release, after the Pleasant Valley Sunday MTV marathon of their television series in February 1986 reawakened interest in the Monkees.

Despite its title, the album did not include a full selection of hit singles, instead featuring a mixture of hits, B-sides and album tracks, including then-rarely heard songs from the Monkees' 1968 film Head and their 1969 albums Instant Replay and The Monkees Present. The Billboard chart hit "Tapioca Tundra" (No. 34) makes its U.S. compilation debut here.

The photo of the band used on the cover is a flipped image from the original.

== Track listing ==
Side one
No.	Title	Source	Length
1.	"(Theme From) The Monkees" (Tommy Boyce, Bobby Hart)	From The Monkees (1966)	2:17
2.	"Tomorrow's Gonna Be Another Day" (Steve Venet, Boyce)	From The Monkees	2:33
3.	"I'll Be True to You (Yes I Will)" (Gerry Goffin, Russ Titelman)	From The Monkees	2:48
4.	"Sweet Young Thing" (Goffin, Carole King, Michael Nesmith)	From The Monkees	1:55

Side two
No.	Title	Source	Length
1.	"When Love Comes Knocking (At Your Door)" (Neil Sedaka, Carole Bayer Sager)	From More of the Monkees (1967)	1:45
2.	"Forget That Girl" (Chip Douglas)	B-side of "Randy Scouse Git"; from Headquarters (1967)	2:21
3.	"D.W. Washburn" (Jerry Leiber, Mike Stoller)	Single A-side (1968)	2:47
4.	"Can You Dig It?" (Peter Tork)	From Head (1968)	3:19

Side three
No.	Title	Source	Length
1.	"Last Train to Clarksville" (Boyce, Hart)	Single A-side; from The Monkees	2:40
2.	"Tapioca Tundra" (Nesmith)	B-side of "Valleri"; from The Birds, The Bees & The Monkees (1968)	3:03
3.	"Through the Looking Glass" (Boyce, Hart, Red Baldwin)	From Instant Replay (1969)	2:41
4.	"Shorty Blackwell" (Micky Dolenz)	From Instant Replay	5:42

Side four
No.	Title	Source	Length
1.	"Porpoise Song" (Goffin, King)	Single A-side. LP version; from Head	3:00
2.	"I'll Be Back Up on My Feet" (Sandy Linzer, Denny Randell)	From The Birds, The Bees & The Monkees	2:27
3.	"Little Girl" (Dolenz)	From The Monkees Present (1969)	1:59
4.	"Looking for the Good Times" (Boyce, Hart)	From The Monkees Present	2:15
