= The Monkees Live: The Mike and Micky Show =

The Monkees Live: The Mike & Micky Show

Live album by The Monkees
- Released: April 3, 2020
- Recorded: March and June 2019
- Genre: Pop rock
- Length: 78:04
- Label: Rhino
- Producer: Andrew Sandoval

The Monkees chronology
Christmas Party (2018)	The Monkees Live: The Mike & Micky Show (2020)

The Monkees Live: The Mike and Micky Show is a 2020 live album by The Monkees, recorded in March and June 2019, during the band's successful tour. The concerts marked the first time that surviving Monkees Micky Dolenz and Michael Nesmith toured as a duo. The album is the first Monkees release following the death of Peter Tork in February 2019, and the last album to feature Nesmith prior to his December 2021 death.

In addition to hits such as "Last Train to Clarksville," "I'm a Believer," and "Pleasant Valley Sunday," and songs from the band's television show, such as "Mary, Mary" and "Papa Gene's Blues", the album contains Nesmith compositions "St. Matthew," "Tapioca Tundra," and "Auntie's Municipal Court." The album also includes songs from the acclaimed 2016 album Good Times!.

Additionally notable is the return of Dolenz on lead vocal on "For Pete's Sake", the closing theme to the second season of The Monkees. Dolenz originally sang the lead vocal on Headquarters, but the song was given to Tork to sing during their reunion concerts, since he co-wrote it.

The Monkees Live: The Mike and Micky Show reached No. 178 on the Billboard 200 chart. The album was released in CD and vinyl formats.

Professional ratings
Review scores
Source	Rating
AllMusic	3.5/5 stars
Record Collector	4/4 stars

== Track listing ==
All songs written by Michael Nesmith, except where noted.

No.	Title	Writer(s)	Lead vocal	Length
1.	"Last Train to Clarksville"	Tommy Boyce; Bobby Hart	Micky Dolenz	3:06
2.	"Sunny Girlfriend"		Nesmith	2:39
3.	"Mary, Mary"		Dolenz	2:42
4.	"You Told Me"		Nesmith	2:27
5.	"For Pete's Sake"	Peter Tork; Joey Richards	Dolenz	2:18
6.	"The Door into Summer"	Chip Douglas; Bill Martin	Nesmith	3:21
7.	"You Just May Be the One"		Nesmith	2:07
8.	"A Little Bit Me, a Little Bit You"	Neil Diamond	Dolenz	2:44
9.	"The Girl I Knew Somewhere"		Dolenz	2:51
10.	"Birth of an Accidental Hipster"	Noel Gallagher; Paul Weller	Nesmith; Dolenz	3:31
11.	"St. Matthew"		Nesmith	2:54
12.	"As We Go Along"	Carole King; Toni Stern	Dolenz	4:15
13.	"Circle Sky"		Nesmith	2:37
14.	"Pleasant Valley Sunday"	Gerry Goffin; King	Dolenz	3:15
15.	"Papa Gene's Blues"		Nesmith	3:54
16.	"Randy Scouse Git"	Dolenz	Dolenz	3:49
17.	"Tapioca Tundra"		Nesmith	3:46
18.	"Me and Magdalena"	Ben Gibbard	Nesmith with Dolenz	3:33
19.	"Auntie's Municipal Court"	Nesmith; Keith Allison	Dolenz	4:46
20.	"Goin' Down"	Dolenz; Davy Jones; Tork; Nesmith; Diane Hildebrand	Dolenz	3:08
21.	"Sweet Young Thing"	Nesmith; Goffin; King	Nesmith	2:30
22.	"(I'm Not Your) Steppin' Stone"	Boyce; Hart	Dolenz	2:56
23.	"Daydream Believer"	John Stewart	Dolenz	3:36
24.	"Listen to the Band"		Nesmith	2:08
25.	"I'm a Believer"	Diamond	Dolenz	3:11
Total length:				78:04

== Personnel ==
- Micky Dolenz – vocals, guitar, percussion
- Michael Nesmith – vocals, guitar
- Christian Nesmith – backing vocals, guitar
- Wayne Avers – guitar, arranger
- Alex Jules – backing vocals, keyboards
- Probyn Gregory – banjo, acoustic guitar, trumpet, melodica
- John Billings – bass
- Rich Dart – drums
- Pete Finney – pedal steel guitar, acoustic guitar
- Coco Dolenz – backing vocals, percussion
- Circe Link – backing vocals, percussion

Production staff

- Andrew Sandoval – producer
- Christian Nesmith – recording mixer
- Matthew Littlejohn – sound engineer
- Dan Hersch – mastering

== Charts ==
Chart (2020)	Peak position
US Billboard 200	178
US Top Album Sales (Billboard)	13
Hungarian Albums (MAHASZ)	15
