= The Best of The Monkees =

The Best of the Monkees

Greatest hits album by the Monkees
- Released: April 23, 2003
- Recorded: 1966–1969
- Genre: Rock, pop
- Length: 1:07:56
- Label: Rhino
- Producer: Andrew Sandoval

The Monkees chronology
| 2001: Live in Las Vegas (2001) | The Best of the Monkees (2003) | Extended Versions (2003) |

Professional ratings
Review scores
| Source | Rating |
|---|---|
| Allmusic | 5/5 stars |

The Best of the Monkees is a Monkees compilation released by Rhino Entertainment. It contains 25 songs from the Monkees' repertoire, listed in chronological order by release date. Also included is a bonus karaoke CD with five tracks. Unlike previous Rhino compilations, this one does not include any material from the 1980s or 1990s reunions, focusing strictly on the band's 1960s output.

The Best of the Monkees replaced The Monkees Greatest Hits, released in 1995 in anticipation of the band's 30th anniversary celebration the following year.

The album debuted on the Billboard 200 in the issue dated May 17, 2003, at number 51. It spent six weeks on the chart. Following the death of member Davy Jones on February 29, 2012, it re-entered at No. 20 with 17,000 copies sold (up 7,808 percent according to Nielsen SoundScan) for the week ending March 4, 2012. The album has since been certified Gold for selling 500,000 copies.

== Track listing ==
1. "(Theme From) The Monkees" (Tommy Boyce, Bobby Hart) – 2:18
2. "Last Train to Clarksville" (Boyce, Hart) – 2:46
3. "I Wanna Be Free" (Boyce, Hart) – 2:24
4. "Papa Gene's Blues" (Michael Nesmith) – 1:59
5. "I'm a Believer" (Neil Diamond) – 2:46
6. "(I'm Not Your) Steppin' Stone" (Boyce, Hart) – 2:24
7. "She" (Boyce, Hart) – 2:39
8. "Mary, Mary" (Nesmith) – 2:17
9. "Your Auntie Grizelda" (Diane Hildebrand, Jack Keller) – 2:28
10. "Look Out (Here Comes Tomorrow)" (Diamond) – 2:15
11. "Sometime in the Morning" (Gerry Goffin, Carole King) – 2:28
12. "A Little Bit Me, a Little Bit You" (Diamond) – 2:47
13. "The Girl I Knew Somewhere" (Nesmith) – 2:34
14. "Shades of Gray" (Barry Mann, Cynthia Weil) – 3:21
15. "Randy Scouse Git" (Micky Dolenz) – 2:33
16. "For Pete's Sake" (Peter Tork, Joey Richards) – 2:10
17. "You Just May Be the One" (Nesmith) – 2:03
18. "Pleasant Valley Sunday" (Goffin, King) – 3:15
19. "Words" (Boyce, Hart) – 2:51
20. "Daydream Believer" (John Stewart) – 2:59
21. "Goin' Down" (Hildebrand, Tork, Nesmith, Dolenz, Davy Jones) – 4:23
22. "What Am I Doing Hanging 'Round" (Michael Martin Murphey, Owen Castleman) – 3:07
23. "Valleri" (Boyce, Hart) – 2:20
24. ""Porpoise Song" (Theme from "Head") (Goffin, King) – 4:10
25. "Listen to the Band" (Nesmith) – 2:28

=== Bonus Karaoke CD+G ===
1. "(Theme from) The Monkees" (Boyce, Hart) – 1:25
2. "I'm a Believer" (Diamond) - 3:13
3. "(I'm Not Your) Steppin' Stone" (Boyce, Hart) - 2:49
4. "Pleasant Valley Sunday" (Goffin, King) – 3:39
5. "Daydream Believer" (Stewart) – 3:14

== Charts ==
| Chart (2003) | Peak position |
|---|---|
| US Billboard 200 | 20 |

== Certifications ==
| Region | Certification | Certified units/sales |
|---|---|---|
| United States (RIAA) | Gold | 500,000^{^} |
^{^} Shipments figures based on certification alone.
