= Then & Now... The Best of The Monkees =

Compilation album by The Monkees
- Released: June 1986
- Recorded: 1966–1969; 1986
- Genre: Pop rock
- Label: Arista
- Producer: Various

The Monkees chronology
Hit Factory (1985)	Then & Now... The Best of The Monkees (1986)	20th Anniversary Tour 1986 (1987)

Professional ratings
Review scores
Source	Rating
AllMusic	4.5/5 stars

Then & Now... the Best of The Monkees is a compilation album of songs by the 1960s American pop group the Monkees, released by Arista Records in 1986.

With the 1986 revival of "Monkeemania", Arista Records issued a new Monkees "best of" collection, including three new recordings featuring vocals by Micky Dolenz and Peter Tork: "That Was Then, This Is Now", "Anytime, Anyplace, Anywhere" and a remake of the Paul Revere and the Raiders hit, "Kicks". Neither Michael Nesmith nor Davy Jones participated in the new recordings. Nesmith also did not join the 1986 tour with the reassembled Monkees (aside from joining them for an encore in one show), while Jones did. However, Jones would leave the stage when the new songs were performed.

"That Was Then, This Is Now" was issued as a single and charted at No. 20 in the U.S. during that year. Its follow-up, a remix of "Daydream Believer" (featuring a modern drum sound), hit No. 79. At the end of the print run of Then and Now..., Arista inadvertently replaced the original version of "Daydream Believer" with this updated remix on the records and cassettes. The second vinyl version is denoted by an "RE-1" etched into the LP's inner groove.

The track listings for the LP and CD releases differed greatly, with the LP version featuring 14 tracks and the CD version expanded to 25. At the time of its release, the CD version was the most comprehensive career-spanning Monkees compilation to date in the U.S.

Originally, Arista had decided to release a 2-LP set with only classic material. After the decision was made to include new material, the 2-LP set got released as a mail-order collection from Silver Eagle Records. This album contains the same front and back images as the later release, but the title is simply The Best of the Monkees (missing the Then & Now) and there are no liner notes. This rare version of the album has 24 tracks, closer to the lineup on the Then & Now CD but with a slightly different order and song selection. "Mary, Mary", "Good Clean Fun" and "Tear Drop City" appear in place of the three new tracks, while "Look Out (Here Comes Tomorrow)" would not be added until the Then & Now CD release.

== Track listing ==
=== Arista CD ===
No.	Title	Source	Length
1.	"(Theme From) The Monkees" (Tommy Boyce, Bobby Hart)	From The Monkees (1966)	2:21
2.	"Last Train to Clarksville" (Boyce, Hart)	Single A-side; from The Monkees	2:44
3.	"Take a Giant Step" (Gerry Goffin, Carole King)	B-side of "Last Train to Clarksville"; from The Monkees	2:36
4.	"(I'm Not Your) Stepping Stone" (Boyce, Hart)	B-side of "I'm a Believer"; from More of the Monkees (1967)	2:25
5.	"She" (Boyce, Hart)	From More of the Monkees	2:39
6.	"A Little Bit Me, A Little Bit You" (Neil Diamond)	Single A-side (1967)	2:52
7.	"I'm a Believer" (Diamond)	Single A-side; from More of the Monkees	2:46
8.	"(Look Out) Here Comes Tomorrow" (Diamond)	From More of the Monkees	2:15
9.	"Sometime in the Morning" (Goffin, King)	From More of the Monkees	2:30
10.	"The Girl I Knew Somewhere" (Michael Nesmith)	B-side of "A Little Bit Me, A Little Bit You"	2:32
11.	"Randy Scouse Git" (Micky Dolenz)	Single A-side in the U.K.; from Headquarters (1967)	2:35
12.	"You Just May Be the One" (Nesmith)	From Headquarters	2:03
13.	"For Pete's Sake" (Peter Tork, Joey Richards)	Closing theme for season 2 of the TV show; from Headquarters	2:12
14.	"Pleasant Valley Sunday" (Goffin, King)	Single A-side; from Pisces, Aquarius, Capricorn & Jones, Ltd. (1967)	3:13
15.	"What Am I Doing Hangin' Round?" (Michael Martin Murphey, Owens Castleman)	From Pisces, Aquarius, Capricorn & Jones, Ltd.	3:06
16.	"Words" (Boyce, Hart)	B-side of "Pleasant Valley Sunday"; from Pisces, Aquarius, Capricorn & Jones, Ltd.	2:55
17.	"Goin' Down" (The Monkees, Diane Hildebrand)	B-side of "Daydream Believer" (1967)	4:25
18.	"Daydream Believer" (John Stewart)	Single A-side; from The Birds, The Bees & The Monkees (1968)	2:58
19.	"Valleri" (Boyce, Hart)	Single A-side; from The Birds, The Bees & The Monkees	2:18
20.	"D.W. Washburn" (Jerry Leiber, Mike Stoller)	Single A-side (1968)	2:50
21.	"Porpoise Song (Theme from Head)" (Goffin, King)	Single version; from Head (1968)	4:13
22.	"Listen to the Band" (Nesmith)	Single A-side; from The Monkees Present (1969)	2:45
23.	"That Was Then, This Is Now" (Vance Brescia)	New track (1986)	4:02
24.	"Anytime, Anyplace, Anywhere" (Hart, Dick Eastman)	New track (1986)	3:53
25.	"Kicks" (Barry Mann, Cynthia Weil)	New track (1986)	3:00

- "Listen to the Band" is the full-length mono album version. "Last Train to Clarksville" and "Take a Giant Step" are mono as well. All other tracks are stereo.
- "Valleri" marks the first appearance of the song with a "cold ending" as opposed to a fade-out.
- "Porpoise Song" is the extended single version.

=== Arista LP ===
Side one
No.	Title	Source	Length
1.	"(Theme From) The Monkees" (Boyce, Hart)	From The Monkees	2:21
2.	"Last Train to Clarksville" (Boyce, Hart)	Single A-side; from The Monkees	2:44
3.	"Take a Giant Step" (Goffin, King)	B-side of "Last Train to Clarksville"; from The Monkees	2:36
4.	"I'm a Believer" (Diamond)	Single A-side; from More of the Monkees	2:46
5.	"(I'm Not Your) Stepping Stone" (Boyce, Hart)	B-side of "I'm a Believer"; from More of the Monkees	2:25
6.	"A Little Bit Me, A Little Bit You" (Diamond)	Single A-side	2:52
7.	"Anytime, Anyplace, Anywhere" (Hart, Eastman)	New track	3:53

Side two
No.	Title	Source	Length
1.	"That Was Then, This Is Now" (Brescia)	New track	4:02
2.	"The Girl I Knew Somewhere" (Nesmith)	B-side of "A Little Bit Me, A Little Bit You"	2:32
3.	"Pleasant Valley Sunday" (Goffin, King)	Single A-side; from Pisces, Aquarius, Capricorn & Jones, Ltd.	3:13
4.	"What Am I Doing Hangin' Round?" (Murphey, Castleman)	From Pisces, Aquarius, Capricorn & Jones, Ltd.	3:06
5.	"Daydream Believer" (Stewart)	Single A-side; from The Birds, The Bees & The Monkees	2:58
6.	"Valleri" (Boyce, Hart)	Single A-side; from The Birds, The Bees & The Monkees	2:18
7.	"Kicks" (Mann, Weil)	New track	3:00

=== Silver Eagle 2-LP ===
Side one
No.	Title	Source	Length
1.	"(Theme From) The Monkees" (Boyce, Hart)	From The Monkees	2:21
2.	"Last Train to Clarksville" (Boyce, Hart)	Single A-side; from The Monkees	2:44
3.	"Take a Giant Step" (Goffin, King)	B-side of "Last Train to Clarksville"; from The Monkees	2:36
4.	"(I'm Not Your) Stepping Stone" (Boyce, Hart)	B-side of "I'm a Believer"; from More of the Monkees	2:25
5.	"Mary, Mary" (Nesmith)	From "More of the Monkees"	2:16
6.	"A Little Bit Me, A Little Bit You" (Diamond)	Single A-side	2:52

Side two
No.	Title	Source	Length
1.	"I'm a Believer" (Diamond)	Single A-side; from More of the Monkees	2:46
2.	"She" (Boyce, Hart)	From More of the Monkees	2:39
3.	"Sometime in the Morning" (Goffin, King)	From More of the Monkees	2:30
4.	"The Girl I Knew Somewhere" (Nesmith)	B-side of "A Little Bit Me, A Little Bit You"	2:32
5.	"You Just May Be the One" (Nesmith)	From Headquarters	2:03
6.	"Randy Scouse Git" (Dolenz)	Single A-side in the U.K.; from Headquarters	2:35

Side three
No.	Title	Source	Length
1.	"Pleasant Valley Sunday" (Goffin, King)	Single A-side; from Pisces, Aquarius, Capricorn & Jones, Ltd.	3:13
2.	"What Am I Doing Hangin' Round?" (Murphey, Castleman)	From Pisces, Aquarius, Capricorn & Jones, Ltd.	3:06
3.	"Words" (Boyce, Hart)	B-side of "Pleasant Valley Sunday"; from Pisces, Aquarius, Capricorn & Jones, Ltd.	2:55
4.	"Goin' Down" (The Monkees, Hildebrand)	B-side of "Daydream Believer"	4:25
5.	"Valleri" (Boyce, Hart)	Single A-side; from The Birds, The Bees & The Monkees	2:18
6.	"Porpoise Song (Theme from Head)" (Goffin, King)	Single version; from Head	4:13

Side four
No.	Title	Source	Length
1.	"Daydream Believer" (Stewart)	Single A-side; from The Birds, The Bees & The Monkees	2:58
2.	"D.W. Washburn" (Leiber, Stoller)	Single A-side	2:50
3.	"Good Clean Fun" (Nesmith)	Single A-side; from The Monkees Present	2:19
4.	"Tear Drop City" (Boyce, Hart)	Single A-side; from Instant Replay	1:59
5.	"Listen to the Band" (Nesmith)	Single A-side; from The Monkees Present	2:45
6.	"For Pete's Sake" (Tork, Richards)	Closing theme for Season 2 of the TV show; from Headquarters	2:12

== Charts ==
Original album
Chart (1986)	Peak position
Australian Albums (Kent Music Report)	35
US Billboard 200	21

== Certifications and sales ==
Region	Certification	Certified units/sales
United States (RIAA)	Platinum	1,000,000^{^}
^{^} Shipments figures based on certification alone.
