= The Monkees: Original Album Series =

Box set by The Monkees
- Released: 2009
- Recorded: 1966–1968
- Genres: Rock, pop
- Label: Rhino
- Producers: Tommy Boyce, Bobby Hart, Jack Keller, Michael Nesmith, Neil Sedaka, Carole Bayer Sager, Jeff Barry, Gerry Goffin, Carole King, Chip Douglas, Micky Dolenz, Davy Jones, Peter Tork

The Monkees chronology
| Extended Versions (2003) | The Monkees: Original Album Series (2009) | Monkeemania (The Very Best of the Monkees) (2011) |

Professional ratings
Review scores
| Source | Rating |
|---|---|
| Allmusic | 3/5 stars |

The Monkees: Original Album Series is a CD set by The Monkees which includes the first five albums by The Monkees. The CD set was released in 2009 as a slipcased box set.

== Track listings ==
=== The Monkees (1966) ===
1. "(Theme from) The Monkees" (Tommy Boyce, Bobby Hart) – 2:21
2. "Saturday's Child" (David Gates) - 2:44
3. "I Wanna Be Free" (Boyce, Hart) – 2:27
4. "Tomorrow's Gonna Be Another Day" (Boyce, Steve Venet) - 2:39
5. "Papa Gene's Blues" (Michael Nesmith) - 2:00
6. "Take a Giant Step" (Gerry Goffin, Carole King) – 2:31
7. "Last Train to Clarksville" (Boyce, Hart) – 2:47
8. "This Just Doesn't Seem to Be My Day" (Boyce, Hart) – 2:09
9. "Let's Dance On" (Boyce, Hart) – 2:32
10. "I'll Be True to You (Yes I Will)" (Goffin, Russ Titelman) - 2:49
11. "Sweet Young Thing" (Goffin, King, Nesmith) - 1:58
12. "Gonna Buy Me a Dog" (Boyce, Hart) – 2:44

==== 1994 reissue bonus tracks ====
1. "I Can't Get Her off My Mind" (first recorded version) (Boyce, Hart) - 2:55
2. "I Don't Think You Know Me" (first recorded version) (Micky's vocal) (Goffin, King) - 2:18
3. "(Theme from) The Monkees" (first recorded version) (Boyce, Hart) – 0:52

=== More of the Monkees (1967) ===
1. "She" (Boyce, Hart) – 2:41
2. "When Love Comes Knockin' (At Your Door)" (Neil Sedaka, Carole Bayer Sager) - 1:49
3. "Mary, Mary" (Nesmith) - 2:16
4. "Hold on Girl (Help is on its Way)" (Billy Carr, Jack Keller, Ben Raleigh) - 2:29
5. "Your Auntie Grizelda" (Diane Hildebrand, Keller) - 2:30
6. "(I'm Not Your) Steppin' Stone" (Boyce, Hart) – 2:25
7. "Look Out (Here Comes Tomorrow)" (Neil Diamond) – 2:16
8. "The Kind of Girl I Could Love" (Roger Atkins, Nesmith) - 1:53
9. "The Day We Fall in Love" (Sandy Linzer, Denny Randell) - 2:26
10. "Sometime in the Morning" (Goffin, King) - 2:30
11. "Laugh" (Mitch Margo, Phil Margo, Hank Medress, Jay Siegal) - 2:30
12. "I'm a Believer" (Diamond) – 2:50

==== 1994 reissue bonus tracks ====
1. "Don't Listen to Linda" (first recorded version) (Boyce, Hart) – 2:28
2. "I'll Spend My Life with You" (first recorded version) (Boyce, Hart) – 2:30
3. "I Don't Think You Know Me" (second recorded version) (Goffin, King) - 2:19
4. "Look Out (Here Comes Tomorrow) (extended mix) (with Peter's narration)" (Diamond) – 2:52
5. "I'm a Believer" (take 4A) (Diamond) – 2:52

=== Headquarters (1967) ===
1. "You Told Me" (Nesmith) - 2:25
2. "I'll Spend My Life with You" (Boyce, Hart) – 2:26
3. "Forget That Girl" (Douglas Farthing Hatlelid) - 2:25
4. "Band 6" (Micky Dolenz, Davy Jones, Nesmith, Peter Tork) - 0:41
5. "You Just May Be the One" (Nesmith) - 2:03
6. "Shades of Gray" (Barry Mann, Cynthia Weil) – 3:22
7. "I Can't Get Her off My Mind" (Boyce, Hart) - 2:27
8. "For Pete's Sake" (Tork, Joey Richards) – 2:11
9. "Mr. Webster" (Boyce, Hart) - 2:04
10. "Sunny Girlfriend" (Nesmith) - 2:33
11. "Zilch" (Dolenz, Jones, Nesmith, Tork) - 1:06
12. "No Time" (Hank Cicalo) - 2:08
13. "Early Morning Blues and Greens" (Hildebrand, Keller) - 2:35
14. "Randy Scouse Git (Alternate Title)" (Dolenz) – 2:40

==== 1995 reissue bonus tracks ====
1. "All of Your Toys" (single mix) (Bill Martin) - 3:02
2. "The Girl I Knew Somewhere" (first recorded version) (Nesmith) – 2:38
3. "Peter Gunn's Gun" (jam session) (Henry Mancini) - 3:38
4. "Jericho" (studio dialogue) (Traditional) - 2:02
5. "Nine Times Blue" (demo version) (Nesmith) - 2:07
6. "Pillow Time" (demo version) (Janelle Scott, Matt Willis) - 4:00

=== Pisces, Aquarius, Capricorn & Jones Ltd. (1967) ===
1. "Salesman" (Craig Vincent Smith) - 2:38
2. "She Hangs Out" (Jeff Barry) - 2:57
3. "The Door into Summer" (Douglas, Martin) - 2:49
4. "Love is Only Sleeping" (Mann, Weil) - 2:31
5. "Cuddly Toy" (Harry Nilsson) – 2:38
6. "Words" (Boyce, Hart) – 2:51
7. "Hard to Believe" (Eddie Brick, Kim Capli, Jones, Charlie Rockett) - 2:37
8. "What Am I Doing Hanging 'Round" (Michael Martin Murphey, Owen Castleman) – 3:09
9. "Peter Percival Patterson's Pet Pig Porky" (Tork) - 0:27
10. "Pleasant Valley Sunday" (Goffin, King) – 3:15
11. "Daily Nightly" (Nesmith) - 2:33
12. "Don't Call on Me" (John London, Nesmith) - 2:51
13. "Star Collector" (Goffin, King) - 4:27

==== 1995 reissue bonus tracks ====
1. "Special Announcement" (arr. Tork) - 0:36
2. "Goin' Down" (extended mono mix) (Dolenz, Hildebrand, Jones, Nesmith, Tork) - 4:46
3. "Salesman" (alternate mono mix) (Smith) - 2:36
4. "The Door into Summer" (alternate mono mix) (Douglas, Martin) - 2:52
5. "Love is Only Sleeping" (early alternate mix) (Mann, Weil) - 2:32
6. "Daily Nightly" (early alternate mix) (Nesmith) - 2:31
7. "Star Collector" (extended mix) (Goffin, King) - 4:52

=== The Birds, The Bees & The Monkees (1968) ===
1. "Dream World" (Jones, Steve Pitts) - 3:21
2. "Auntie's Municipal Court" (Keith Allison, Nesmith) - 4:04
3. "We Were Made for Each Other" (Carole Bayer Sager, George Fischoff) - 2:25
4. "Tapioca Tundra" (Nesmith) - 3:07
5. "Daydream Believer" (John Stewart) – 3:00
6. "Writing Wrongs" (Nesmith) - 5:08
7. "I'll Be Back up on My Feet" (Linzer, Randell) - 2:26
8. "The Poster" (Jones, Pitts) - 2:21
9. "P.O. Box 9847" (Boyce, Hart) - 3:16
10. "Magnolia Simms" (Nesmith) - 3:48
11. "Valleri" (Boyce, Hart) – 2:15
12. "Zor and Zam" (Bill Chadwick, John Chadwick) - 2:10

==== 1994 reissue bonus tracks ====
1. "Alvin" (Nicholas Thorkelson, Tork) - 0:27
2. "I'm Gonna Try" (Jones, Pitts) - 2:44
3. "P.O. Box 9847" (early alternate mix) (Boyce, Hart) - 3:15
4. "The Girl I Left Behind Me" (first recorded version) (Sedaka, Bayer) - 2:40
5. "Lady's Baby" (alternate mix) (Tork) - 2:29

=== Notes ===
- Several of the songs from the CD set may suffer from dropouts in the sound, despite being remastered. While the first and fourth CDs do not appear to contain any defects, the second, third and fifth CDs do. These problems are especially found on the songs "Jericho" from the third CD and "P.O. Box 9847", "Magnolia Simms", "Valleri", "I'm Gonna Try" and "The Girl I Left Behind Me" from the fifth CD.
- The biggest issue with the dropouts is in the fifth CD when "The Girl I Left Behind Me" unexpectedly drops out and changes into "Dream World". When Track 16 ends, the redundant "Dream World" continues uninterrupted into what should have been "Lady's Baby". During Track 17, "Dream World" finishes maturely and "Auntie's Municipal Court" starts, but it stops immediately where "Lady's Baby" should have ended.
