= Daydream Believer and Other Hits =

Greatest hits album by The Monkees
- Released: March 17, 1998
- Recorded: 1967–1970
- Genre: Rock, pop
- Length: 28:35
- Label: Rhino, Flashback
- Producer: Chip Douglas, Micky Dolenz, Davy Jones, Michael Nesmith, Peter Tork, Jeff Barry

The Monkees chronology
I'm a Believer and Other Hits (1997)	Daydream Believer and Other Hits (1998)	The Monkees Anthology (1998)

Professional ratings
Review scores
Source	Rating
Allmusic	2.5/5 stars

Daydream Believer and Other Hits is a budget-price Monkees compilation released in 1998. It contained 10 of The Monkees' greatest hits, plus lesser-known classics. The album did not include any material from the 1980s or 1990s reunions, focusing strictly on the band's 1960s output.

Daydream Believer and Other Hits included both sides to the "Pleasant Valley Sunday", "Valleri" and "D. W. Washburn" singles, as well as the A-sides of the "Daydream Believer", "Good Clean Fun" and "Oh, My, My" single releases. "You Can't Tie a Mustang Down" is a bubblegum rocker that makes its debut here. The track was recorded during the "A Little Bit Me, A Little Bit You" sessions in January 1967, their last with music supervisor Don Kirshner.

By the time these later singles were issued, most of the album mixes were also used on the 45 singles. There are a few differences, however. The most obvious are on "Pleasant Valley Sunday", "Tapioca Tundra" and the title track, "Daydream Believer". In these cases, subtle yet significant alterations can be heard - evident mainly on the vocals, as they were usually cut long after the instrumental backing tracks. While its companion I'm a Believer & Other Hits remained in print for several years, Daydream Believer and Other Hits was removed from Flashback's catalog not long after it was released.

== Track listing ==
1. "Daydream Believer" (John Stewart) – 3:02
2. "D.W. Washburn" (Jerry Leiber, Mike Stoller) - 2:48
3. "Tapioca Tundra" (Michael Nesmith) - 3:07
4. "Words" (Tommy Boyce, Bobby Hart) - 2:51
5. "Pleasant Valley Sunday" (Gerry Goffin, Carole King) - 3:18
6. "Valleri" (Boyce, Hart) - 2:21
7. "It's Nice to Be with You" (Jerry Goldstein) - 2:55
8. "Good Clean Fun" (Nesmith) - 2:18
9. "Oh, My, My" (Jeff Barry, Andy Kim) - 3:02
10. "You Can't Tie a Mustang Down" (Barry, Leiber, Stoller) - 2:53
