= More Greatest Hits of The Monkees =

More Greatest Hits of the Monkees

Greatest hits album by the Monkees
- Released: 1982
- Recorded: 1966–1968
- Genre: Pop rock
- Label: Arista
- Producer: Various

The Monkees chronology
Monkeemania (40 Timeless Hits) (1979)	More Greatest Hits of the Monkees (1982)	Monkee Business (1982)

Professional ratings
Review scores
Source	Rating
Allmusic	3/5 stars

More Greatest Hits of the Monkees is a 1982 greatest hits compilation album of songs by the Monkees, assembled and released by Arista Records. Rather than featuring strictly hit singles, the collection also featured music from their television series, which was still airing in syndication around the US.

This album marks the compilation debut of chart hits "Words" and "The Girl I Knew Somewhere," which had been overlooked on the previous greatest hits albums ("Somewhere" had appeared on a compilation by the Laurie House publishers that was only available as a mail order, and the Australian compilation Monkeemania also included the song. This was the song's first U.S. release on an album available in record stores).

The 1988 CD reissue differs greatly from the original 1982 LP, each containing different mixes of some songs. Most notably, the CD features the U.S. stereo debut of "The Girl I Knew Somewhere," which had appeared on singles and other compilation LPs in mono or "Electronic Stereo" (U.K. pressings of the 1981 European Arista compilation The Monkees featured the stereo mix, although German mastered copies had the mono mix).

When Rhino Records reissued the entire Monkees catalog in 1995, this and all previous Monkees hits compilations were deleted.

== Track listing ==
1. "Take a Giant Step" (Gerry Goffin, Carole King) (true stereo on LP, mono on CD)
2. "Mary, Mary" (Michael Nesmith) (original 1967 stereo mix on LP, extended stereo mix on CD)
3. "Sometime in the Morning" (Goffin, King) (true stereo/single vocal on LP, mono/double-tracked vocal on CD)
4. "Cuddly Toy" (Harry Nilsson) (CD and LP feature same mix)
5. "Randy Scouse Git" (Micky Dolenz) (CD and LP feature same mix)
6. "Words" (Tommy Boyce, Bobby Hart) (CD and LP feature same mix)
7. "Valleri" (Boyce, Hart) (LP version fades out, CD version contains full ending)
8. "You Just May Be the One" (Nesmith) (CD and LP feature same mix)
9. "The Girl I Knew Somewhere" (Nesmith) ("Electronic Stereo" on LP, true stereo on CD)
10. "Saturday's Child" (David Gates) (true stereo on LP, mono on CD)
11. "Look Out (Here Comes Tomorrow)" (Neil Diamond) (CD and LP feature same mix)
12. "For Pete's Sake" (Peter Tork, Joseph Richards) (CD and LP feature same mix)
