= 2001: Live in Las Vegas =

Live album by the Monkees
- Released: 2001
- Recorded: March 2001
- Genre: Rock
- Producer: The Monkees

The Monkees chronology
Summer 1967: The Complete U.S. Concert Recordings (2001)	2001: Live in Las Vegas (2001)	The Best of The Monkees (2003)

Professional ratings
Review scores
Source	Rating
AllMusic	3/5 stars

2001: Live in Las Vegas (also known as Live Summer Tour) is a live album by the Monkees recorded during their "Monkeemania Returns Tour" (2001–2002). A companion DVD was released as well. The concert was recorded at the MGM Grand in Las Vegas, Nevada, in March 2001.

== Track listing ==
1. "Last Train to Clarksville"
2. "A Little Bit Me, a Little Bit You"
3. "Randy Scouse Git"
4. "Your Auntie Grizelda"
5. "Valleri"
6. "Goin' Down"
7. "Lucille"
8. "Oliver! Medley: Consider Yourself, I'd Do Anything, Who Will Buy?"
9. "Since I Fell for You"
10. "Is You Is or Is You Ain't My Baby?"
11. "(Your Love Keeps Lifting Me) Higher and Higher"
12. "Girl"
13. "Bach: Two Part Intervention in F"
14. "I'm a Believer"
15. "Papa's Gene's Blues"
16. "That Was Then, This Is Now"
17. "Porpoise Song"/"Listen to the Band"
18. "Daydream Believer"
19. "(I'm Not Your) Steppin' Stone"
20. "Pleasant Valley Sunday"

== Personnel ==
- Micky Dolenz: vocals, guitars, drums, timpani
- Davy Jones: vocals, guitars, percussion
- Peter Tork: vocals, guitars, keyboards, banjo
- Jerry Renino: musical director, bass guitar, vocals
- Dave Alexander: keyboards, vocals
- Wayne Avers: guitars, vocals
- Aviva Maloney: saxophones, flute, keyboards, vocals
- Sandy Gennaro: drums, percussion
- Eric Biondo: trumpet
- Sam Albright: saxophone
- Gregory Briggler: trombone
