= Christmas Spirit =

Christmas Spirit may refer to:

- Christmas Spirit (Donna Summer album), 1994
- Christmas Spirit (Richard Marx album), 2012
- The Christmas Spirit, a 1963 album by Johnny Cash
- The Christmas Spirit (film), 2013 American TV movie
- The Christmas Spirit (1914 film), a 1914 film by The Bison Film Company
- "The Christmas Spirit", an episode of The Ghosts of Motley Hall
- The Christmas Spirit (band), American band
