= Me & Magdalena =

Single by the Monkees

from the album Good Times!
- Released: May 20, 2016
- Recorded: February–March 2016
- Genre: Folk
- Length: 3:33
- Label: Rhino
- Songwriter: Ben Gibbard
- Producers: Adam Schlesinger, The Monkees, Jeff Barry

The Monkees singles chronology
"You Bring the Summer" (2016)	"Me & Magdalena" (2016)	"Unwrap You at Christmas" (2018)

Licensed audio
- "Me & Magdalena" on YouTube

"Me & Magdalena" is a song by the American pop rock band the Monkees, released as the third and final single from the band's 2016 album Good Times!.

== Background ==
When asked about the track, songwriter Benjamin Gibbard said via an email to National Public Radio:

Before The Beatles, before The Velvet Underground and before punk and/or indie rock, The Monkees were the first band I truly loved. Their albums were always on in our home when I was a kid, especially Pisces, Aquarius, Capricorn & Jones Ltd., and I learned to sing alongside them. I spent countless hours in front of the TV in the ’80s watching Monkees reruns, wishing I could climb through the screen and be in the show with them. They made being in a band seem so fun—and goddammit, it should be! For these reasons and a million others, I can say with absolutely zero hyperbole that contributing ‘Me & Magdalena’ to this album has been the greatest honor of my career.

— Benjamin Gibbard, via email to NPR

== Composition and lyrics ==
"Me & Magdalena" was written for the band by Ben Gibbard, the lead vocalist and guitarist for the band Death Cab for Cutie. The lyrics center around the singer's remembrance for a girl named Magdalena, who has seemingly passed away in the lyrics, as critic Jay McDowell wrote in an American Songwriter article: "I perceived it to be about a recently deceased woman and the song is being sung from the perspective of the surviving partner."

== Release and reception ==
"Me & Magdalena" was released on May 20, 2016, and was released to positive reviews such as critic Stephen Thomas Erlewine, wrote the song "taps into the burnished Americana of the group's late-'60s work". Writing for Ultimate Classic Rock, John Swanson wrote the song "features a world weary and slightly fragile lead vocal from Nesmith, which works to the song's benefit as Dolenz provides beautiful harmonies. Despite not charting in any countries, it has become a fan favorite Monkees track, currently standing at number 3 on their Spotify artist page. A live version of the track was included on the live album The Monkees Live: The Mike and Micky Show.

== Credits and personnel ==
Adapted from the liner notes of Good Times!:

The Monkees

- Michael Nesmith – vocals
- Micky Dolenz – vocals

Other personnel

- Mike Viola – guitar, bass
- Jody Porter – guitar
- Adam Schlesinger – piano, drums
