= I'm a Believer and Other Hits =

Greatest hits album by the Monkees
- Released: July 29, 1997
- Recorded: 1966–1987
- Genre: Rock, pop
- Length: 28:53
- Label: Rhino, Flashback
- Producer: Jeff Barry, Chip Douglas, Roger Bechirian, Bones Howe, Michael Nesmith, Tommy Boyce, Bobby Hart

The Monkees chronology
Justus (1996)	I'm a Believer and Other Hits (1997)	Daydream Believer and Other Hits (1998)

Professional ratings
Review scores
Source	Rating
Allmusic	2.5/5 stars

I'm a Believer and Other Hits is a budget-priced Monkees compilation released in 1997. It contains 10 of The Monkees' greatest hits. Many tracks are in their stereo single mixes; thus, "A Little Bit Me, A Little Bit You" is without handclaps, and "Listen to the Band" has a shorter organ bridge. The album includes one track from the 1980s reunion, along with one previously unreleased track "Ceiling in My Room", taken from The Birds, The Bees & The Monkees sessions.

== Track listing ==
1. "I'm a Believer" (Neil Diamond) - 2:47
2. "The Girl I Knew Somewhere" (Michael Nesmith) - 2:39
3. "Shades of Gray" (Barry Mann, Cynthia Weil) - 3:24 (Mis-credited to Goffin and King)
4. "Cuddly Toy" (Harry Nilsson) - 2:41 (Mis-credited to Boyce and Hart)
5. "A Little Bit Me, a Little Bit You" (Diamond) - 2:53
6. "Heart and Soul" (Simon Byrne, Andrew Howell) - 3:45
7. "Someday Man" (Roger Nichols, Paul Williams) - 2:41
8. "Ceiling in My Room" (Dominick DeMieri, Robert Dick, Davy Jones) - 3:13
9. "Listen to the Band" (Nesmith) - 2:29
10. "(I'm Not Your) Steppin' Stone" (Tommy Boyce, Bobby Hart) - 2:21
