= Christmas Party (The Monkees album) =

Studio album by the Monkees
- Released: October 12, 2018
- Recorded: May, July–September 2018; Unknown, 1991; November 22, 1967; October 1976
- Studios: Lucy's Meat Market (Los Angeles); Omelette Station (New York City); The Doghouse (Los Angeles); Beatland Tours (Atwater Village); Institute for the Musical Arts (Goshen)
- Genres: Pop rock, Christmas music
- Length: 37:48
- Label: Rhino
- Producers: Adam Schlesinger, Chip Douglas, Christian Nesmith, Jonathan Nesmith, Peter Tork, James Lee Stanley

The Monkees chronology
Good Times! (2016)	Christmas Party (2018)	The Mike and Micky Show (2020)

Singles from Christmas Party
- 1. "Unwrap You at Christmas" Released: 2018

Christmas Party is the thirteenth and final studio album by the American pop rock band the Monkees, released on October 12, 2018, by Rhino Records. Produced mainly by Adam Schlesinger (with Michael Nesmith's tracks produced by his sons Christian and Jonathan), the album is the Monkees' first to focus on Christmas themes. It follows on the success of their 2016 album Good Times!. The two-year gap is the shortest between albums since the 1969/1970 releases of The Monkees Present and Changes. The album features surviving Monkees Micky Dolenz, Mike Nesmith, and Peter Tork, as well as two posthumous contributions from Davy Jones.

The album features a mix of covers of earlier Christmas songs (from "Angels We Have Heard on High" and "Wonderful Christmastime" to the relatively obscure "Jesus Christ", originally by Big Star) and new holiday tunes written specifically for the album by several Good Times! contributors, including XTC's Andy Partridge, Weezer's Rivers Cuomo and Schlesinger. This is the only Monkees album on which there are no songs written by any member of the Monkees.

The Target store exclusive version features two additional tracks, "Riu Chiu" and "Christmas Is My Time of Year", vintage recordings from the group remastered and remixed by original Monkees producer Chip Douglas.

== Cover ==
The album cover was illustrated by comics artist Michael Allred. Allred, a lifetime Monkees fan, recalled: "I can't even remember doing it now. I was on a crazy high trying to squeeze everything I could into it."

== Reception ==
Professional ratings
Aggregate scores
Source	Rating
Metacritic	72/100
Review scores
Source	Rating
AllMusic	4/5 stars
The Arts Desk	3/5 stars
The Guardian	3/5 stars
Los Angeles Times	2.5/4 stars

Christmas Party received a mixed review in The Guardian, who described it as "a curious hodgepodge" and gave it three out of five stars. The same score was given by The Arts Desk who described it as "a mixed bag of covers and original songs and some of it is a bit cheesy". The Los Angeles Times gave the album two and a half out of four stars, stating "the big calling card may well be two vocals that Davy Jones recorded in 1991 and that are newly outfitted in fresh instrumental accompaniment pulled together by album producer Adam Schlesinger."

Variety did not rate the album, but described it as feeling "mostly like a Micky Dolenz solo album — co-produced by Fountains of Wayne’s Adam Schlesinger — that happens to have a few odd interjections from Michael Nesmith, Peter Tork and, yes, the late Davy Jones."

== Track listing ==
Standard edition
No.	Title	Writer(s)	Lead vocalist	Length
1.	"Unwrap You at Christmas"	Andy Partridge	Micky Dolenz	3:33
2.	"What Would Santa Do"	Rivers Cuomo	Dolenz	3:13
3.	"Mele Kalikimaka"	Robert Alexander Anderson	Davy Jones	2:26
4.	"House of Broken Gingerbread"	Adam Schlesinger; Michael Chabon	Dolenz	2:55
5.	"The Christmas Song"	Bob Wells; Mel Tormé	Michael Nesmith	3:41
6.	"Christmas Party (features audio sourced from The Monkees episode "The Christmas Show", filmed November 22, 1967)"	Peter Buck; Scott McCaughey	Dolenz	3:04
7.	"Jesus Christ"	Alex Chilton	Dolenz	2:37
8.	"I Wish It Could Be Christmas Every Day"	Roy Wood	Dolenz	3:31
9.	"Silver Bells"	Jay Livingston; Ray Evans	Jones	3:22
10.	"Wonderful Christmastime"	Paul McCartney	Dolenz	3:33
11.	"Snowfall"	Claude Thornhill; Ruth Thornhill	Nesmith	2:57
12.	"Angels We Have Heard on High"	Traditional; lyrics by James Chadwick	Peter Tork	2:49
13.	"Merry Christmas, Baby"	Lou Baxter; Johnny Moore	Dolenz	2:56

Target exclusive bonus tracks
No.	Title	Writer(s)	Lead vocalist	Length
14.	"Riu Chiu (audio sourced from The Monkees episode "The Christmas Show", filmed November 22, 1967)"	Mateo Flecha	Dolenz; Jones; Nesmith; Tork	1:30
15.	"Christmas Is My Time of Year"	Howard Kaylan; Chip Douglas	Jones; Dolenz	3:08

== Personnel ==
Credits adapted from Target exclusive CD liner notes.

The Monkees

- Micky Dolenz – lead vocals (1–2, 4, 6–8, 10, 13–15)
- Davy Jones – lead vocals (3, 9, 14–15)
- Michael Nesmith – lead vocals (5, 11, 14)
- Peter Tork – lead vocals (12, 14), banjo (12), Hammond B-3 organ (15)

Additional musicians

- Michael Eisenstein – electric guitars (1–4, 6–8, 13), acoustic guitar (6–8, 10), guitar (9)
- Adam Schlesinger – bass guitar (1–4, 6–10, 13), keyboards (1–2, 4, 7–8, 10, 13), guitar (1, 4), banjo (4), backing vocals (4), piano (7–8)
- Brian Young – drums (1–4, 6–10, 13), percussion (1–4, 6–10)
- David Mead – backing vocals (1–2, 4, 7–8, 10, 13)
- The Section Quartet (1, 9):
  - Daphne Chen – violin
  - Eric Gorfain – violin
  - Leah Katz – viola
  - Richard Dodd – cello
- Chip Douglas – ukulele (3), guitar (3, 15), bass guitar (15), vocals (15)
- Mike Swerdlow – steel guitar (3)
- Christian Nesmith – guitars (5), keyboards (5)
- Ian Walker – upright bass (5)
- Christopher Allis – drums (5)
- Pete Finney – pedal steel guitar (5)
- Circe Link – background vocals (5)
- Peter Buck – electric guitar (6–7), acoustic guitar (6)
- Jody Porter – electric guitar (6, 13)
- Scott McCaughey – electric guitar (6), acoustic guitar (6), backing vocals (6), piano (6), celeste (7)
- Jonathan Nesmith – all instruments (11), background vocals (11)
- James Lee Stanley – 6-string guitar (12), 12-string guitar (12), bass guitar (12)
- "Fast" Eddie Hoh – drums (15)
- Jeff Jones – guitars (15)
- Billy London – pedal steel guitar (15)
- Ollie Mitchell – piccolo trumpet (15)

Technical

- Adam Schlesinger – producer (1–4, 6–10, 12–13), mixing (1–4, 6–10, 12–13), engineer
- Chip Douglas – vocal production (3, 9), producer (3, 9, 15), vocal arrangement (14), brass arrangement (15)
- Daphne Chen – string arrangement (1, 9)
- Peter Tork – additional production (12), arranger (12)
- James Lee Stanley – additional production (12), arranger (12)
- Christian Nesmith – producer (5), mixing (5), vocal arrangement (5), engineer
- Jonathan Nesmith – producer (11), mixing (11), vocal arrangement (11), engineer
- Pete Min – engineer
- Andrew Sandoval – engineer
- Dan Piscina – engineer
- Andrew Schwartz – engineer
- Judy Elliot-Brown – engineer
- Ryan Smith – mastering
- John Hughes – executive producer
- Kris Perera – product manager
- Jonathan Lane – art direction, design
- Michael Allred – cover art

== Charts ==
Chart (2018)	Peak position
US Billboard Top Current Album Sales	60
US Billboard Holiday Album	3
