= Extended Versions (The Monkees album) =

Live album by The Monkees
- Released: November 28, 2003
- Length: 40:49
- Label: BMG Special Markets

The Monkees chronology
The Best of The Monkees (2003)	Extended Versions (2003)	The Monkees: Original Album Series (2009)

Professional ratings
Review scores
Source	Rating
Allmusic	2.5/5 stars

Extended Versions is a 2003 live album by the Monkees recorded during their 35th Anniversary Tour in 2001. It features three of the original Monkees; Micky Dolenz, Davy Jones and Peter Tork. The CD-only album includes live versions of several of the band's hit songs including "Last Train to Clarksville", "Daydream Believer", and "I'm a Believer".

The album was released through BMG Special Products, which is a division of BMG that uses a third-party to make compilation albums. Because there are no standards of quality for the subsidy, Extended Versions is considered a budget CD. The CD also does not contain liner notes.

== Track listing ==
No.	Title	Writer(s)	Lead vocal(s)	Length
1.	"Last Train to Clarksville"	Tommy Boyce, Bobby Hart	Micky Dolenz	4:07
2.	"Daydream Believer"	John Stewart	Davy Jones	3:21
3.	"I'm a Believer"	Neil Diamond	Dolenz	3:05
4.	"Mary, Mary"	Michael Nesmith	Dolenz, Jones & Peter Tork	3:02
5.	"(I'm Not Your) Steppin' Stone"	Boyce, Hart	Dolenz	2:51
6.	"Look Out (Here Comes Tomorrow)"	Diamond	Jones	1:58
7.	"Can You Dig It?"	Tork	Tork	2:15
8.	"Goin' Down"	Dolenz, Diane Hildebrand, Jones, Nesmith, Tork	Dolenz	2:58
9.	"It's Nice to Be with You"	Jerry Goldstein	Jones	3:28
10.	"Long Title: Do I Have to Do This All Over Again"	Tork	Tork	2:07
Total length:				40:49
