= Christmas Is My Time of Year =

Song written by Howard Kaylan and Chip Douglas

Single by The Christmas Spirit
- B-side: "Will You Still Believe in Me"
- Released: December 1968
- Length: 3:20
- Label: White Whale
- Songwriters: H. Kaylan; C. Douglas
- Producers: Chip Douglas; Howie Kaylan

"Christmas Is My Time of Year" is a Christmas single written by Howard Kaylan and Chip Douglas, both members of the Turtles.

== The Christmas Spirit ==
"Christmas Is My Time of Year" was first recorded and released on the Turtles' White Whale label in 1968 by the Christmas Spirit, a supergroup consisting of Kaylan and fellow Turtle Mark Volman; Gram Parsons and Gene Parsons of the Byrds; Linda Ronstadt; Modern Folk Quartet alumni Cyrus Faryar and Henry Diltz; and gospel singer Bessie Griffin. The song was compiled onto a 1984 collection of Christmas songs titled Rockin' Christmas: The 60's, 2004's Out of Nowhere: The White Whale Story, Volume 2, and All the Singles, a 2016 collection of singles by the Turtles.

The B-side, "Will You Still Believe in Me", was written by Bobby Kimmel of the Stone Poneys. It was also included in Out of Nowhere: The White Whale Story, Volume 2.

== We Three Monkees ==
"Christmas Is My Time of Year"

Single by The Monkees
- B-side: "White Christmas"
- Released: December 1976; September 1986 (remix)
- Length: 2:59; 3:05 (remix)
- Label: Christmas Records
- Songwriters: H. Kaylan; C. Douglas
- Producer: Chip Douglas

The Monkees singles chronology
"Do It in the Name of Love" (1971)	"Christmas Is My Time of Year" (1976)	"That Was Then, This Is Now" (1986)

In 1976, three members of the Monkees—Micky Dolenz, Davy Jones, and Peter Tork—reunited to record "Christmas Is My Time of Year". This version was produced by Chip Douglas, who had produced the Monkees' Headquarters and Pisces, Aquarius, Capricorn & Jones Ltd. albums, as well as their hit single "Daydream Believer". Though they did not obtain permission to record as "The Monkees", a promotional flyer identified the group as "We Three Monkees ... Davy Jones, Micky Dolenz and Peter Tork".

This single was a vanity pressing on the Christmas Records label. It was offered to members of the Monkees Fan Club by mail order, but it may also have had some retail release. The B-side is a Davy Jones-sung version of "White Christmas" also produced by Douglas.

Both sides of the record were remixed in 1986 and reissued during Monkees conventions. The remixed version of "Christmas Is My Time of Year" appeared on the 1988 compilation Cool Yule, Volume 2 and as a bonus track on the Monkees' Christmas Party album sold by Target. The 1976 version was released as part of the Christmas Party Plus double single, for the 2019 Record Store Day event.

=== Personnel ===
Credits sourced from Monkees Live Almanac.

The Monkees

- Micky Dolenz – lead vocals
- Davy Jones – lead vocals
- Peter Tork – Hammond organ

Additional personnel

- Chip Douglas – guitar, bass, producer
- Eddie Hoh – drums
- Unknown musicians – horns
