= Good Times! =

Studio album by the Monkees
- Released: May 27, 2016
- Recorded: January 21 and February 4, 5, 1967; January 10 and March 9, 1968; August 5, 1969; February–March 2016
- Studios: Lucy's Meat Market (Los Angeles); Omelette Station (New York City); The Pool (North Hollywood); RCA (Hollywood); RCA B (New York City)
- Genre: Pop rock
- Length: 36:47
- Label: Rhino
- Producers: Adam Schlesinger, The Monkees, Jeff Barry

The Monkees chronology
Monkeemania (The Very Best of the Monkees) (2011)	Good Times! (2016)	Christmas Party (2018)

Singles from Good Times
- 1. "She Makes Me Laugh" Released: April 28, 2016; 2. "You Bring the Summer" Released: May 2, 2016; 3. "Me & Magdalena" Released: May 20, 2016

Good Times! is the twelfth studio album by the American pop rock band the Monkees, released in 2016 by Rhino Records. Produced primarily by Adam Schlesinger, the album was recorded to commemorate the band's 50th anniversary. It was the first Monkees studio album since Justus (1996) – their longest gap between releases – and the first since the death of band member Davy Jones. The album features surviving Monkees Micky Dolenz, Michael Nesmith, and Peter Tork, as well as a posthumous contribution from Jones.

Good Times! received generally positive reviews from music critics and reached number 14 on the Billboard 200, becoming the band's highest-charting album in 48 years.

== Background and recording ==
The project was initiated by Rhino executives John Hughes and Mark Pinkus, who wanted the Monkees to record a new album for the band's 50th anniversary. The album, the band's first since Justus (1996), was produced by Adam Schlesinger of Fountains of Wayne and features surviving Monkees Micky Dolenz, Michael Nesmith and Peter Tork.

The album features one composition or co-write from each Monkee, as well as older material penned by writers long associated with the band (Harry Nilsson, Neil Diamond, Tommy Boyce & Bobby Hart, Gerry Goffin & Carole King and Jeff Barry & Joey Levine), alongside new songs by Schlesinger, Andy Partridge, Rivers Cuomo, Ben Gibbard, Noel Gallagher and Paul Weller. Schlesinger had asked his Fountains of Wayne bandmate Jody Porter to write a song for the album, but it was not used because it was too similar to the title track.

The title track is a composition by Nilsson, first attempted in a session in January 1968, and the album version features new vocals by Dolenz singing a posthumous "duet" with Nilsson, who had performed a guide vocal in the original session. Monkee Davy Jones is represented posthumously by the Diamond-penned track "Love to Love", which was recorded in 1967 in a Don Kirshner-supervised session while the group was trying to gain musical independence from Kirshner. In August 1969, Brendan Cahill supervised a new double-tracked lead vocal by Jones, but the song remained unfinished and did not see an official release until a poor quality copy was issued on the 1979 compilation album Monkeemania. The 1969 version appears on Good Times!, with new backing vocals by Dolenz and Tork.

Dolenz was uncomfortable with some of Cuomo's original lyrics in "She Makes Me Laugh", and Cuomo "added in new lyrics about Scrabble and a canoe trip when Dolenz felt the original draft was geared towards a man much younger than his 71 years." The lyric "directing traffic in the mall" was improvised by Dolenz.

In addition to Monkees band members Dolenz (vocals, drums), Nesmith (vocals, guitar) and Tork (vocals, keyboards, banjo), guest musicians include Fountains of Wayne members Schlesinger (guitar, bass, keyboards, drums, percussion), Porter (guitar) and Brian Young (drums, percussion), as well as Mike Viola (guitar, bass, background vocals).

== Promotion ==
The first single from the album was the Cuomo-penned "She Makes Me Laugh", released on April 28, 2016, along with a lyric video. The second single was Partridge's composition "You Bring the Summer", released on May 2. The third and final single was Gibbard's "Me & Magdalena", released on May 19. Dolenz and Tork embarked on a 50th anniversary tour to promote the album, including nearly 50 dates in North America.

== Reception ==
Professional ratings
Aggregate scores
Source	Rating
AnyDecentMusic?	7.3/10
Metacritic	79/100
Review scores
Source	Rating
AllMusic	4/5 stars
ABC News	4/5 stars
The Evening Standard	3/5 stars
The Independent	4/5 stars
The Irish Times	3/5 stars
Mojo Magazine	4/5 stars
Record Collector	4/5 stars
Rolling Stone	3.5/5 stars
Rolling Stone Australia	4/4 stars
The Times	3/5 stars

The Independent gave the album a 4 out of 5 review, declaring that Good Times! was "probably The Monkees' best album, after their hits compilation", while The New York Times summed up the release with "Fifty years later, the Monkees are still endearing." The Herald-Standard concluded that "If indeed this latest album serves as the group's swan song, then it is a joyous finale." Mojo gave the album four stars and declared it their album of the week, while Record Collector stated "to everyone's considerable relief and delight, they've pulled it off. They really have," and gave the album four stars.

The album was awarded 3.5 out of 5 by Rolling Stone, who concluded, "Monkees freaks have waited far too long for this album. But it was worth it." The magazine's Australian edition gave it full marks and noted "Producer Adam Schlesinger of Fountains Of Wayne knows a thing or five about classic pop, and although Good Times! is a Frankenstein's monster of something old, something new and something in between, he manages to orchestrate the whole thing into something beyond an embarrassing heritage act."

Ultimate Classic Rock declared that "The fact that there is a new Monkees album in 2016 is miraculous enough, but that said album, Good Times!, is nothing short of a masterpiece is astounding." RTÉ stated, "keeping it analogue and raw, Good Times! is a joy. This is one band reunion that doesn't besmirch the legacy and even offers something new and fresh." However, it bemoaned the fact that "Noel Gallagher teams up with Paul Weller to dash off 'Birth Of An Accidental Hipster', another droll sub-Kinks ditty but it sounds bloated compared to the effervescence of what's gone before." ABC News concluded that "This is mandatory listening for any Monkees fan." Stephen Thomas Erlewine of AllMusic gave the album 4 out of 5 stars, stating the album is "a joyous revival of the cheerful jangle that characterized the group's big '60s hits."

Will Hodgkinson of The Times gave the album 3 out of 5, and the Evening Standard gave the album three stars, declaring that the album "doesn't quite work as it's let down by a flat production and the lack of anything approaching their more magical moments. For all that, though, it's no disgrace".

Tony Clayton-Lea of The Irish Times noted that "Songs by Death Cab for Cutie songwriter Ben Gibbard ("Me & Magdalena"), XTC's Andy Partridge ("You Bring The Summer"), and Noel Gallagher/Paul Weller ("Birth of an Accidental Hipster") brilliantly reference the band's 1960s glory days, but as a cohesive project it's more unpleasant valley Sunday than anything else."

At Metacritic, the album has a metascore of 79, indicating generally favorable reviews. Its user score is 8.7, indicating universal acclaim.

The album is the highest charting Monkees album in the US since The Birds, The Bees & The Monkees in 1968 and the highest charting in the UK since Pisces, Aquarius, Capricorn & Jones Ltd. in 1967.

=== Accolades ===
Publication	Accolade	Year	Rank
Mojo	The 50 Best Albums of 2016	2016	30
AllMusic	Favorite Rock Albums of 2016	2016	Top 44

== Track listing ==
No.	Title	Writer(s)	Lead vocalist	Length
1.	"Good Times" (with Harry Nilsson)	Harry Nilsson	Micky Dolenz and Harry Nilsson	2:46
2.	"You Bring the Summer"	Andy Partridge	Dolenz	3:00
3.	"She Makes Me Laugh"	Rivers Cuomo	Dolenz	3:00
4.	"Our Own World"	Adam Schlesinger	Dolenz	2:45
5.	"Gotta Give It Time"	Jeff Barry, Joey Levine	Dolenz	2:17
6.	"Me & Magdalena"	Ben Gibbard	Michael Nesmith with Dolenz	3:33
7.	"Whatever's Right"	Tommy Boyce, Bobby Hart	Dolenz	2:00
8.	"Love to Love"	Neil Diamond	Davy Jones	2:29
9.	"Little Girl"	Peter Tork	Tork	2:42
10.	"Birth of an Accidental Hipster"	Noel Gallagher, Paul Weller	Nesmith and Dolenz	3:31
11.	"Wasn't Born to Follow"	Gerry Goffin, Carole King	Tork	2:53
12.	"I Know What I Know"	Michael Nesmith	Nesmith	3:30
13.	"I Was There (And I'm Told I Had a Good Time)"	Micky Dolenz, Schlesinger	Dolenz	2:15

== Bonus Tracks and Good Times! Plus! ==
Four bonus tracks were included in part on different retail versions of the album :

- "Me & Magdalena (Version 2)" (Benjamin Gibbard)
- "Terrifying" (Zach Rogue)
- "A Better World" (Nick Thorkelson)
- "Love's What I Want" (Andy Partridge)

All four bonus tracks were issued in a 2016 Record Day exclusive ten inch EP entitled Good Times! Plus!.

== Personnel ==
Credits adapted from CD liner notes.

The Monkees

- Micky Dolenz – lead vocal (2–5, 7, 13), harmony vocals (6), backing vocals (8), co-lead vocals (1, 10), drums (13)
- Davy Jones – lead vocal (8)
- Michael Nesmith – backing vocals (2–5, 7), guitar (1–3), lead vocal (6, 12), co-lead vocals (10)
- Peter Tork – backing vocals (2–4, 8), organ (2), banjo (3, 11), keyboards (4, 7), lead vocal (9, 11), acoustic guitar (9)

Additional musicians

- Harry Nilsson – co-lead vocal (1), piano (1)
- Adam Schlesinger – guitar (1, 4, 12), bass guitar (2–4, 7, 9, 10, 12, 13), keyboards (2, 4), piano (6, 10, 12, 13), drums (6), percussion (10), Chamberlin (12)
- Rick Dey – bass guitar (1)
- Eddie Hoh – drums (1)
- Mike Viola – guitar (2, 3, 6, 7, 9, 10, 13), bass guitar (6), backing vocals (9)
- Pete Min – guitar (2)
- Jody Porter – guitar (2, 6)
- Brian Young – drums (2–4, 7, 9, 10), percussion (2–4)
- Al Gorgoni – guitar (5, 8)
- Don Thomas – guitar (5, 8)
- Hugh McCracken – guitar (5, 8)
- Lou Mauro – bass guitar (5, 8)
- Artie Butler – organ (5, 8)
- Herb Lovelle – drums (5, 8)
- Tom Cerone – tambourine (5, 8)
- Coco Dolenz – backing vocals (7, 10)
- Bobby Hart – backing vocals (7), organ (7)
- Stan Free – clavinet (8)
- Mike Deasy – guitar (11)
- Dennis Budimir – guitar (11)
- Al Casey – guitar (11)
- Max Bennett – bass guitar (11)
- Michael Melvoin – harpsichord (11)
- Earl Palmer – drums (11)
- Stan Levey – percussion (11)
- Milt Holland – vibes (11)

Technical

- Adam Schlesinger – producer, mixing, engineer
- Pete Min – engineer
- Dan Piscina – additional engineering
- Christian Nesmith – additional engineering
- The Monkees – producers (1, 11)
- Pete Abbott – engineer (1, 11)
- Jeff Barry – producer (5, 8), arrangements (5, 8)
- Ray Hall – engineer (5, 8)
- Ryan Smith – mastering
- Rory Wilson – art direction, design
- Jonathan Lane – cover art
- Henry Diltz – photos
- Andrew Sandoval – Davy Jones photo

== Charts ==
Chart (2016)	Peak position
Australian Albums (ARIA)	20
Belgian Albums (Ultratop Flanders)	83
Belgian Albums (Ultratop Wallonia)	167
Canadian Albums (Billboard)	95
Irish Albums (IRMA)	58
Japanese Albums (Oricon)	130
New Zealand Heatseekers Albums (RMNZ)	10
Scottish Albums (Official Charts)	24
Swiss Albums (Schweizer Hitparade)	57
UK Albums (Official Charts)	29
US Billboard 200	14
US Billboard Vinyl Albums	1
