= Tapioca Tundra =

1968 single by the Monkees

Single by The Monkees

from the album The Birds, the Bees and the Monkees
- A-side: "Valleri"
- Released: February 16, 1968
- Recorded: November 11, 1967
- Studio: RCA Victor Studios, Hollywood, CA
- Genre: Rock; psychedelic rock
- Length: 3:03
- Label: Colgems
- Songwriter: Michael Nesmith
- Producer: The Monkees

The Monkees singles chronology
"Daydream Believer" (1967)	"Valleri" / "Tapioca Tundra" (1968)	"D. W. Washburn" (1968)

Official audio
- "Tapioca Tundra" on YouTube

"Tapioca Tundra" is a 1968 song written by Michael Nesmith and originally performed by the Monkees.

== Lyrics ==
The lyrics of "Tapioca Tundra" poetically describe how a writer of poetry or prose loses control of a work's meaning and impact once consumed by its audience. Michael Nesmith described his songwriting style for "Tapioca Tundra" as poetry set to music. "One of the ways I got into songwriting was to find poems by great poets and see if I could put them to music," he said in an interview. "At the time that 'Tapioca Tundra' and 'Daily Nightly' came along, I had been writing my own poetry for a while. ... They weren't really designed as songs at all."

A handwritten early version of the poem on which the lyrics were based was printed in the July 1967 issue of Tiger Beat magazine, for which Nesmith served as guest editor.

== The Monkees ==
Released as the B-side of "Valleri", "Tapioca Tundra" was the first of the Monkees' singles to feature a lead vocal by Nesmith and it was his biggest hit as a songwriter for the Monkees. The song also appeared on the Monkees' fifth studio album, The Birds, the Bees & the Monkees. Despite being a B-side, it was a top 40 hit in the United States, reaching #34 on the Billboard Hot 100 chart. It also shared the #1 position with its A-side for one week in April on Canada's RPM chart.

=== Charts ===
Country	Chart (1968)	Peak position
US	Billboard Hot 100	34
US	Cashbox	47
US	Record World	38
Canada	The RPM 100	1^{A}
Canada	CHUM Hit Parade	5^{A}

A: Chart position shared with A-side "Valleri".

== Other versions ==
Later in 1968, an instrumental version of "Tapioca Tundra" appeared as the B-side of "Don't Cry Now" by Michael Nesmith's side project, the Wichita Train Whistle. Both sides of the single appeared on the album The Wichita Train Whistle Sings. The Wichita Train Whistle project was an attempt by Nesmith at orchestral arrangements of his compositions with a large group of session musicians, with the help of arranger Shorty Rogers, in the vein of other composer-arrangers such as Henry Mancini.

In 1971 Nesmith re-recorded the song with the First National Band, though vocals were never finished for the track. The instrumental was released on Different Drum: The Lost RCA Victor Recordings in 2021.

Japanese jazz drummer Takeuchi Wasaburō teamed with Tokyo College of Music vocal group School Mates on a 1969 album of Monkees cover songs, a majority of them from The Birds, the Bees & the Monkees, including "Tapioca Tundra".

== Reception and legacy ==
Billboard magazine described the song as "a driving swinger with a clever megaphoned vocal workout and old-timey feel" in its "Top 20 Pop Spotlight" feature.

An acoustic demo of "Tapioca Tundra" recorded in 1967 was used in the sixth-season episode of Better Call Saul, "Breaking Bad". The episode's writer-director Thomas Schnauz told TV Guide he thought the lyric, "It cannot be a part of me, for now it's part of you", fit well with Saul Goodman's character arc, saying, "It fits so well with ... 'I'm not that person anymore. It's part of this person.' It just feels like it works so well with the emotion that he's going through."

== See also ==
- The Monkees discography
