= D. W. Washburn =

- US picture sleeve

Single by the Monkees
- B-side: "It's Nice to Be with You"
- Released: June 8, 1968
- Recorded: February 17 and March 1, 1968; RCA Victor Studios, Hollywood, California, United States
- Genre: Vaudeville; pop rock
- Length: 2:46
- Label: Colgems
- Songwriters: Jerry Leiber; Mike Stoller
- Producer: The Monkees

The Monkees singles chronology
"Valleri" (1968)	"D. W. Washburn" (1968)	"Porpoise Song" (1968)

"D. W. Washburn" is a song written by Jerry Leiber and Mike Stoller, recorded by both the Coasters and the Monkees. It was also included in the musical Smokey Joe's Cafe.

The Monkees' version was released as a non-album single and was a double-sided hit, backed with another non-album track, "It's Nice to Be with You". The music was arranged and conducted by Shorty Rogers.

== Lyrics ==
The lyrics tell a story of a derelict (Washburn) who is chosen by a well-meaning charity to be cleaned up and fed a meal. Washburn declines the offer, preferring his jobless and drunken but easygoing lifestyle to a life of responsibility. He mentions, "I do believe I got it made."

== Recordings ==
Recorded during the sessions for The Birds, the Bees & the Monkees, the Monkees' version of "D. W. Washburn" was the first single that they released after the second and final season of their NBC television series had concluded. All of their previous singles had reached the top three positions on the Billboard Top 100 because of heavy promotion during episodes of the television show; without this exposure, "D. W. Washburn" became the band's first to miss the top ten in the U.S., reaching No. 19. It was also their last American Top 40 single until "That Was Then, This Is Now" in 1986.

Colgems Records president Lester Sill later regretted his decision to release the song as the followup to "Valleri", saying: "I loved the sound of the song. I loved the sound of the demo that I heard. Then I realized after we did it and it came out that it was really a downer. It was a story about a guy in the gutter, about a bum. I thought that there was kind of a comical, Dixieland feel to it that I felt was rather different. In hindsight, I realized it was an awful mistake."

Peter Tork said: "Originally, there was a black bass singer on the take. Bert Schneider said, 'Wait a minute! It's one thing to have Tommy (Boyce) and Bobby (Hart) singing 'ohhs' and 'ahhs' in the background; it's another to have a prominent black bass singer responding that way.' The only thing about that song that was noticeable was that it's Leiber-Stoller. I imagine it was an old Leiber-Stoller tune from way, way back that nobody had done yet. It sounds like middle Coasters, you know. The thing about the Monkees project at the end was, I think basically Bert and Bob (Rafelson) were running out of steam. That's what I think. I think for some reason, somehow, they had had it. They started off with a lot of enthusiasm, and I think the pressures brought them down. I think Bert's still reeling, to tell you the truth." The original version with the black bass singer was released on The Birds, The Bees & The Monkees box set in 2010.

The Monkees performed the song on their 1968 Australasia tour and continued to perform the song during their 1980s and later reunions, including a performance on Nashville Now, a country music showcase.

== "It's Nice to Be with You" ==
Also recorded during the sessions for The Birds, the Bees & the Monkees was the B-side "It's Nice to Be with You". Written by Jerry Goldstein, it also charted in the U.S., reaching No. 51 on the Billboard Hot 100 and No. 26 on the Cash Box chart. Its greatest success occurred in Canada, where it reached No. 15.

== Personnel ==
Credits adapted from Rhino Handmade 2010 deluxe edition box set.

The Monkees

- Micky Dolenz - lead vocals

Additional musicians

- Henry Diltz - banjo
- Keith Allison - guitar
- Bill Chadwick - guitar
- Michel Rubini - tack piano
- Chip Douglas - bass guitar
- Jim Gordon - drums
- Larry Bunker - mallets
- Carroll "Cappy" Lewis - trumpet
- Stu Williamson - trumpet
- Lou Blackburn - trombone
- Herbie Harper - trombone
- Bill Hood - saxophone
- Unknown - backing vocals

== Chart performance ==
Chart performance for "D.W. Washburn"
Chart (1968)	Peak position
Australia (Go-Set)	11
Australia (Kent Music Report)	10
Canada (The RPM 100)	2
UK Singles (Official Charts)	17
US Billboard Hot 100	19
US Cashbox Top 100	10

== Other versions ==
The Coasters recorded a version of the song in October 1967, which was released following the Monkees' version in July 1968 by Date Records. Cash Box wrote, "Song is different enough to put the song on the charts again". The single's B-side was "Everybody's Woman".

A medley of "D. W. Washburn" and "L. David Sloane (A Good Man Is Hard to Find)" was recorded by the Hutch Davie Calliope Band. The single was produced by Bob Crewe. The song reached number 37 on the Cash Box Looking Ahead survey on September 14, 1968, although no artist was listed.
