= Listen to the Band (song) =

- US single cover reprint

Single by The Monkees

from the album The Monkees Present
- B-side: "Someday Man"
- Released: April 15, 1969
- Recorded: June 1-December 28, 1968
- Studio: RCA Studio B, Nashville; RCA, Hollywood; Gold Star Studios, Hollywood
- Genre: Country rock; country soul
- Length: 2:45 (album); 2:28 (single)
- Label: Colgems
- Songwriter: Michael Nesmith
- Producer: Michael Nesmith

The Monkees singles chronology
"Tear Drop City" (1969)	"Listen to the Band" (1969)	"Good Clean Fun" (1969)

"Listen to the Band" is a song by American pop rock band the Monkees, released as a single on April 15, 1969. Written by Michael Nesmith, it is the first time Nesmith sang lead vocals on a Monkees single A-side.

== Background ==
The song was recorded during Nesmith's RCA Nashville sessions. The basic track was recorded on June 1, 1968 at RCA Studio B in Nashville, Tennessee under the working title "Bonnie Jean And The Psychedelic Car". Additional instrumental overdubs were added the following day. The song was mixed on October 29. On December 9, Shorty Rogers added a brass arrangement to the track at RCA in Hollywood. Andrew Sandoval noted the inclusion of unconfirmed additional instruments in the session documents. On December 28, Nesmith continued unspecified work on the song at Gold Star Studios.

== Composition ==
The song includes a long-held cadenza on the electric guitar that rises from G to the key of C with the accompaniment of the organ before Nesmith repeats the spoken title of the song to "Listen to the Band". The song features a brass section that plays during the instrumental section as if the brass were the band. The song ends with the recorded sound of an audience cheering for the band, sourced from the album 144 Genuine Sound Effects on the Mercury Hill label. Nesmith later revealed that the chord progression of "Listen to the Band" was created by playing another song he wrote, "Nine Times Blue", backwards.

== Release ==
"Listen to the Band" was first heard in a live performance on the Monkees' television special 33 1/3 Revolutions Per Monkee. The one-hour special aired on NBC on April 14, 1969, and the single was released the next day. On April 24, The Monkees performed "Someday Man" in a medley with "I'm a Believer", and later, "Listen to the Band" on The Joey Bishop Show.

The single's flip side, "Someday Man", was a song written by Paul Williams and Roger Nichols and produced by Bones Howe. It was sung by Jones and recorded on November 8, 1968 at the same time as Goffin and King's "A Man Without a Dream", which had previously appeared on the Monkees' album Instant Replay. Final mixing occurred the following January. "Someday Man" was heavily promoted in trade ads and was designated as the "plug side" on the promotional single, peaking at number 81 on the Billboard Hot 100. However, DJs began to prefer the B-side, and Colgems accordingly began making updated picture sleeves, with "Listen to the Band" now listed as the A-side. The song reached number 63 on the Billboard charts. Until the Monkees' final album Changes, it was the only song released by the group that was not published by Screen Gems-Columbia Music, but rather Irving Almo Music. Bones Howe recollects, “They had always recorded songs either from Screen Gems, or they recorded their own material. We were able to convince Colgems that we could do an outside song. I guess it was because we looked around, and kept saying to them, ‘Find me another song that’ll knock this one out of the box.’ No one could find a song that everybody liked better.”

"Listen to the Band" was later included on the Monkees' album The Monkees Present, released in October 1969. The album version has a longer instrumental break. The song was edited into the soundtrack of The Monkees episode "Monkees Vs. Machine" when the show aired in Saturday morning reruns.

In 1991, the song was remixed for the Listen to the Band CD box set. The October 1968 mix was released as a bonus track on the Rhino CD of The Monkees Present.

== Personnel ==
Credits adapted from Rhino Handmade 2013 "Deluxe Edition" box set.

The Monkees

- Michael Nesmith - lead vocals, electric guitar

Additional musicians

- Lloyd Green – steel guitar
- Wayne Moss – guitar
- Mike Saluzzi – guitar
- Charlie McCoy – harmonica
- Bobby Thompson – banjo
- Michel Rubini – keyboards
- David Briggs – piano
- Norbert Putnam – bass guitar
- Jerry Carrigan – drums
- Don McGinnis – brass
- Bud Brisbois – trumpet
- Buddy Childers – trumpet
- Ray Triscari – trumpet
- Dick Nash – trombone
- John Kitzmiller – tuba

Unconfirmed personnel and duties

- Harold Bradley or Billy Sanford – additional guitar
- Percussion

== Chart performance ==
Chart performance for "Listen to the Band"
Chart (1969)	Peak position
Australia (Go-Set)	8
Canada (The RPM 100)	53
US Billboard Hot 100	63
US Cashbox Top 100	57

Chart performance for "Someday Man"
Chart (1969)	Peak position
UK Singles (Official Charts)	47
US Billboard Hot 100	81
US Cashbox Top 100	80

== Other versions ==
In 1970, Nesmith re-recorded the song with The First National Band for their second album, Loose Salute. On May 1, the group recorded the song at RCA in Hollywood, California, which went unreleased. On May 27, Nesmith and the group remade the track, and added overdubs on July 16, which was the version that appeared on the album. An additional, alternate version was included in the 2000 Expanded Edition of Nesmith's 1972 album Tantamount to Treason Vol. 1.
