= Randy Scouse Git =

Single by the Monkees

from the album Headquarters
- B-side: "Forget That Girl"
- Released: May 22, 1967
- Recorded: March 4 and 8, 1967
- Studio: RCA Victor Studio C, Hollywood
- Genre: Experimental pop; vaudeville
- Length: 2:40
- Label: RCA
- Songwriter: Micky Dolenz
- Producer: Douglas Farthing-Hatlelid

"Randy Scouse Git" is a song written by Micky Dolenz in 1967 and recorded by the Monkees. It was the first song written by Dolenz to be commercially released, and it became a number 2 hit in the UK, where it was retitled "Alternate Title" after the record company (RCA) complained that the original title was actually somewhat "rude to British audiences" and requested that the Monkees supply an alternate title. Dolenz took the song's title from a phrase he had heard spoken on an episode of the British television series Till Death Us Do Part, which he had watched while in England. The song also appeared on The Monkees TV series, on their album Headquarters, and on several "Greatest Hits" albums. Peter Tork said that it was one of his favorite Monkees tracks.

== Background ==
In July 1967, Micky Dolenz, Peter Tork and Michael Nesmith were in London and the Beatles threw a party for the Monkees in London. According to Dolenz, the song was written about this party held at the Speakeasy nightclub. There are references in the song to the Beatles ("the four kings of EMI") and to other party attendees such as Cass Elliot of the Mamas & the Papas ("the girl in yellow dress"), and Dolenz's future wife Top of the Pops "disc girl" Samantha Juste ("She's a wonderful lady", "the being known as Wonder Girl"). The verses and chorus do not relate to each other, with the verses whimsically describing the party and the chorus consisting of abuse being hurled at the narrator. As Nesmith told Melody Maker in 1997, "The old establishment was going, 'Why don't you cut your hair,' and 'Alternate Title' was a rail against that."

The song's title, "Randy Scouse Git", translates to American English as "sex-crazed Liverpudlian jerk", according to Dolenz. The phrase was taken from the 1960s British sitcom Till Death Us Do Part, in which it was regularly used by the loud-mouthed main character Alf Garnett, played by Cockney actor Warren Mitchell, to insult his Liverpudlian ("Scouse") son-in-law, played by Tony Booth. The show was later adapted into the American sitcom All in the Family, in which the writers replaced the phrase in American scripts with the epithet "Meathead". RCA Records in England told the band that they would not release the song unless it was given an "alternate title". By his own account, Dolenz said "OK, 'Alternate Title' it is".

The song was performed by all four Monkees, with Dolenz on vocals, drums and timpani, Davy Jones on backing vocals, Mike Nesmith on guitar, Peter Tork on piano and organ, and producer Chip Douglas (The Turtles) on bass guitar.

Dolenz reprises lyrics from the song in "Love's What I Want", a bonus track to the 2016 Monkees album Good Times! ("Why don't you be like me? Why don't you stop and see? Why don't you hate who I hate, kill who I kill, to be free?").

== Personnel ==
Credits adapted from 2022 Rhino "Super Deluxe Edition" box set.

The Monkees

- Micky Dolenz – drums, lead vocals, tympani, woodblock
- Michael Nesmith – electric 12-string guitar
- Peter Tork – backing vocals, organ, piano
- Davy Jones – backing vocals

Additional musician

- Chip Douglas – bass guitar

Technical

- Chip Douglas (as Douglas Farthing Hatlelid) – producer
- Hank Cicalo – engineer

== Charts ==
Chart (1967)	Peak position
Australia (Go-Set)	9
Austria (Ö3 Austria Top 40)	14
Belgium (Ultratop 50 Flanders)	11
Belgium (Ultratop 50 Wallonia)	25
Finland (Soumen Virallinen)	34
Germany (GfK)	11
Ireland (IRMA)	4
Netherlands (Single Top 100)	18
New Zealand (Listener Chart)	5
Norway (VG-lista)	2
UK Singles (Official Charts)	2
