= Valleri =

- US single label

Single by the Monkees

from the album The Birds, The Bees & The Monkees
- B-side: "Tapioca Tundra"
- Released: February 17, 1968
- Recorded: December 26 and 28, 1967
- Studio: United Recorders (Los Angeles)
- Genre: Psychedelic rock
- Length: 2:16
- Label: Colgems
- Songwriter: Tommy Boyce and Bobby Hart
- Producer: The Monkees

The Monkees singles chronology
"Daydream Believer" (1967)	"Valleri" (1968)	"D. W. Washburn" (1968)

"Valleri" is a song written by Tommy Boyce and Bobby Hart for the Monkees. The single peaked at number three on the Billboard Hot 100 and reached number one on the Cash Box chart and in Canada.

== Background ==
Screen Gems president and music supervisor Don Kirshner asked Tommy Boyce and Bobby Hart if they had any "girl's-name" songs to be used in the Monkees television series. After claiming that they had a finished song, Boyce and Hart improvised "Valleri" on their way to Kirshner's office. Kirshner was pleased with their work, and "Valleri" was recorded with Boyce and Hart producing the original sessions in August 1966.

The original recording included instrumental backing by the Candy Store Prophets. Wrecking Crew session musician Louie Shelton contributed a flamenco-style guitar solo consisting of hammer-ons and pull-offs. The song was featured in the television show's first season in 1967; a staged performance showed Michael Nesmith apparently picking Shelton's guitar solo via cuts between Nesmith with his hands obscured and close-ups of hands playing the solo. While the first version of "Valleri" went unreleased, a few off-air recordings received radio airplay when some DJs recorded the song from the television and later surfaced on bootleg recordings.

By late 1967, Colgems was looking for a follow up single to the group's "Daydream Believer". Lester Sill reportedly told Bobby Hart, "We all know that ‘Valleri’ is a smash, and I need a hit single bad." According to Hart, the original 1966 track could not be used because union contracts had already been filed with Boyce and Hart listed as producers, and the Monkees' contracts stipulated that all future recordings would show "Produced by the Monkees" on the label. Boyce and Hart were approached about coming back to produce a new version of the track. Hart said: "[Colgems president] Lester Sill came back to us and said, 'They want you to recut Valleri. You can't have producers credit, but we want you to go back in and do it again, making it sound as close to the original as possible.'" The new recording was produced by Boyce and Hart on December 26, 1967.

When Sill heard the track, he felt it that needed something more, and had a brass section overdubbed on December 28.

The song consists mainly of four chords (F♯ major, E major, A major and C♯ major), and the bridge introduces some harmonic variety (from F♯ major to D♯ minor, twice).

== Release ==
The remade "Valleri" was released on February 17, 1968. In the United States, the song reached number 3 on the Billboard Hot 100 and topped the Cash Box singles chart. The single was the band's last American Top Ten hit, their last to receive a push from their television series, and their last to be certified gold by the RIAA. The song was featured on the band's fifth album, The Birds, The Bees & The Monkees, released in April 1968.

The original recording of "Valleri" was finally released in January 1990 as part of the Rhino Records collection Missing Links, Volume II, along with several other versions of songs used in the TV series.

Single and LP releases of the second version, as well versions appearing on subsequent packages, feature a fadeout ending. The cold-ending version (heard in one episode of the television series and credited as "Valerie") was first released on Arista's Then & Now... The Best of the Monkees compilation in 1986. Subsequent hits packages and reissues of the single on the Flashback label also feature the longer version. Early examples of the Flashback single release have the fadeout ending.

== Live history ==
The song's regular live performances first occurred when Davy Jones and Micky Dolenz paired with songwriters Boyce and Hart in 1976 performing "Valleri" as Dolenz, Jones, Boyce & Hart as part of a medley in more than 50 concert dates. When Jones, Dolenz and Peter Tork reunited in 1986 to tour as The Monkees, they frequently featured "Valleri" in their set lists. The song was played in over 100 shows that year and was used in all of the Monkees' reunion tours through 2011. Following Jones's death in 2012, "Valleri" was not included in the reunion tours which featured Tork, Nesmith, and Dolenz; nor was it featured in subsequent Tork / Dolenz or Nesmith / Dolenz tour dates. In 2022, Dolenz celebrated the memory of three band members by including "Valleri" in shows from 2022-2024.

== Reception ==
Record World called the track "a hard rock ditty that the Monkees will sing to the top of the charts." Billboard called the single an "easy-beat rocker" and considered the 45 rpm record as containing "two blockbuster sides" with "Tapioca Tundra" as the B-side. Chicago Tribune pop music and culture columnist Robb Baker said, "It's hard to find rock any better than 'Tapioca Tundra,' 'Valleri' or 'Daydream Believer' in his review of the Monkees album, The Birds, The Bees & The Monkees. U.K. music critic Brian K. Jones said, "Great must be a huge hit" and "the nearest yet they have got to The Beatles."

== Personnel ==
Credits adapted from Rhino Handmade 2010 "Deluxe Edition" box set.

The Monkees

- Davy Jones – lead vocals

Additional musicians

- Gerry McGee – rhythm guitar
- Louie Shelton – lead guitar
- Joe Osborn – bass guitar
- Billy Lewis – drums, tambourine
- Jim Horn – saxophone
- Jay Migliori – saxophone
- Roy Caton – trumpet
- Ollie Mitchell – trumpet
- Lewis McCreary – trombone

== Charts ==
=== Weekly charts ===
Chart (1968)	Peak position
Australia (Go-Set)	5
Austria	20
Canada (The RPM 100)	1
Finland (Suomen Virallinen)	38
Germany	11
Ireland	8
Japan	4
Netherlands	12
Norway	9
New Zealand	4
South Africa (Springbok)	15
UK (Record Retailer)	12
US Billboard Hot 100	3
US Cash Box Top 100	1

=== Year-end charts ===
Chart (1968)	Rank
Canada	89

== See also ==
- List of Cash Box Top 100 number-one singles of 1968

== Bibliography ==
- The Monkees Tale, Eric Lefcowitz (Last Gasp Press) (ISBN 0-86719-338-7)
- Monkeemania! The True Story of the Monkees, Glenn A. Baker, Tom Czarnota & Peter Hogan (St. Martin's Press) (ISBN 0-312-00003-0)
