= Porpoise Song =

- US picture sleeve

Single by the Monkees

from the album Head
- B-side: "As We Go Along"
- Released: October 5, 1968
- Recorded: February 26-29, 1968; California Recorders; Hollywood, CA
- Genre: Baroque pop; psychedelic pop; progressive pop
- Length: 2:56 (LP); 4:00 (single)
- Label: Colgems
- Songwriters: Gerry Goffin; Carole King
- Producer: Gerry Goffin

The Monkees singles chronology
"D. W. Washburn" (1968)	"Porpoise Song" (1968)	"Tear Drop City" (1969)

"Porpoise Song" is a song written by Gerry Goffin and Carole King and performed by the Monkees as the theme song for their 1968 film Head and its accompanying soundtrack album.

== Background and composition ==
In the Monkees' 1968 feature film Head, the song appears at the beginning and end of the production in two variations on the same scene. At the start of the film, the group are being chased, running onto a bridge. In an attempt to escape, Dolenz jumps from the bridge as the others look on in shock. As Dolenz sinks, he is saved from drowning by a couple of beautiful mermaids. At the end of the film, the other members follow Dolenz and jump or fall from the bridge. As they appear to swim to shore, the camera zooms out, revealing them to be trapped in a large glass tank of water which is driven away on the back of a truck. Footage in both sequences is extensively solarized.

Micky Dolenz provides the double-tracked vocals, except for the "goodbye, goodbye" part of the chorus which is sung by Davy Jones. A mix of organ riffs, cello, double bass, woodwinds, and horns float in and out of the song. Chimes, tubular bells and various aquatic sound effects can also be heard. The lyrics call into question the Monkees' prefabricated image and reflect their desire for creative freedom and authenticity, including a veiled reference to Dolenz’ childhood work on the television series Circus Boy.

The song was recorded on February 26, 28 and 29 of 1968, with Goffin producing. Andrew Sandoval, author of The Monkees: The Day-by-Day Story of the 60s TV Pop Sensation, considered it "the most elaborate production ever for a Monkees recording."

Bob Rafelson, the co-creator of the Monkees television series and director of Head, recalled:

Carole King was living in an apartment building on Sunset Boulevard, and I went to her apartment every day, and we would sit and we would talk. That song was critical to me. 'A face, a voice, an overdub has no choice.' In other words, the whole synthetic process of making the Monkees' records was about to be [examined] in the movie. They are constantly being picked up, used, transplanted, subjected to influence by the [guru], by the war, by the media, and all of these things are exposed. They are always [portrayed] as the victims of their own fame. That's what I chose to make the movie about...

It was Carole or Gerry's idea to record live porpoise sounds and use them on the track. That's what you hear [at the end of the song]. I just thought that they were the appropriate people. It is far and away my favorite Monkees' song.

== Release ==
The single version of "Porpoise Song" contains an extended instrumental outro not included on the album version.

A special edit, made for AM stations, was released as a promotional single. This edit is 2:31 in duration. It was also released by RCA Victor in the UK in August 1969 as the B-side to Daddy's Song.

== Critical reception ==
Cash Box described the song as having a "'progressive' feel" and "a thundering rhythm line akin to the Beatles' 'I Am the Walrus.'"

Noel Gallagher of Oasis called "Porpoise Song" "an amazing song" and "one of the great psychedelic moments in recorded history" in a 2016 interview with the Detroit Free Press.

== Personnel ==
Per Andrew Sandoval.

The Monkees

- Micky Dolenz – lead vocals
- Davy Jones – backing vocals

Other musicians

- Ken Bloom – guitar
- Danny "Kootch" Kortchmar – guitar
- Leon Russell – keyboards
- Ralph Schuckett – keyboards
- Michael Ney – drums, percussion
- John Raines – drums, percussion
- Doug Lubahn – electric bass
- Bill Hinshaw – brass, woodwind
- Jules Jacob – brass, woodwind
- Gregory Bemko – cello
- David Filerman – cello
- Jan Kelly – cello
- Jacqueline Lustgarten – cello
- Max Bennett – upright bass
- Clyde "Whitey" Hoggan – upright bass
- Jim Hughart – upright bass
- Jerry Scheff – upright bass
- Russ Titelman – cymbals
- Uncredited – additional guitar, additional backing vocals, chimes

== Chart performance ==
Chart (1968-1969)	Peak position
Australia (Kent Music Report)	57
Canada (The RPM 100)	26
US Billboard Hot 100	62
US Cashbox Top 100	41

== Other versions ==
- 1987: Steaming Coils on the album Never Creak
- 1988: Bongwater on the 7" limited-edition single "You Don't Love Me Yet", Shimmy 7-98
- 1995: Trouble on the album Plastic Green Head
- 1996: Wondermints on the album Wonderful World of The Wondermints
- 1997: The Lightning Seeds as a B-side to the single "Sugar Coated Iceberg"
- 1999: The Church on the album A Box of Birds
- 2000: The Grapes of Wrath on the album Extended Field Trip
- 2003: DJ Nobody (also known as Elvin Estela, later of Blank Blue) on the album Pacific Drift: Western Water Music, Vol. 1
- 2004: ...And You Will Know Us By the Trail of Dead, both live and on their 2004 EP Worlds Apart
- 2010: Andrew WK, live
- 2014: Django Django, as part of the "Late Night Tales" series
- 2014: Progressive rock band Glass Hammer, on the album Ode to Echo
- 2014 - 2015: The Polyphonic Spree, Live

== In popular culture ==
- The song was featured in Vanilla Sky, a 2001 film starring Tom Cruise, Penélope Cruz and Cameron Diaz.
- The song was played over the end credits of the Mad Men Season 6 episode "The Quality of Mercy."
