= Daddy's Song =

1968 song by Harry Nilsson

Song by Harry Nilsson

from the album Aerial Ballet
- Released: July 1968
- Studio: RCA Victor, Hollywood
- Length: 2:44
- Label: RCA Victor
- Songwriter: Harry Nilsson
- Producer: Rick Jarrard

Official audio
- "Daddy's Song" (Audio) on YouTube

"Daddy's Song" is a 1968 song written and recorded by Harry Nilsson. It was also recorded by The Monkees and featured in the group's film Head.

== Background ==
Nilsson overdubbed his vocal four times to create a "four-man group" sound. The song was included on the first pressing of Nilsson's third studio album Aerial Ballet. It was removed from later pressings of the album to boost the success of the Head soundtrack album, on which The Monkees' version of the song appeared. George Tipton arranged the track.

== The Monkees' version ==
"Daddy's Song"

Single by The Monkees

from the album Head
- B-side: "Porpoise Song"
- Released: August 1969 (UK)
- Recorded: January 10-April 4, 1968
- Studio: RCA Victor, Hollywood
- Genre: Pop rock
- Length: 2:29
- Label: RCA Victor
- Songwriter: Harry Nilsson
- Producer: The Monkees

Official audio
- "Daddy's Song" on YouTube

On January 10, 1968, Michael Nesmith produced the basic track for The Monkees' version of "Daddy's Song" at RCA in Hollywood. Nesmith and a group of session musicians recorded the song in 21 takes. The song's intro was added during take 16, which according to Andrew Sandoval, helped the musicians find "an easier way of falling into the groove." Harry Nilsson, who wrote the song, played piano on the session, which also included versions of his songs "Good Times" and "The Story of Rock and Roll", both of which were left unfinished. Nesmith later added a processed lead vocal and "an additional electric guitar" to take 21 of "Daddy's Song". Nesmith's vocal was not released until 1994. Additional instrumental overdubs took place on January 19, where a brass and cello arrangement was added. On March 1, the arrangement was further augmented, and a "prominent fluglehorn" was also added to the recording.

"Daddy's Song" was not considered for inclusion in the Monkees' film Head until March. In the script, Davy Jones was originally intended to sing Nesmith's composition "Magnolia Simms", which would appear on the group's album The Birds, the Bees, & the Monkees. Nesmith wanted to perform "Daddy's Song" in the film, but was prevented from doing so by Nilsson. In the film's DVD commentary, Nesmith stated, "I wanted to do the dance to 'Daddy's Song' but Nilsson said no, Davy is the song-and-dance man. For me it was an aspiration; for him it was a vocation. When Davy did the song it put the song into a different space, a Broadway space."

On April 4, Jones recorded a brief insert section for the song with piano backing by Michael Rubini. The extra section did not appear on official releases of the song until an alternate mix appeared on The Monkees' Music Box compilation box set in 2001. Four days later, Jones filmed the "Daddy's Song" sequence at Columbia Studios. In the film, the character Davy performs a dance routine to the song choreographed by Toni Basil, who was also Jones' dancing partner in the scene. Basil only received credit as choreographer. In an article for 16, Jones claimed to have lost ten pounds learning the routine. Jones worked with costume designer Gene Ashman to create two identical tuxedos, one black with a white shirt, and vice versa, both of which Jones wore during the scene. In the book The Monkees, Head, and the 60s, Peter Mills praised director Bob Rafelson's "seamless" editing of Jones performing the dance routine on alternating dark and light-colored sets. The film used the extended version of the song, although Jones sang the vocals for the insert section live, and a string accompaniment was also used on the soundtrack.

On April 25, engineer Henry Lewy prepared a mono mix of the song. Sandoval noted "parts of this particular mix may be used in the film soundtrack". On August 1, "Daddy's Song" was mixed in mono for the film, and in stereo for the film's soundtrack album.

=== Release and critical reception ===
The Monkees' version of the song was intended for release as a single from the Head soundtrack album, but Screen Gems decided against it due to Nilsson having already released his version on RCA. "Porpoise Song" was instead released as a single. "Daddy's Song" appeared as the fourth track of side two on the album when it was released in November 1968.

In August 1969, RCA released "Daddy's Song" as a single in the UK with "Porpoise Song" as the B-side. However, the single failed to chart.

Matthew Greenwald of AllMusic praised the song and described it as "one of the most buoyant songs on the Head soundtrack." In the book Long Title: Looking For the Good Times: Examining the Monkees' Songs, One By One, Michael A. Ventrella wrote, "Nilsson songs work great for Davy and he always gives them justice. Definitely one of [Davy's] better songs."

=== Personnel ===
Per Andrew Sandoval.

The Monkees

- Davy Jones - vocals
- Michael Nesmith - acoustic guitar, electric guitar

Other musicians

- Harry Nilsson - piano
- Rick Dey - bass
- Eddie Hoh - drums
- Tony Terran - trumpet
- Pete Candoli - trumpet
- Buddy Childers - trumpet
- Dick Leith - trombone
- Lew McCreary - trombone
- Stu Williamson or Cappy Lewis - flugelhorn
- Ray Kramer - cello
- Eleanor Slatkin - cello
- Emmet Sargeant - cello
- Justin DiTullio - cello
- Keith Allison - unknown
- Bill Chadwick - unknown
