= Instant Replay (The Monkees album) =

Studio album by the Monkees
- Released: February 15, 1969
- Recorded: July 18, 1966–January 10, 1969
- Studios: United Recorders (Hollywood); RCA Victor (Nashville); RCA Victor (Hollywood); Western Recorders, Nos. 1 & 2 (Hollywood); Wally Heider, No. 3 (Hollywood); Sunset Sound Recorders (Hollywood)
- Genre: Pop rock
- Length: 33:31
- Label: Colgems
- Producers: Tommy Boyce, Bobby Hart, Michael Nesmith, Micky Dolenz, Felton Jarvis, Davy Jones, Carole Bayer Sager, Neil Sedaka, Bones Howe

The Monkees chronology
| Head (1968) | Instant Replay (1969) | Greatest Hits (1969) |

Singles from Instant Replay
- 1. "Tear Drop City" / "A Man Without a Dream" Released: February 8, 1969

Cover for Rhino CD Reissue

Professional ratings
Review scores
| Source | Rating |
|---|---|
| AllMusic | 4/5 stars |

Instant Replay is the seventh studio album by the American pop rock band the Monkees. It was released in February 1969 by Colgems.

== Background ==
Instant Replay was the first album released after Peter Tork left the group and the only album of the original nine studio albums that does not include any songs featured in the TV show.

On January 10, 1969, versions of Dolenz's "Rose Marie", Nesmith's "Carlisle Wheeling", and Dolenz's "Mommy and Daddy" were mixed and considered for inclusion on the album, but were dropped from the final track listing. Dolenz continued to rework "Rose Marie" throughout the year, although the song never appeared on an album until a remix appeared on the 1987 compilation Missing Links. A vintage mix of the song later appeared as a bonus track on the 1994 Rhino CD of Instant Replay, as did an October 1968 mix of "Carlisle Wheeling". After Lester Sill rejected "Mommy and Daddy" due to its lyrical content, Dolenz reworked the track, which would appear on the Monkees' next album, The Monkees Present.

== Songs ==
Several tracks on Instant Replay date to 1966. The oldest song featured on the album was "I Won't Be the Same Without Her", which was tracked on July 18, 1966. The newest song recorded for the album was "A Man Without a Dream", which was tracked on November 7, 1968. The album was assembled on January 30, 1969.

=== Side one ===
"Through the Looking Glass"

Tommy Boyce and Bobby Hart produced a version of "Through the Looking Glass" for the Monkees in 1966, although it was not used on the Instant Replay album. Boyce said, "I think it was an imaginary song we wrote about a couple of girls we knew. Sort of like an Alice in Wonderland type of thing: you walk through the mirror, 'Through the Looking Glass' ... and go through this glass into a different world." The basic track for the version of the song featured on the album dates to December 1967, when Boyce and Hart produced several remakes of unreleased Monkees songs they had written. The recording was further augmented in February and in December 1968.

"Don't Listen to Linda"

"Don't Listen to Linda" was another song which Boyce and Hart had originally produced for the group in 1966, but was left unreleased at the time. Boyce recalled that the song was named after the wife of record producer Richard Perry, and stated, "Even though it said, 'Don't listen to Linda,' I didn't really mean that when we wrote it. It just was a great title. Of course, I apologized to her later and said I didn't really mean all these things. She liked the song." The song had initially been recorded as an uptempo number, but when Boyce and Hart remade the backing track in December 1967, they rearranged the song as a "love ballad". The track received a guitar overdub in December 1968, as did "Through the Looking Glass" and "Me Without You" during the same session.

"I Won't Be the Same Without Her"

Michael Nesmith produced the group's version of the Gerry Goffin and Carole King song "I Won't Be the Same Without Her" over the summer of 1966. Peter Tork was one of five guitarists who played on the track, though Andrew Sandoval notes "it is only possible to precisely discern that Glen Campbell plays the tremelo'd 12-string guitar part on this track." Sandoval notes that the song was "most likely" completed before Instant Replay was released.

"Just a Game"

"Just a Game" was written by Micky Dolenz, who said he was encouraged to record the song after playing the song to Nesmith. In March 1967, Dolenz recorded a demo of the song, then titled "There's a Way", during sessions for the Monkees' Headquarters album. The following year, Dolenz produced a version of the song for the group, with a large ensemble of session musicians conducted by Shorty Rogers. Michael Rubini played harpsichord, and Dolenz played acoustic guitar on the track with Tommy Tedesco. According to Sandoval, the song was announced at the April 1968 session as "French Song". Dolenz completed "Just a Game" in June.

"Me Without You"

Boyce and Hart wrote and produced "Me Without You", which was modeled after The Beatles' song "Your Mother Should Know". Boyce recalled the song was inspired in part by "a couple of our friends that were splitting up, that shouldn't have been splitting up." The backing track to "Me Without You" was recorded in December 1967, and augmented with a guitar overdub the following year. The song's original mix featured "a prominent solo played on a calliope", which was ultimately dropped from the version featured on the album.

"Don't Wait for Me"

Michael Nesmith's "Don't Wait for Me" was originally copyrighted in January 1966 by Randy Sparks' publishing firm Country Music, Inc. which owned the rights to a number of pre-Monkees Nesmith compositions at the time. In May 1968, Nesmith recorded the backing track during a series of Monkees sessions he produced in Nashville with session musicians. Nesmith stated, "It's just a pop tune. No particular inspiration at all. It's just me noodling on the guitar, playin' a song."

=== Side two ===
"You and I"

Bill Chadwick wrote "You and I" as "kind of a poem to a friend. We were both moving up in the entertainment business and realized that it's not a lasting thing, to say the least." Davy Jones helped Chadwick complete the song, in addition to performing the lead vocal. Neil Young performed a "blistering guitar solo" on the track. Jones produced the backing track in May 1968 at Wally Heider Recording. The following month, Jones added his lead vocal and additional guitar overdubs by Chadwick and Young to the song at Sunset Sound Recorders. In September, Jones completed the track at RCA, where Chadwick and Louie Shelton added additional guitar parts.

"While I Cry"

In November 1967, Nesmith produced a version of "While I Cry" as an instrumental for his first solo album The Wichita Train Whistle Sings, where it was titled "While I Cried". In January 1968, he recorded a version for the Monkees as a slow ballad with lyrics. Nesmith said, "It's me playing guitar, a guitar lick that I was just foolin' around with and wrote a song around the lick. Not an uncommon move."

"Tear Drop City"

Boyce and Hart wrote and produced "Tear Drop City" for the Monkees in 1966. The song was based on a riff similar to one used in the Sir Douglas Quintet's "She's About a Mover". Hart stated the song was built around a seventh chord progression similar to the Monkees' first hit "Last Train to Clarksville". "Tear Drop City' was recorded as a potential album track for More of the Monkees, but was shelved until January 1969, when it was mixed in preparation for release as a single. The song charted at number 56 on the Billboard Hot 100.

"The Girl I Left Behind Me"

Neil Sedaka and Carole Bayer wrote and produced "The Girl I Left Behind Me" for the Monkees. A version of the song was tracked on November 23, 1966 as a potential track for More of the Monkees, although it was not used on the Instant Replay album. Sedaka recalled that the group's music coordinator Don Kirshner passed on including the song in the final track listing, but assured him it would be on the group's next album. Sedaka said, "I was so discouraged because it was left off the album. As a result I lost a lot of money. I don't think it ever came out." Davy Jones produced his own version of the track for the group in late 1967, (Note: Jones later attempted to integrate "Girl Named Love", which he had written with Charlie Smalls, into the song as a tag piece, although he never completed a vocal for the section. The final recording was "nearly seven minutes" long.) followed by another remake in early 1968 with co-producers Sill and Rogers which became the version of the song included on the Instant Replay album. Jones' 1967 version was released as a bonus track on the 1994 Rhino CD of The Birds, the Bees & the Monkees.

"A Man Without a Dream"

Between 1967 and 1969, four studio versions of Goffin and King's "A Man Without a Dream" were recorded for, or by, the Monkees. According to Sandoval, the group "apparently taped" a version in May 1967 with Chip Douglas as producer. In June, Peter Tork recorded a demo of his arrangement for the song on acoustic guitar for Douglas. Douglas began work on a new version of the song for the group in August, using Tork's arrangement. Tork played piano during the session. In September, George Tipton conducted a "12-piece brass and string ensemble", which was added to the track. The recording was abandoned afterwards. In March 1968, when the group were filming Head, producers Sill, Rogers and Jack Keller tracked a new version of the song without any direct Monkee involvement, but still using Tork's arrangement. This version was also never completed. The final version of the song, produced by Bones Howe, would appear on the Instant Replay album. On November 7, 1968, Howe tracked his version of the song for the group. Additional overdubs were recorded in January 1969, including a lead vocal by Jones. In February, the song was released as the B-side of the "Tear Drop City" single.

"Shorty Blackwell"

Micky Dolenz wrote "Shorty Blackwell" about his life, and was also inspired by his cat, whom the song was named after. Dolenz recorded the basic track in January 1968, on which he played piano. Over time, Dolenz added more sections to the song until it was "well over five minutes" in length. Dolenz added more instrumentation in February and to a greater extent in April, at the same session as "Just a Game". Shorty Rogers arranged the track, which featured various brass, strings, percussion, cello, and flute parts. Rubini played piano on the track, and Tommy Tedesco played electric 12-string guitar. Additional brass and percussion were added to the backing track at the end of the month. Micky and his sister Coco recorded their vocals in May, before Micky completed the song the following month. In later years, Dolenz disaparaged the track, calling it "a typical kind of 1960s spaced-out ... my feeble attempt at something to do with Sgt. Pepper".

== Release ==
"Tear Drop City" was released as a single from the album, with "A Man Without a Dream" as the B-side. The single was not a major hit, only managing to reach number 56 on the Billboard Hot 100. Despite the single's poor chart performance, the album charted on the Billboard Top 40 Albums chart at No. 32.

In 2011, Rhino Handmade released an 89-track deluxe edition of Instant Replay. Disc 1 features stereo versions and various remixed versions. Disc 2 features mono released and unreleased versions. Disc 3 features alternate takes, backing tracks, and tapes from the television special 33⅓ Revolutions per Monkee. The 7-inch vinyl single has two songs sourced from acetate: alternate mixes of "I Go Ape" and "(I Prithee) Do Not Ask for Love".

== Critical reception ==
Cash Box wrote that the album was "a real powerhouse, perhaps the Monkees' best to date". Tim Sendra of AllMusic praised the album, writing that "each of the remaining Monkees truly shines", and noting that the album "stands with the group's best work".

== Track listing ==
Side one
| No. | Title | Writer(s) | Lead vocals | Length |
|---|---|---|---|---|
| 1. | "Through the Looking Glass" | Red Baldwin, Tommy Boyce, Bobby Hart | Micky Dolenz | 2:43 |
| 2. | "Don't Listen to Linda" | Boyce, Hart | Davy Jones | 2:49 |
| 3. | "I Won't Be the Same Without Her" | Gerry Goffin, Carole King | Michael Nesmith | 2:42 |
| 4. | "Just a Game" | Dolenz | Dolenz | 1:49 |
| 5. | "Me Without You" | Boyce, Hart | Jones | 2:11 |
| 6. | "Don't Wait for Me" | Nesmith | Nesmith | 2:36 |

Side two
| No. | Title | Writer(s) | Lead vocals | Length |
|---|---|---|---|---|
| 1. | "You and I" | Bill Chadwick, Jones | Jones | 2:15 |
| 2. | "While I Cry" | Nesmith | Nesmith | 3:01 |
| 3. | "Tear Drop City" | Boyce, Hart | Dolenz | 1:59 |
| 4. | "The Girl I Left Behind Me" | Carole Bayer Sager, Neil Sedaka | Jones | 2:43 |
| 5. | "A Man Without a Dream" | Goffin, King | Jones | 3:04 |
| 6. | "Shorty Blackwell" | Dolenz | Dolenz | 5:46 |

== Personnel ==
Credits adapted from Rhino Handmade 2011 "Deluxe Edition" box set.

The Monkees

- Micky Dolenz – lead vocals (1, 4, 9, 12), acoustic guitar (4), backing vocals (12), piano (12)
- Davy Jones – lead vocals (2, 5, 7, 10–11), backing vocals (7, 11)
- Michael Nesmith – lead vocals (3, 6, 8), backing vocals (3), guitar (8)

Additional musicians

- Keith Allison – guitar (1)
- Wayne Erwin – guitar (1, 9)
- Gerry McGee – guitar (1–2, 5, 7, 9)
- Louis Shelton – guitar (1–2, 5, 9), additional guitar (7)
- James Burton – guitar (3)
- Glen Campbell – guitar (3)
- Neil Young – guitar (7)
- Al Gafa – guitar (10)
- Willard Suyker – guitar (10)
- Don Thomas – guitar (10)
- Bobby Hart – tack piano (1), keyboards (5), backing vocals (9)
- Joe Osborn – bass guitar (1–2, 5, 7, 11)
- Bob West – bass guitar (3)
- Max Bennett – bass guitar (4, 12)
- Bobby Dyson – bass guitar (6)
- Rick Dey – bass guitar (8)
- Larry Taylor – bass guitar (9)
- Russ Savakus – bass guitar (10)
- Billy Lewis – drums (1–2, 5, 9)
- Jerry Carrigan – drums (6)
- Eddie Hoh – drums (8)
- Herbie Lovelle – drums (10)
- Alan Estes – percussion (1), tambourine (9)
- Tommy Boyce – guitar (2), backing vocals (9)
- Al Casey – guitar (3)
- Mike Deasy – guitar (3), acoustic guitar (track 11)
- Peter Tork – guitar (3), Danelectro bass (3)
- Larry Knechtel – piano (3, 11), organ (7)
- Hal Blaine – drums (3, 7, 11), tambourine (11)
- Gary Coleman – percussion (3)
- Frank DeVito – percussion (3)
- Joe Porcaro – percussion (4, 12)
- Victor Feldman – percussion (12)
- Emil Richards – percussion (12)
- Tommy Tedesco – acoustic guitar (4, 11), electric 12-string guitar (12)
- Michel Rubini – harpsichord (4), piano (12)
- Jim Gordon – drums (4, 12), percussion (12)
- Bud Brisbois – trumpet (4, 12)
- Buddy Childers – trumpet (4, 11–12)
- Oliver Mitchell – trumpet (4, 12)
- Ray Triscari – trumpet (4, 12)
- George Roberts – trombone (4, 12)
- Vincent DeRosa – French horn (4, 11–12)
- David Duke – French horn (4, 12)
- Dick Perissi – French horn (4, 11–12)
- Ronnie Lang – flute (4, 12)
- Ted Nash – flute (4, 12)
- Bud Shank – flute (4, 12)
- George Berres – violin (4, 12)
- Anatol Kaminsky – violin (4, 12)
- Bernard Kundell – violin (4, 12)
- Erno Neufeld – violin (4, 12)
- Nathan Ross – violin (4, 12)
- Joseph Stepansky – violin (4, 12)
- Justin DiTullio – cello (4, 12)
- Armand Kaproff – cello (4, 12)
- Edgar Lustgarten – cello (4, 12)
- Coco Dolenz – backing vocals (4, 12), lead harmony vocals (12)
- Harold Bradley – acoustic guitar (6)
- Lloyd Green – steel guitar (6)
- Sonny Osborne – banjo (6)
- David Briggs – piano (6)
- Bill Chadwick – additional guitar (7), backing vocals (8), unspecified (8)
- Ron Hicklin – backing vocals (9)
- Neil Sedaka – keyboards (10)
- Leo Kahn – violin (10)
- Julius Schachter – violin (10)
- Maurice Bialkin – cello (10)
- Jimmy Rowles – piano (11)
- Conte Candoli – trumpet (11)
- Bob Edmondson – trombone (11)
- Lew McCreary – trombone (11)
- Jim Decker – French horn (11)
- Bill Hinshaw – French horn (11)
- Don Addrisi – backing vocals (11)
- Kenny Shroyer – trombone (12)

Unconfirmed personnel and duties

- Horns, strings (1–2)
- Additional backing vocals (3, 11)
- Calliope, tambourine, horns, backing vocals (5)
- Keith Allison – unknown (8)
- Bill Chadwick – unknown (8, 12)
- Harry Nilsson – unknown (8)
- Backing vocals (8, 10)
- Additional guitar (11)

Technical

- Tommy Boyce – producer (1–2, 5, 9), arranger (9)
- Bobby Hart – producer (1–2, 5, 9), arranger (9)
- Don McGinnis – arranger (1–2, 5)
- Michael Nesmith – producer (3, 6, 8), arranger (3, 6, 8)
- Micky Dolenz – producer (4, 12)
- Shorty Rogers – arranger (4, 7, 12)
- Felton Jarvis – producer (6)
- Davy Jones – producer (7)
- Carole Bayer Sager – producer (10)
- Neil Sedaka – producer (10), arranger (10)
- Bones Howe – producer (11), arranger (11)
- Bob Alcivar – arranger (11)
- Bill Holman – arranger (11)
- Brendan Cahill – music coordinator
- Alan Wolsky – cover design

== Charts ==
| Chart (1969) | Peak position |
|---|---|
| Canadian Albums (RPM) | 45 |
| Japanese Albums (Oricon) | 26 |
| US Billboard 200 | 32 |
