= Justus (album) =

Studio album by the Monkees
- Released: October 15, 1996
- Recorded: June–August 1996
- Studio: NRG (North Hollywood)
- Genre: Rock
- Length: 39:55
- Label: Rhino
- Producer: The Monkees

The Monkees chronology
Missing Links Volume Three (1996)	Justus (1996)	I'm a Believer and Other Hits (1997)

Professional ratings
Review scores
Source	Rating
AllMusic	2.5/5 stars
Entertainment Weekly	C−
Los Angeles Times	3/4 stars

Justus is the eleventh studio album by the American rock band the Monkees, released on October 15, 1996 by Rhino Records. The album was recorded in celebration of their 30th anniversary and features the return of Michael Nesmith to the group.

== Background ==
Justus was the first Monkees album since Head (1968) to feature all four Monkees. It was also the first album to be exclusively written, performed and produced by all four members of the band.

Although preliminary work on the album was begun using songs from various writers, upon Michael Nesmith's agreement to join the production, it was agreed that all songs would be written only by the four members of the group. Nesmith sang lead vocals on a remake of his "Circle Sky", wrote the song "Admiral Mike" (sung by Micky Dolenz), and provided background vocals for all tracks. While all four members of the Monkees receive producer's credit, Nesmith ultimately produced and mixed the project while the other three Monkees toured.

"Circle Sky" is a remake of the song from the Monkees' film Head, with new lyrics from Nesmith. "You and I" is a different song than the one of the same name on their 1969 album Instant Replay. The original version appeared on the 1976 album Dolenz, Jones, Boyce & Hart, a reunion of Jones and Dolenz with Monkees songwriters Tommy Boyce and Bobby Hart. Demo versions of "You and I", "It's Not Too Late" and "What a Night" appear on Davy Jones's solo anthology Just for the Record, Vol. 4. Justus was the final studio album to feature contemporary recordings of Jones before his death in 2012.

The title is pronounced as either "Justice" or "Just Us", the latter implying that only the four Monkees perform on the album.

== Release and promotion ==
Released in October 1996, Justus coincided with the 30th anniversary of the band's debut album. Concurrent with the album's release, Rhino Entertainment released an accompanying VHS tape of the same name, featuring music videos, interviews and backstage footage.

The tracks "Circle Sky", "You and I" and "Regional Girl" were promoted with music videos in the 1997 television special Hey, Hey, It's the Monkees. These songs, along with "Oh, What a Night", were performed as part of the 30th anniversary reunion tour.

On May 28, 2013, Friday Music reissued the album on CD and included a DVD of the original Justus special.

== Track listing ==
No.	Title	Writer(s)	Lead vocals	Length
1.	"Circle Sky"	Michael Nesmith	Nesmith	3:33
2.	"Never Enough"	Micky Dolenz	Dolenz	2:58
3.	"Oh, What a Night"	Davy Jones	Jones	3:12
4.	"You and I"	Dolenz, Jones	Jones	2:57
5.	"Unlucky Stars"	Dolenz	Dolenz	3:11
6.	"Admiral Mike"	Nesmith	Dolenz	3:23
7.	"Dyin' of a Broken Heart"	Dolenz	Dolenz	3:09
8.	"Regional Girl"	Dolenz	Dolenz	3:16
9.	"Run Away from Life"	Peter Tork	Jones	2:43
10.	"I Believe You"	Tork	Tork	3:41
11.	"It's My Life"	Dolenz	Dolenz	3:41
12.	"It's Not Too Late"	Jones	Jones	4:03

== Personnel ==
Credits adapted from CD liner notes.

The Monkees

- Micky Dolenz – drums, vocals
- Peter Tork – bass guitar, keyboards, vocals
- David Jones – percussion, guitar on "Circle Sky", vocals
- Michael Nesmith – guitars, vocals

Technical

- The Monkees – producers
- Mike McDonald – engineer, mixing, mastering
- Bob Bullock – engineer
- Steve Mixdorf – second engineer
- Terry W. Bates – second engineer
- Grant Greene – second engineer
- Tim Gerron – second engineer
- Rachel Gutek – art direction
- Greg Allen – package design
- Jay Silverman – cover photography
- Henry Diltz – inside photography
- Scott Shaw – cover concept
