= Circle Sky =

Song by The Monkees

from the album Head
- Released: November 1968
- Recorded: 1967–1968
- Studio: RCA, Hollywood, California
- Genre: Rock; garage rock
- Label: Colgems
- Songwriter: Michael Nesmith

"Circle Sky" is a 1968 song written by Michael Nesmith which appeared on The Monkees' sixth album, the Head soundtrack, and also in the film Head as a live concert performance.

== Background ==
The song is written and performed in style reminiscent to the work of musician Bo Diddley, staying mostly on a single chord (A Major), while strumming barre chords (from B Major to E Major) down the guitar neck for the intro, outro, and breaks, and from B minor to D minor for the bridge. The lyrics are impressions of sights and sounds on a Monkees tour, while the line "Hamilton smiling down" refers to a Hamilton music stand, used for rehearsals and recording. Michael Nesmith wrote the song so that the Monkees could easily perform it in concert.

== Recording ==
Nesmith began recording the studio version of "Circle Sky" in late 1967. On December 3, he added a lead vocal and various overdubs to take 6 of the basic track at RCA in Hollywood, California. On January 6, 1968, Nesmith continued further work on the track. Andrew Sandoval noted that possible overdubs were recorded on this date. Nesmith completed the recording two days later. Sandoval notes that the original bass track by John Gross may have been replaced "some time between the last session and this one" with a new bass track by Rick Dey, and that percussion may have also been added.

On May 17, 1968, the Monkees performed "Circle Sky" three times in concert at the Valley Music Hall in Salt Lake City, Utah for the film Head. On May 21, Nesmith overdubbed a new lead vocal over take 3 of the live version at RCA in Hollywood. The film intercut the Monkees performing the song with Vietnam War footage, including the execution of Nguyễn Van Lem, and featured several mirrored shots of the band onstage. The song was not mentioned in the original script, which used the placeholder title "It's Only War, That's All, So I'll See You Again Some Time" to refer to the song the Monkees would play during the concert sequence.

== Release ==
The studio version of "Circle Sky" appeared on the Head soundtrack album, which was released in November 1968. The song was released as a single in Greece.

A lo-fi transcription of the concert version was included on Monkeemania (40 Timeless Hits), a compilation from the early 1980s, and an alternate studio take appeared on Monkee Flips in 1984. A stereo recording of the concert version appeared on Missing Links Volume Two in 1990.

A reworked version of the song opened the Monkees's 1996 reunion album Justus, featuring a rare performance by Davy Jones on guitar. The Justus version appeared in the group's 1997 television special Hey, Hey, It's the Monkees.

== Personnel ==
Per Andrew Sandoval.

Studio version:

The Monkees:

- Michael Nesmith - lead vocal, guitar, organ, percussion

Other musicians:

- John S. Gross or Rick Dey - bass
- Eddie Hoh - drums, percussion
- Keith Allison - additional guitar
- Bill Chadwick - additional guitar

Per Andrew Sandoval.

Live version (May 17, 1968):

The Monkees:

- Michael Nesmith - lead vocal, electric guitar
- Davy Jones - percussion, organ
- Peter Tork - bass
- Micky Dolenz - drums

Justus version:

The Monkees:

- Michael Nesmith - lead vocal, guitar
- Davy Jones - guitar
- Peter Tork - bass
- Micky Dolenz - drums
