= Head (The Monkees album) =

1968 soundtrack album by the Monkees

Soundtrack album / studio album by the Monkees
- Released: November 19, 1968
- Recorded: December 9, 1967–August 3, 1968
- Studios: RCA Victor (Hollywood); Western Recorders (Hollywood); Sunset Sound Recorders (Hollywood); California Recorders (Hollywood); Wally Heider (Hollywood); Original Sound (Hollywood)
- Genres: Musique concrète; psychedelic
- Length: 29:17
- Label: Colgems
- Producers: The Monkees; Gerry Goffin

The Monkees chronology
The Birds, the Bees & the Monkees (1968)	Head (1968)	Instant Replay (1969)

Singles from Head
- 1. "Porpoise Song" / "As We Go Along" Released: October 5, 1968

Head is the sixth studio album by the American pop rock band the Monkees, released in 1968 by Colgems Records, and the soundtrack to the film of the same name. The album primarily consists of musique concrète pieces assembled from the film's dialogue, while the six new songs encompass genres such as psychedelic music, lo-fi, acid rock and Broadway theatre.

== Composition ==
After the TV series The Monkees ended in the spring of 1968, the band regrouped and wrote the film Head with screenwriter Jack Nicholson, who later coordinated the soundtrack album, editing dialogue excerpts from the film into the album's composition. The album approximates the flow of the movie and includes large portions of the dialogue. CriterionCast has suggested that the album's composition was influenced by Frank Zappa's Lumpy Gravy (1968). Regarding the album's composition, Peter Tork said, "Nicholson made it different from the movie. There's a line in the movie where Zappa says, 'That's pretty white.' Then there's another line in the movie that was not juxtaposed in the movie, but Nicholson put them together in the [soundtrack album], when Mike says, 'And the same thing goes for Christmas' [...] that was very important and wonderful that he assembled the record differently from the movie [...] It was a different artistic experience."

PopMatters described Head as "a hypnogogic hallucination of a 60's pop record" whose composition encompassed musique concrète pieces and six new songs in the genres of psychedelic, Broadway and lo-fi rock. It was the first Monkees album to not include a song written by Tommy Boyce and Bobby Hart. Some of the album showcases the songwriting skills of band members, particularly Tork, whose acid rock song "Long Title: Do I Have to Do This All Over Again?" and the "Eastern-flavored" song "Can You Dig It?" were described by AllMusic as being "not only among the best of the six original compositions on the soundtrack, but also among his finest Monkees offerings, period."

== Release ==
In 1986, Rhino Entertainment repressed vinyl record copies of the album. In 1994, the album was reissued on compact disc with six bonus tracks, including a live version of "Circle Sky", and an alternate version of "Daddy's Song" featuring Michael Nesmith on vocals instead of Davy Jones. In 2010, Rhino reissued the album in a deluxe box set on three compact discs. The following year, Rhino Handmade reissued Head on vinyl for the first time since its original 1968 release.

== Reception ==
Professional ratings
Review scores
Source	Rating
AllMusic	4/5 stars
MusicHound	3/5 stars

MusicHound described Head as a "trippy little souvenir of the times". AllMusic wrote that, "Without question, both the movie and album are the most adventurous and in many ways most fulfilling undertaking to have been born of the Monkees' multimedia manufactured project." PopMatters called Head "an almost accidental youngster's gateway to the avant-garde; there is a clear line for clued-in pre-teens leading from Head's 'Opening Ceremony' and 'Swami—Plus Strings, Etc.' to the Beatles' 'Revolution 9', and from there to Yoko Ono, Stockhausen, Krautrock, postpunk, and a million other directions." In 2013, Rolling Stone ranked the album at number 25 in their list of "The 25 Greatest Soundtracks of All Time".

== Track listing ==
Side one
No.	Title	Lead vocals	Length
1.	"Opening Ceremony"		1:19
2.	"Porpoise Song (Theme from Head)" (Gerry Goffin, Carole King)	Micky Dolenz	2:56
3.	"Ditty Diego—War Chant" (Jack Nicholson, Robert Rafelson)	Dolenz, Jones, Michael Nesmith, Peter Tork	1:27
4.	"Circle Sky" (Nesmith)	Nesmith	2:32
5.	"Supplicio"		0:49
6.	"Can You Dig It?" (Tork)	Dolenz	3:19
7.	"Gravy"		0:05

Side two
No.	Title	Lead vocals	Length
1.	"Superstitious"		0:06
2.	"As We Go Along" (King, Toni Stern)	Dolenz	3:53
3.	"Dandruff?"		0:40
4.	"Daddy's Song" (Harry Nilsson)	Jones	2:29
5.	"Poll"		1:12
6.	"Long Title: Do I Have to Do This All Over Again?" (Tork)	Tork	2:37
7.	"Swami—Plus Strings, Etc." (Ken Thorne)		5:18

== Personnel ==
Credits adapted from Rhino Handmade 2010 "Deluxe Edition" box set.

The Monkees

- Micky Dolenz – lead vocals (2–3, 6, 9)
- David Jones – backing vocals (2, 13), lead vocals (3, 11)
- Michael Nesmith – lead vocals (3–4), guitar (4), organ (4), percussion (4), acoustic guitar (11), electric guitar (11)
- Peter Tork – lead vocals (3, 13), guitar (6, 13), backing vocals (13)

Additional musicians

- Ken Bloom – guitar (2, 9)
- Danny "Kootch" Kortchmar – guitar (2, 9)
- Leon Russell – keyboards (2)
- Ralph Schuckett – keyboards (2)
- Mike Ney – drums (2), percussion (2)
- John Raines – drums (2), percussion (2)
- Doug Lubahn – bass guitar (2)
- Bill Hinshaw – brass (2), woodwind (2)
- Jules Jacob – brass (2), woodwind (2)
- Gregory Bemko – cello (2)
- David Filerman – cello (2)
- Jan Kelly – cello (2)
- Jacqueline Lustgarten – cello (2)
- Max Bennett – upright bass (2)
- Clyde "Whitey" Hoggan – upright bass (2)
- Jim Hughart – upright bass (2)
- Jerry Scheff – upright bass (2)
- Russ Titelman – cymbals (2)
- Michel Rubini – piano (3)
- Eddie Hoh – drums (4, 11), percussion (4)
- Lance Wakely – guitar (6, 13), bass guitar (6, 13)
- Ry Cooder – guitar (9)
- Carole King – guitar (9)
- Neil Young – guitar (9)
- Harvey Newmark – bass guitar (9)
- Earl Palmer – drums (9)
- Harry Nilsson – piano (11)
- Keith Allison – guitar (11)
- Bill Chadwick – guitar (11)
- Richard Dey – bass guitar (11)
- Pete Candoli – trumpet (11)
- Buddy Childers – trumpet (11)
- Tony Terran – trumpet (11)
- Dick Leith – trombone (11)
- Lew McCreary – trombone (11)
- Justin Ditullio – cello (11)
- Ray Kramer – cello (11)
- Emmet Sargeant – cello (11)
- Eleanor Slatkin – cello (11)
- Stephen Stills – guitar (13)
- Dewey Martin – drums (13)

Unconfirmed personnel and duties

- Additional guitar (2)
- Additional backing vocals, chimes (2)
- Bill Chadwick – guitar (4)
- Keith Allison – guitar (4)
- Richard Dey or John S. Gross – bass guitar (4)
- Peter Tork – other instruments (6)
- Lance Wakely – other instruments (6)
- Dewey Martin or Buddy Miles – drums (6)
- Chester Anderson – unknown (6)
- Don DeMieri – unknown (6)
- Michael A. Glass – unknown (6)
- Eddie Hoh – unknown (6)
- Bass, percussion (6)
- Denny Bruce – percussion (9)
- John Raines – percussion (9)
- John R. Hoening – unknown (9)
- Tony McCashen – unknown (9)
- Russ Titelman – unknown (9)
- Organ, flute (9)
- Stu Williamson or Carroll "Cappy" Lewis – flugelhorn solo (11)
- Tambourine, handclaps (13)

Technical

- The Monkees – producers (1, 3–14)
- Gerry Goffin – producer (2)
- Russ Titelman – conductor (2)
- Jack Nitzsche – arranger (2, 9)
- Shorty Rogers – arranger (11)
- Ken Thorne – arranger (14), conductor (14)
- Jack Nicholson – album coordinator

== Charts ==
=== Album ===
Chart (1968)	Peak position
Canadian Albums (RPM)	24
Japanese Albums (Oricon)	53
US Billboard 200	45

=== Single ===
Year	Single	Chart	Peak position
1968	"Porpoise Song"	Billboard Hot 100	62

== Sources ==
- Baker, Glenn A.; Czarnota, Tom; Hoga, Peter (1986). Monkeemania: The True Story of the Monkees. New York City: Plexus Publishing. pp. 91–102. ISBN 978-0859652926.
- Sandoval, Andrew (2005). The Monkees: The Day-by-Day Story of the 60s TV Pop Sensation. Thunder Bay Press. ISBN 1-59223-372-4.
