= Tear Drop City =

- US picture sleeve

Single by the Monkees

from the album Instant Replay
- B-side: "A Man Without a Dream"
- Released: February 8, 1969
- Recorded: October 26-November 6, 1966
- Studio: RCA Victor Studios (B); Hollywood, CA
- Genre: Rock
- Length: 2:01
- Label: Colgems
- Songwriters: Tommy Boyce; Bobby Hart
- Producers: Tommy Boyce; Bobby Hart

The Monkees singles chronology
"Porpoise Song" (1968)	"Tear Drop City" (1969)	"Listen to the Band" (1969)

"Tear Drop City" is a song by American pop rock group the Monkees. It was released as a single on February 8, 1969. Written by Tommy Boyce and Bobby Hart, it was the first single The Monkees released as a trio after Peter Tork departed from the group in December 1968.

== Background ==
Tommy Boyce and Bobby Hart wrote "Tear Drop City" in a park in Lankershim Boulevard. The song was built around a riff Boyce compared to the one used in "She's About a Mover" by the Sir Douglas Quintet. Boyce recalled the song was about Hart's troubled relationship with his girlfriend. Hart stated that he and Boyce "were experimenting along the lines of the seventh chord again, which The Beatles had used in several songs. We thought there was maybe room for another song besides 'Clarksville' using that seventh kind of progression, going from the fifth to the seventh and back, playing around those notes."

== Recording ==
The basic track was recorded on October 26, 1966 at RCA (B) in Hollywood, California. On October 30, Micky Dolenz added a lead vocal, and Tommy Boyce, Bobby Hart, and Ron Hicklin added backing vocals. The song was completed on November 6, when Dolenz added another lead vocal to the recording, and Boyce, Hart and Hicklin added additional backing vocals. The recording was left unreleased for several years afterwards. According to Andrew Sandoval, the song was originally recorded in "the key of F-sharp near the tempo of 'Tomorrow's Gonna Be Another Day.'"

== Release ==
On January 13, 1969, "Tear Drop City" received new mono and stereo mixes in preparation for its release as a single. Sandoval wrote that this was an attempt by Lester Sill of Colgems and Monkees associate Brendan Cahill to boost the group's declining popularity in the charts. The finished master was sped up by nine percent, "giving it a sprightly pace similar to 'Last Train to Clarksville.'" The single was released in stereo only, although the mono mix was used for promotional copies sent to radio stations. The B-side was "A Man Without a Dream". Both sides appeared on The Monkees' album Instant Replay. On February 5, The Monkees performed the song during their guest appearance on The Glen Campbell Goodtime Hour.

In a March 1969 interview with NME, Michael Nesmith claimed the release of "Tear Drop City" was "almost a concession on our part to certain people. It's one from the archives of Monkee music, one with Peter. You can call it a corporate swan song. And I'm sure it'll be commercially very profitable." On March 22, The Monkees appeared in a special "Monkee Day" episode of the TV series Happening to promote the single, but did not perform any music.

"Tear Drop City" reached number 56 on the Billboard Hot 100. The song was remixed in 1991 when it was included on The Monkees' Listen to the Band box set.

== Critical reception ==
Billboard predicted the song would "restore the group to the top part of the Hot 100 in short order", and noted that it was "[o]ne of their strongest commercial entries in some time." Cash Box praised the song's "[h]ard-hitting rhythmic power and a fine teen lyric."

In a retrospective review of the song, Matthew Greenwald of AllMusic noted "Tear Drop City"'s resemblance to "Last Train to Clarksville", and wrote it had "a strong 1966 period charm." In the book Long Title: Looking For The Good Times: Examining the Monkees' Songs, One By One, Mark Arnold wrote, "There are the inevitable comparisons to Last Train to Clarksville, but I still feel that this song stands on its own fairly well".

== Personnel ==
Credits adapted from Rhino Handmade 2011 "Deluxe Edition" box set.

The Monkees

- Micky Dolenz - lead vocals

Additional musicians

- Wayne Erwin – guitar
- Gerry McGee – guitar
- Louie Shelton – guitar
- Larry Taylor – bass guitar
- Billy Lewis – drums
- Gene Estes – tambourine
- Tommy Boyce – backing vocals
- Bobby Hart – backing vocals
- Ron Hicklin – backing vocals

== Chart performance ==
Chart performance for "Tear Drop City"
Chart (1969)	Peak position
Australia Kent Music Report	28
Canada The RPM 100	27
UK Singles (Official Charts)	44
US Billboard Hot 100	56
US Cashbox Top 100	37

== Other versions ==
In 1968, Boyce and Hart recorded the song as "Teardrop City" for their album I Wonder What She's Doing Tonite. In 1997, The Skeletons covered the song on their album Nothing to Lose.
