= Head (film) =

1968 film directed by Bob Rafelson and starring the Monkees

- Theatrical release poster
- Directed by: Bob Rafelson
- Written by: Bob Rafelson; Jack Nicholson
- Based on: The Monkees by Bob Rafelson; Bert Schneider
- Produced by: Bob Rafelson; Jack Nicholson
- Starring: The Monkees (Note: The Monkees are Peter Tork, Davy Jones, Micky Dolenz, and Michael Nesmith); Victor Mature; Sonny Liston; Annette Funicello; Carol Doda
- Cinematography: Michel Hugo
- Edited by: Mike Pozen
- Music by: Ken Thorne
- Production company: Raybert Productions
- Distributed by: Columbia Pictures
- Release date: November 6, 1968 (New York City)
- Running time: 86 minutes 110 minutes (original cut)
- Country: United States
- Languages: English; Italian

Head is a 1968 American satirical musical adventure film written and produced by Jack Nicholson and Bob Rafelson, directed by Rafelson, starring television rock group the Monkees (Davy Jones, Peter Tork, Micky Dolenz and Michael Nesmith) and distributed by Columbia Pictures. The film was a theatrical spin-off of the band's 1966–68 NBC television show.

The film featured Victor Mature as "The Big Victor" and cameo appearances by Nicholson, Teri Garr, Carol Doda, Annette Funicello, Frank Zappa, Sonny Liston, Timothy Carey, Percy Helton and Ray Nitschke. Also appearing on screen in brief non-speaking parts are Dennis Hopper and film choreographer Toni Basil.

== Plot ==
Unlike most movies, there is no "plot" per se in this movie, rather a succession of seemingly unrelated scenes. The throughline in the film comes from the themes inherent in it: a biting satire of television; an indictment of fame, especially fame gained too early in life; commentary on the Monkees themselves and their experience as both product and performers; and a meditation on the power of media.

Head begins at the dedication of a bridge. As a local politician struggles with his microphone during the dedication speech, the four members of the Monkees, Micky, Davy, Peter, and Mike, suddenly interrupt the ceremony by running through the assembled officials, to the sound of various horns and sirens.

A later scene shows each member of the group having just been kissed by the same groupie, who tells them that they were indistinguishable. This is juxtaposed with images of screaming fans at a Monkees concert, who would do anything to be that close to their idols. This kind of juxtaposition of opposites will be seen throughout the film. As the movie continues, they make their way both together and separately through a series of unrelated vignettes, each being a different type of movie (a mystery, a war movie, a western, a desert adventure, etc.). This nonlinear narrative mimics the experience of changing channels on a TV set, flipping through various shows and various genres as part of the film's satire of television.

Subsequent scenes, some reflecting the humor of their television show, others displaying clips of such real-life issues as the Vietnam War – and conspicuously, the execution of Viet Cong operative Nguyen Van Lem in 1968 – provide commentary on the way in which media reduces everything it displays to some sort of entertainment, even clips of people being brutally murdered, a scene that was widely shown on TV at the time. Throughout the film, the Monkees rebel against the unrealistic fiction that had been created about them – that they were mere actors on a TV show and not the talented musicians and performers they actually were – which they were trying to dispel with this movie.

At the end, the Monkees find themselves back on the same bridge they were on at the beginning of the movie. Just as before, they jump off the edge, demonstrating that they can "think outside the box" (the black box that in which they have been trapped at various points in the movie, representing the personal and artistic confinement of their TV show), and go in a direction not considered by all the "normal" people who use the bridge. In spite of their best efforts, the Monkees end up exactly where they started, looping back into the scene on the bridge to imply that life is circular, and the harder you try to escape from your circumstances, the more you end up back where you started.

In the final moments of the film, the group still underwater, is seen to be trapped – once again – in a huge tank, staring uncertainly through the glass and struggling under the water, perhaps suggesting that escaping one's fame – and one's status as a money-making product – is not as easy as gaining it.

== Cast ==
- Peter Tork as Peter
- Davy Jones as Davy
- Micky Dolenz as Micky
- Michael Nesmith as Mike
- Victor Mature as The Big Victor
- Annette Funicello as Teresa/Minnie
- Timothy Carey as Lord High 'n' Low
- Logan Ramsey as Officer Faye Lapid
- Abraham Sofaer as Swami
- Vito Scotti as I. Vitteloni
- Charles Macaulay as Inspector Shrink
- T. C. Jones as Mr. and Mrs. Ace
- Charles Irving as Mayor Feedback
- William Bagdad as Black Sheik
- Percy Helton as Heraldic Messenger
- Sonny Liston as Extra
- Ray Nitschke as Private One
- Carol Doda as Sally Silicone
- Frank Zappa as The Critic
- June Fairchild as The Jumper
- Terry Garr as Testy True
- I. J. Jefferson as Lady Pleasure
- Toni Basil as 'Daddy's Song' Dancer
- Lee Kolima as Guard
- Terry Chambers as Hero
- Mike Burns as Nothing
- Esther Shepard as Mother
- Kristine Helstoski as Girl Friend
- John Hoffman as The Sexfiend
- Linda Weaver as Lover Secretary
- Jim Hanley as Frodis
- Dennis Hopper as Long Haired Guy in Restaurant (uncredited)
- Bob Rafelson as himself (uncredited)
- Jack Nicholson as Movie Director in Restaurant (uncredited)

== Production ==
On October 12, 1966, Daily Variety revealed a feature film starring the Monkees was in the works. In December, Micky Dolenz told Army Archerd of Daily Variety, "We want it to be as different a movie as the series was to TV. And we want to bring back a lot of the old Hollywood glamour and excitement with it." In June 1967, during a Monkees press conference in London, Bob Rafelson claimed he had "tossed away" five potential scripts for Monkees films.

Around November 1967, the plot and peak moments of the film came together at an Ojai, California, resort where the Monkees, Rafelson, and Jack Nicholson brainstormed into a tape recorder, reportedly with the aid of a quantity of marijuana. According to Andrew Sandoval, other contributors included Rafelson's business partner Bert Schneider and "Monkees assistant" Brendan Cahill. Nicholson then took the tapes and used them as the basis for his screenplay, which according to Rafelson he structured while under the influence of LSD. On December 15, 1967, Rafelson and Nicholson completed a "final draft script" of the film, now called Changes. Rafelson recalled the title "seemed best because changes meant something at that time – to do with hallucinations and the cliché that the only thing you can rely on is change." A revision dated January 24, 1968 saw many key sequences added or revised, most of which would appear in the final film. A "long sequence to be shot in Japan involving The Monkees and Godzilla" was removed before filming began, Godzilla being the name of a character in the script. The character of Lord High 'n' Low is identified as "Dernsie" and Bruce Dern in the script, which Peter Mills claims was an indication Dern was the original choice for the role before Timothy Carey was cast. The script also featured the scene where Peter objects to having punched the waitress during the making of the film. Some contemporary magazines such as Monkee Spectacular and NME reported that the plot of the film would involve the Monkees riding across the United States on motorcycles.

Rafelson and Nicholson completed further script revisions on February 15. Filming was also scheduled to begin that day. When the band learned that they would not be allowed to direct themselves or to receive screenwriting credit, Dolenz, Davy Jones, and Michael Nesmith staged a one-day walkout, leaving Peter Tork the only Monkee on the set the first day. The strike ended after the first day when the studio agreed to a larger percentage share of the film's net for the group, but the incident damaged the Monkees' relationship with Rafelson and Schneider and would effectively end their professional relationship with the producers.

In a 1976 interview with Sight and Sound, Rafelson stated that the film "wasn't really" a natural offshoot of the Monkees' TV series, but felt that he and Schneider "were entitled, since we had made for Columbia an enormous amount of money in their record division and in television sales, to make a picture that would in a sense expose the process."

On February 19, production began at the Columbia Studios lot in Los Angeles, with two days of filming scenes on the Monkees' pad set. (Note: The next day, NBC officially canceled the Monkees' TV series.) Mimi Machu, who plays the woman who kisses each of the Monkees, was one of Nicholson's girlfriends. The war scenes were filmed at Bronson Canyon. The filmmakers were denied permission to use a mock Life magazine cover with Peter that appears in the film, but decided to ignore the request. Sequences were also filmed at the Grand Olympic Auditorium and the Hyperion Sewage Treatment Plant. As another film was in the works with the same title, Changes was renamed Untitled in March. (Note: In April, a Columbia spokesman told The New York Times, "[D]irector Bob Rafelson didn't think any of the titles suggested fit. Someone suggested Untitled and we all agreed pronto. Why not? Why not indeed.") Rafelson also remembered briefly renaming the film DASturb. The desert sequences were shot over three days beginning March 3 in Palm Springs. The first day of the shoot was described by Sandoval as "close to a bust", due to technical problems with the tank Dolenz was scheduled to use in a scene. The second day of the shoot focused "solely on Micky", and the third day saw the completion of Micky's desert scene, as well as the Monkees' scene in the desert near the end of the film. Filming temporarily paused on March 27 before resuming on April 8 with Davy Jones performing "Daddy's Song" at Columbia Studios. Nesmith had recorded vocals for a version of the song and wanted to perform the dance routine in the film, but Harry Nilsson, who wrote the song, requested that Jones perform it instead. Toni Basil choreographed the routine and appears as Jones' dancing partner in the scene. Jones sang a brief portion of the song live during filming. Production moved to the Columbia Ranch in Burbank on April 11 for "some underwater sequences [...] and action on the 'old West' set." Sometime during the month, Mike's birthday party scene was filmed on the set of Rosemary's Baby at Paramount Studios. The bridge ceremony sequences were filmed on the "brand new and unopened" Gerald Desmond Bridge at Long Beach.

In May, Dolenz filmed underwater sequences for the film's opening in The Bahamas. Nicholson served as second unit director during the shoot. Dolenz later remembered "[having] to hold my breath as long as I could then wave frantically at these two scuba guys, and they'd swim as fast as they could toward me, and I just remember the silver mouthpiece and I'd go 'urghh urghh' and surface and Jack would say 'OK, one more time.'" The concert sequence was filmed in Salt Lake City on May 17. Prior to the concert, Dolenz told The Salt Lake Tribune, "I think they picked Salt Lake City 'cos they had a big RCA contingent there. (Note: RCA distributed the Monkees' record label, Colgems.) And a lot of fans and a good venue. They knew they could fill it with a lot of screaming kids." It was the last sequence to be shot for the film. Filming was scheduled to take place at The Lagoon at Patio Gardens, but according to Sandoval, the performance was moved to Valley Music Hall to "better accommodate the film-crew's lighting needs." During the special concert, the Monkees performed "Circle Sky" three times. Tork led the audience through "War Chant", which was combined with "Ditty Diego" for release on the film's soundtrack album. The footage accompanying the "War Chant" sequence was filmed separately at the Rose Bowl in Pasadena. On May 21, Nesmith re-recorded his lead vocal for "Circle Sky" at RCA Studios in Hollywood, as the original live vocals were unusable.

The scenes of Peter in the snow during the "As We Go Along" sequence were filmed in Alaska. The vox pop interview sequence following Lord High 'n' Low's appearance at Mike's birthday party was conducted by satirist Mal Sharpe. Most of the questions were omitted from the film, leaving only the responses.

In July, the film was test screened in Los Angeles under the title Movee Untitled. Monkees Monthly reported the film received a mixed response from the audience, but that Rafelson was "quite satisfied" with the reaction. In September 1968, The Hollywood Reporter announced that the film had been officially titled Head. Rafelson later recalled the name change: "First of all, it took place in somebody's head, in Victor Mature's hair. The Monkees were dandruff. A lot of head imagery ..." A few days later, NME reported the film was being re-edited as the target audience found it too confusing.

Stock footage was incorporated from the films The Black Cat, Golden Boy, City of Conquest, Jam Session, Gilda, Salome, and other sources. Footage of the execution of Viet Cong operative (q.v.) Nguyễn Văn Lém by Brigadier General, and then Chief of National Police, Nguyễn Ngọc Loan was inserted into the film as an "anti-war" statement.

The film was cited in a contemporary Daily Variety article as costing between $1 and $2 million. Some sources cite the film's budget as $790,000.

== Music ==
The film's music included contributions by Carole King and Harry Nilsson. Jack Nicholson compiled the soundtrack album, which approximates the flow of the movie and includes large portions of the dialogue. The film's incidental music was composed and conducted by Ken Thorne, who also composed and conducted the incidental music to the Beatles' second film, Help!

The music of the Monkees often featured a rather dark subject matter beneath a superficially bright, uplifting sound. The music of the film takes the darkness and occasional satirical elements of the Monkees' earlier tunes and makes it far more overt, as in "Ditty Diego" or "Daddy's Song", which has Jones singing an upbeat, Broadway-style number about a boy abandoned by his father. In his 2012 essay on the soundtrack album, academic Peter Mills noted that "on this album the songs are only part of the story, as they were with the Monkees project as a whole: Signals, sounds, and ideas interfere with each other throughout."

The following songs appear during the film:

- "Porpoise Song" (theme) – Gerry Goffin, Carole King
- "Ditty Diego" – Bob Rafelson, Jack Nicholson
- "Circle Sky" – Michael Nesmith
- "Can You Dig It" – Peter Tork
- "As We Go Along" – Carole King, Toni Stern
- "Daddy's Song" – Harry Nilsson
- "Happy Birthday to You"
- "Long Title: Do I Have to Do This All Over Again?" – Peter Tork

The Monkees' rendition of "Happy Birthday to You" did not appear on the original release of the film's soundtrack album. "War Games", written by Davy Jones and Steve Pitts, was at one point intended to be featured in the film. Sandoval suggested "Changes", another Jones-Pitts composition, was a "potential song for the project." Michael Nesmith's "Magnolia Simms", which would appear on the Monkees' The Birds, the Bees & the Monkees album, was originally intended to appear in the spot in which "Daddy's Song" appeared in the final film. A version of Nesmith's "Carlisle Wheeling" was recorded for the film in May 1968, but was never completed and ultimately dropped from the soundtrack.

== Release ==
Head premiered in New York City on November 6, 1968 at the Columbia Pictures studio on West 54th Street. The film also opened simultaneously at The Cinema Studio and Greenwich theaters in the area. The film's Hollywood premiere took place at the Vogue Theatre on November 19. The Monkees attended both premieres. Cast members Sonny Liston, Frank Zappa, Annette Funicello, and Dennis Hopper also attended the film's Hollywood debut. The Los Angeles Times highlighted the appearances of various celebrity figures at the premiere. The film opened on November 20 in Los Angeles, Philadelphia, San Francisco, Washington and Boston.

On December 4, Head went into wide release in the Los Angeles area, where it played in theaters with the film Duffy. The films closed after one week. On December 13, Head opened in wide release in New York City, where it played with the 1967 film The Love-Ins, only to close after four days in theaters.

=== Marketing ===
Head's trailers summarized the film as the "most extraordinary adventure, western, comedy, love story, mystery, drama, musical, documentary satire ever made (And that's putting it mildly)." John Brockman was in charge of the film's public relations campaign. Two separate advertising campaigns were prepared for Head, described in press materials as "For The 'Modern' Film Audience!" and "For the Monkees Fans!", respectively. "Campaign A" was centered around an image of Brockman's head and did not mention the Monkees, while "Campaign B" was centered around the group. The same image of Brockman also appeared in the film itself.

Rafelson commented that he and Nicholson were arrested at the New York City premiere for trying to put a Head sticker on a police officer's helmet as he mounted his horse.

Head was one of the first films to be advertised with an MPAA rating, with newspaper advertisements in New York daily papers on November 1, 1968, displaying a G rating.

In Philadelphia, the Monkees promoted the film through appearances on the WFIL-TV program Jerry's Place, hosted by Jerry Blavat, and WKBS-TV's The Hy Lit Show.

=== Reception ===
On November 13, Daily Variety reported the film had grossed $16,111 in its first five days of release in New York City, and had broken box office records at the two theaters where it was playing. Head was not a commercial success, as the film, being an antithesis of The Monkees sitcom, comprehensively demolished the group's carefully groomed public image and alienated their teenage fanbase, while the counterculture audience they had been reaching for rejected the Monkees' efforts out of hand. The film's lack of success also corresponded with a steep drop in the group's popularity as recording artists. The Head soundtrack peaked at number 45 on the Billboard Top LPs chart, and "Porpoise Song" charted at number 62 on the Billboard Hot 100. Raybert Productions ceased managing the Monkees in December 1968.

In her scathing review of the film, Renata Adler of The New York Times commented that Head "might be a film to see if you have been smoking grass, or if you like to scream at the Monkees, or if you are interested in what interests drifting heads and hysterical high-school girls." She added that the group "are most interesting for their lack of similarity to The Beatles. Going through ersatz Beatle songs, and jokes and motions, their complete lack of distinction of any kind ... makes their performance modest and almost brave."

Daily Variety was also harsh, stating that "Head is an extension of the ridiculous nonsense served up on the Screen Gems vid series that manufactured the Monkees and lasted two full seasons following the same format and, ostensibly, appealing to the same kind of audience." The review applauded Rafelson and Nicholson, saying that they "were wise not to attempt a firm storyline as the Monkees have established themselves in the art of the non sequitur and outrageous action. Giving them material they can handle is good thinking; asking them to achieve something more might have been a disaster."

On the review aggregator website Rotten Tomatoes, 71% of 21 critics' reviews are positive, with an average rating of 6.4/10.

Funicello said when she saw the film "it made no more sense to me than it ever had" when she read the script "but it was a challenging, offbeat role and I was happy to play it."

=== Home media ===
Head was released on videocassette by RCA/Columbia Pictures Home Video on September 19, 1986. The film was also released on Laserdisc, which reached number 7 on Billboard's Top Videodisks chart in December. In 1994, Rhino Records purchased the Monkees' video and audio catalog, including Head. According to Rhino's co-founder, Harold Bronson, the company purchased the rights from Rafelson and Schneider, who had recently acquired full ownership of the group's catalog, excluding TV distribution rights, in a settlement with Columbia Pictures' current owner Sony. Rhino Home Video released Head on VHS on January 25, 1995, and on DVD on July 21, 1998.

The film was released on Blu-ray by The Criterion Collection on November 23, 2010 as part of the America Lost and Found: The BBS Story box set. A DVD release of the box set followed on December 14. On July 8, 2016, Rhino released the film on Blu-ray as part of The Monkees: The Complete Series box set.

== Legacy ==
Head has developed a cult following. Leonard Maltin describes it as "delightfully plotless" and "well worth seeing", giving the film 3 out of 4 stars.

When asked by Rolling Stone magazine in March 2012 if he thought making Head was a mistake, Nesmith responded by saying that "by the time Head came out the Monkees were a pariah. There was no confusion about this. We were on the cosine of the line of approbation, from acceptance to rejection...and it was over. Head was a swan song. We wrote it with Jack and Bob...and we liked it. It was an authentic representation of a phenomenon we were a part of that was winding down. It was very far from suicide even though it may have looked like that.."

They had their mind on other things; namely, financing Easy Rider (then called The Loners). They opened Head quietly, hoping that the film would balloon from word-of-mouth. It’s difficult to spread the word about a film that has no point. Regardless, the plan was not far-fetched: with unsquandered Monkees dough, Raybert backed Easy Rider and convinced a disdainful Columbia to distribute it.

A decade earlier, in his commentary for the television series episode "Fairy Tale", Nesmith called the film the "murder" of the Monkees, an intentional move by Schneider and Rafelson, who had their eyes on bigger goals and felt that the Monkees project was holding them back. Tork echoed a similar statement during the Monkees' 2001 interview on the VH-1 series Behind the Music. In 2001, Davy Jones said the Monkees should never have made the movie. In the 2005 book The Monkees: The Day-by-Day Story of the 60s TV Pop Sensation, Jones said of the film, "I was proud to be involved with such good people as Bob Rafelson and Jack Nicholson. If I were making a movie, that wouldn't be the movie I would make, but there's only a certain amount of things you can do with a group of four." Tork said he believed the film was a reflection of Rafelson's "low view of life", but also stated, "It was great to break loose. There's some awfully funny stuff in it, some brilliant scenes. The movie is not pure bad by any stretch. It's just that finally the point of it is pretty grim. 'Nobody gets out of here alive' is the point of the movie."

For all of the negative remarks, there have been positive comments, showing Dolenz, whether knowingly or unknowingly, as a fashion trendsetter. In Straight Outta Cullompton, author Adam Foley wrote more glowingly, "Julian [Hewings]: 'I was watching Head, The Monkees film, and there's a bit at the beginning when Micky Dolenz falls from Golden Gate Bridge and he's got a pair of slightly flared boot cut jean cords on with a pair of (Adidas) Gazelles, probably the first ones that ever came out and this stripy t-shirt and I thought "Wow, that's what I remember when I was a kid – that's what everyone used to wear when they went to school." I just thought "Wow. Yeah. That's really speaking to me there and I got the others together" and went "Have a look at this, we're going to go out and find these clothes and that's what we're going to wear". The look came first before the music'".

On November 19, 2014, the film was screened in the United Kingdom for the first time outside London as part of the Leeds International Film Festival. It was introduced by Peter Mills of Leeds Beckett University, author of a book about the Monkees.

The NorthEast ComicCon & Collectibles Extravaganza hosted a 50th anniversary screening of the film at the Regent Theatre (Arlington, Massachusetts), on July 6, 2018. A portion of that screening benefited the Cystic Dreams Fund a 501(c)(3) non-profit organization. Dolenz conducted a lengthy question and answer before introducing the film.

== See also ==
- The Trip, a 1967 film also written by Nicholson
- List of American films of 1968
- List of cult films
