= The Monkees: The Day-by-Day Story of the 60s TV Pop Sensation =

- Author: Andrew Sandoval
- Publisher: Thunder Bay Press
- Publication date: June 10, 2005
- Pages: 288
- ISBN: 1-59223-372-4

The Monkees: The Day-by-Day Story of the 60s TV Pop Sensation is a 2005 book written by Andrew Sandoval. The book fully details The Monkees' recording sessions, filming dates and public appearances from 1965-1970. It also contains an extensive listing of session musicians who worked on the Monkees' recordings.

== 2021 edition ==
In June 2021, Sandoval published a newly rewritten and expanded second version of the book, The Monkees: The Day-by-Day Story, through his imprint Beatland Books.
