= The Birds, the Bees & the Monkees =

Studio album by the Monkees
- Released: April 22, 1968
- Recorded: June 14, 1967 – March 14, 1968
- Studios: Western Recorders, No. 2 (Hollywood); RCA Victor (Hollywood); RCA Victor (Nashville); United Recorders (Hollywood)
- Genre: Pop rock
- Length: 37:00
- Label: Colgems
- Producers: The Monkees, Chip Douglas

The Monkees chronology
Pisces, Aquarius, Capricorn & Jones Ltd. (1967)	The Birds, the Bees & the Monkees (1968)	Head (1968)

Singles from The Birds, The Bees & The Monkees
- 1. "Daydream Believer" / "Goin' Down" Released: October 25, 1967; 2. "Valleri" / "Tapioca Tundra" Released: February 17, 1968

Professional ratings
Review scores
Source	Rating
AllMusic	3/5 stars
MusicHound	2.5/5 stars
popdose	(favorable)
Record Collector	5/5 stars
The Rolling Stone Album Guide	1.5/5 stars

The Birds, the Bees & the Monkees is the fifth studio album by the American pop rock band the Monkees, released in 1968 by Colgems Records. It was the first album released after the cancellation of their TV show and subsequently was their first not to reach No. 1 on the U.S. Billboard 200, peaking at No. 3, and their first not to chart in the UK, with their four previous efforts all having reached the top ten. The album has sold over a million copies.

== Background ==
In 1968, the Monkees faced a number of professional setbacks. Their television series, The Monkees, was canceled; their debut feature film, Head, performed poorly at the box office; and founding member Peter Tork departed the group in December of that year. Despite these challenges, the band released The Birds, The Bees & The Monkees, which produced two successful singles: "Daydream Believer", written by John Stewart, which reached No. 1 on the Billboard Hot 100, and "Valleri," which became the group's sixth million-selling single. The B-side to "Valleri," titled "Tapioca Tundra," written by Michael Nesmith, spent six weeks on the Billboard Hot 100, peaking at No. 34 in late March 1968.

Following their 1967 albums Headquarters and Pisces, Aquarius, Capricorn & Jones Ltd., the Monkees had gained creative control over their music and were permitted to play their own instruments in the studio. This shift helped counter earlier criticism that the band was merely a manufactured pop act lacking musical credibility. However, after the release of Pisces, the group's collaborative studio dynamic began to dissolve. Each member increasingly recorded his own material independently, using different producers, musicians, and studios.

Producer Chip Douglas, who had overseen the band's previous two albums, noted that the group's collaborative spirit declined during this period, with each member expressing a preference to work independently. Although all album tracks except "Daydream Believer" were credited as "Produced by the Monkees," many sessions were in fact supervised by others, including Colgems Records president Lester Sill, jazz arranger Shorty Rogers, and future MCA executive Brendan Cahill. According to Rogers, while the band retained formal producer credit per contractual agreement, much of the technical and organizational production work was carried out by the aforementioned staff.

The Birds, The Bees & The Monkees reflected the members' individual musical preferences. Davy Jones contributed songs in a Broadway pop style; Michael Nesmith explored country rock and psychedelic elements; and Micky Dolenz drew on soul and rock influences. Though Peter Tork submitted several compositions for the album, none were included in the final release. His sole contribution was playing piano on "Daydream Believer."

Songwriters Tommy Boyce and Bobby Hart, who had previously contributed to the group's early hits, returned to contribute two songs: a revised version of "Valleri" and the psychedelic "P.O. Box 9847."

== Cover artwork ==
The front cover of The Birds, The Bees & The Monkees features a shadow box containing various nostalgic items from the 1940s to the 1960s. Included are a plastic Cootie bug, a popgun, a folding paper fan shaped like a flower, ceramic birds, and a combination of paper and stick flowers, which were popular in 1968. The cover was designed by the agency of Alan Wolsky, who placed a photograph of himself in the bottom center compartment of the shadow box, partially obscured by paper flowers.

The back cover contains several personalized elements. One is the acronym "MIJACOGEO," located near Micky Dolenz's photo, which represents the names of Dolenz's family members: Micky, Janelle, Coco, and George. Davy Jones and Peter Tork signed their back cover portraits in a conventional manner, while Michael Nesmith included the inscription "Carlisle Wheeling" on his image. At the time, this was the title of an unreleased song that was not included on any Monkees album. The song was later re-recorded and released under the title "Conversations" on Nesmith's 1970 solo album Loose Salute with The First National Band, and it has also appeared on several Monkees compilation albums featuring rarities.

== Release history ==
The Birds, the Bees & the Monkees was released in the U.S. on April 22, 1968, in both stereo and mono formats. The U.S. mono edition was pressed in limited quantities, as mono LPs were being phased out, and it has since become a highly sought-after collector's item due to its dedicated mixes that differ from the stereo versions. Mono pressings from Australia, India, Israel, Mexico, and Puerto Rico are known to use the same dedicated mix as the U.S. mono release, while most other countries' mono editions, including the United Kingdom, were fold-down mixes in which the stereo channels were combined into a single monaural track. In Canada, RCA Victor issued the album in April 1968, using the same catalogue numbers. The Canadian mono edition was a fold-down of the stereo mix rather than a unique mix. The UK release followed on July 5, 1968, through RCA Victor. As with Canada, the UK mono LP was a fold-down of the stereo version and did not feature the U.S. dedicated mono mixes.

On February 8, 2010, Rhino Records' Rhino Handmade imprint issued a three-CD boxed set reissue of the album, sold exclusively online. The set included the original stereo and U.S. mono versions in miniature replica sleeves, more than 60 demos, rehearsals, and outtakes from the 1968 sessions, a commemorative pin, and a booklet of essays and session notes by Monkees historian Andrew Sandoval. The first 1,000 orders included a bonus vinyl single featuring previously unreleased acoustic versions of "St. Matthew" and "Lady's Baby."

The U.S. mono mix was again reissued in October 2014 by Friday Music as part of The Monkees in Mono vinyl box set. This edition featured etchings in the runout grooves, reading "Thanks to the Monkees" on side one and "In memory of Davy Jones" on side two.

== Track listing ==
Side one
No.	Title	Writer(s)	Lead vocals	Length
1.	"Dream World"	David Jones; Steve Pitts	Jones	3:22
2.	"Auntie's Municipal Court"	Michael Nesmith; Keith Allison	Micky Dolenz	4:05
3.	"We Were Made for Each Other"	Carole Bayer; George Fischoff	Jones	2:25
4.	"Tapioca Tundra"	Nesmith	Nesmith	3:08
5.	"Daydream Believer"	John Stewart	Jones	3:00
6.	"Writing Wrongs"	Nesmith	Nesmith	5:08

Side two
No.	Title	Writer(s)	Lead vocals	Length
1.	"I'll Be Back Up on My Feet"	Sandy Linzer; Denny Randell	Dolenz	2:26
2.	"The Poster"	Jones; Pitts	Jones	2:21
3.	"P.O. Box 9847"	Tommy Boyce · Bobby Hart	Dolenz	3:16
4.	"Magnolia Simms"	Nesmith	Nesmith	3:48
5.	"Valleri"	Boyce; Hart	Jones	2:15
6.	"Zor and Zam"	Bill Chadwick; John Chadwick	Dolenz	2:10

=== Aborted track listing ===
The original track lineup for the album, compiled in March 1968, included the following songs:

Side one

1. "Through the Looking Glass"
2. "We Were Made for Each Other"
3. "Writing Wrongs"
4. "I'll Be Back Up on My Feet"
5. "Valleri"
6. "Long Title: Do I Have to Do This All Over Again"

Side two

1. "Dream World"
2. "P.O. Box 9847"
3. "Tapioca Tundra"
4. "The Poster"
5. "Alvin"
6. "Daydream Believer"
7. "Zor and Zam"

== Personnel ==
Credits adapted from Rhino Handmade 2010 "Deluxe Edition" box set.

The Monkees

- Davy Jones – vocals (1, 3, 5, 8, 11)
- Micky Dolenz – vocals (2, 7, 9, 12), backing vocal harmony (5), percussion (12)
- Michael Nesmith – harmony vocals (2), guitar (2, 4–6, 10), percussion (2, 4), vocals (4, 6, 10), keyboards (6)
- Peter Tork – piano (5)

Additional musicians

- Mike Deasy – guitar (1, 3, 7–8)
- Al Hendrickson – guitar (1, 3)
- Gerry McGee – guitar (1, 3, 9, 11)
- Don Randi – harpsichord (1), organ (8)
- Max Bennett – bass guitar (1, 3, 7, 10, 12)
- Earl Palmer – drums (1, 3, 7, 10)
- George Kast – violin (1, 3, 5, 8, 12)
- Sam Freed – violin (1, 3)
- Nathan Kaproff – violin (1, 3, 5, 8, 12)
- Marvin Limonick – violin (1, 3, 8)
- Alexander Murray – violin (1, 3, 5, 8, 12)
- Erno Neufeld – violin (1, 3, 5, 8, 12)
- Marie Fera – cello (1, 3)
- Edgar Lustgarten – cello (1)
- Jacquelyn Lustgarten – cello (1, 3)
- Fredrick Seykora – cello (1)
- Buddy Childers – trumpet (1, 3, 7–8, 12)
- Jack Sheldon – trumpet (1, 3, 8, 12)
- George Roberts – trombone (1)
- John Cave – horn (1)
- David Duke – horn (1, 3)
- Arthur Maebe – horn (1)
- Keith Allison – guitar (2, 12), background vocals (2)
- Bill Chadwick – guitar (2, 12), background vocals (2)
- Rick Dey – bass guitar (2, 6, 12)
- Eddie Hoh – drums (2, 4–6, 12), percussion (6, 12)
- James Burton – guitar (3)
- Michael Melvoin – harpsichord (3, 7), piano (12)
- Kurt Reher – cello (3)
- Eleanor Slatkin – cello (3)
- Lewis McCreary – trombone (3, 7–8, 10–12)
- Vincent DeRosa – horn (3)
- Richard Perissi – horn (3)
- Chip Douglas – bass guitar (5, 12), percussion (5), piano (5)
- Bill Martin – percussion (5)
- Pete Candoli – trumpet (5)
- Al Porcino – trumpet (5)
- Manny Stevens – trumpet (5), piccolo trumpet (5)
- Richard Noel – trombone (5)
- Richard Leith – bass trombone (5), trombone (8, 12)
- Philip Teele – bass trombone (5)
- Dennis Budimir – guitar (7)
- Al Casey – guitar (7–8)
- Milt Holland – percussion (7, 12), mallets (1), drums (12)
- Stan Levey – percussion (7, 12), drums (12)
- Bill Hood – sax (7)
- Ollie Mitchell – trumpet (7, 10–11)
- Lou Blackburn – trombone (7)
- Howard Roberts – guitar (8)
- Lyle Ritz – bass guitar (8)
- Hal Blaine – drums (8, 12), percussion (12)
- Gary Coleman – percussion (8), mallets (8)
- Gene Estes – percussion (8), mallets (8)
- Clyde Reasinger – trumpet (8, 12)
- Tony Terran – trumpet (8, 12)
- Milt Bernhart – trombone (8, 12)
- Frank Rosolino – trombone (8, 12)
- John Lowe – sax (8, 12), woodwind (8)
- Ambrose Russo – violin (8, 12)
- Louis Shelton – guitar (9, 11)
- Joe Osborn – bass guitar (9, 11)
- Bobby Hart – tack piano (9)
- Billy Lewis – drums (9, 11), percussion (9), tambourine (11)
- Victor Arno – violin (9)
- Jack Pepper – violin (9)
- Philip Goldberg – viola (9)
- Ray Kelley – cello (9)
- Paul T. Smith – tack piano (10)
- Jim Horn – sax (10–11)
- Jack Nimitz – baritone sax (10)
- Jay Migliori – sax (11)
- Roy Caton – trumpet (11)

Unconfirmed personnel and duties

- Milt Holland or Jerry Williams – tambourine (1)
- Harry Nilsson – unknown (2)
- Other instruments (4)
- Additional backing vocals (7–9, 11)
- Tabla, marxophone, handclaps (9)
- Henry Diltz – unknown (12)

Technical

- The Monkees – producers
- Chip Douglas – producer
- Henry Lewy – recording engineer
- Hank Cicalo – recording engineer
- Pete Abbott – recording engineer
- Shorty Rogers – arranger (1, 3, 5, 7–8, 10, 12)
- Don McGinnis – string arrangement (9), horn arrangement (11)
- Lester Sill – music supervisor
- Alan Wolsky & Friends – cover design

== Charts ==
=== Album ===
Chart (1968)	Peak position
Australian Albums (Kent Music Report)	5
Canadian Albums (RPM)	6
Finnish Albums (Suomen virallinen lista)	8
German Albums (Offizielle Top 100)	28
Japanese Albums (Oricon)	44
US Billboard 200	3

=== Singles ===
Year	Single	Chart	Peak position
1967	"Daydream Believer"	Billboard Hot 100	1
1967	"Daydream Believer"	UK Charts	5
1968	"Valleri"	Billboard Hot 100	3
1968	"Valleri"	UK Charts	12
1968	"Tapioca Tundra"	Billboard Hot 100	34

== Certifications ==
Region	Certification	Certified units/sales
United States (RIAA)	Platinum	1,000,000^{^}
^{^} Shipments figures based on certification alone.
