= The Monkees =

American pop rock band

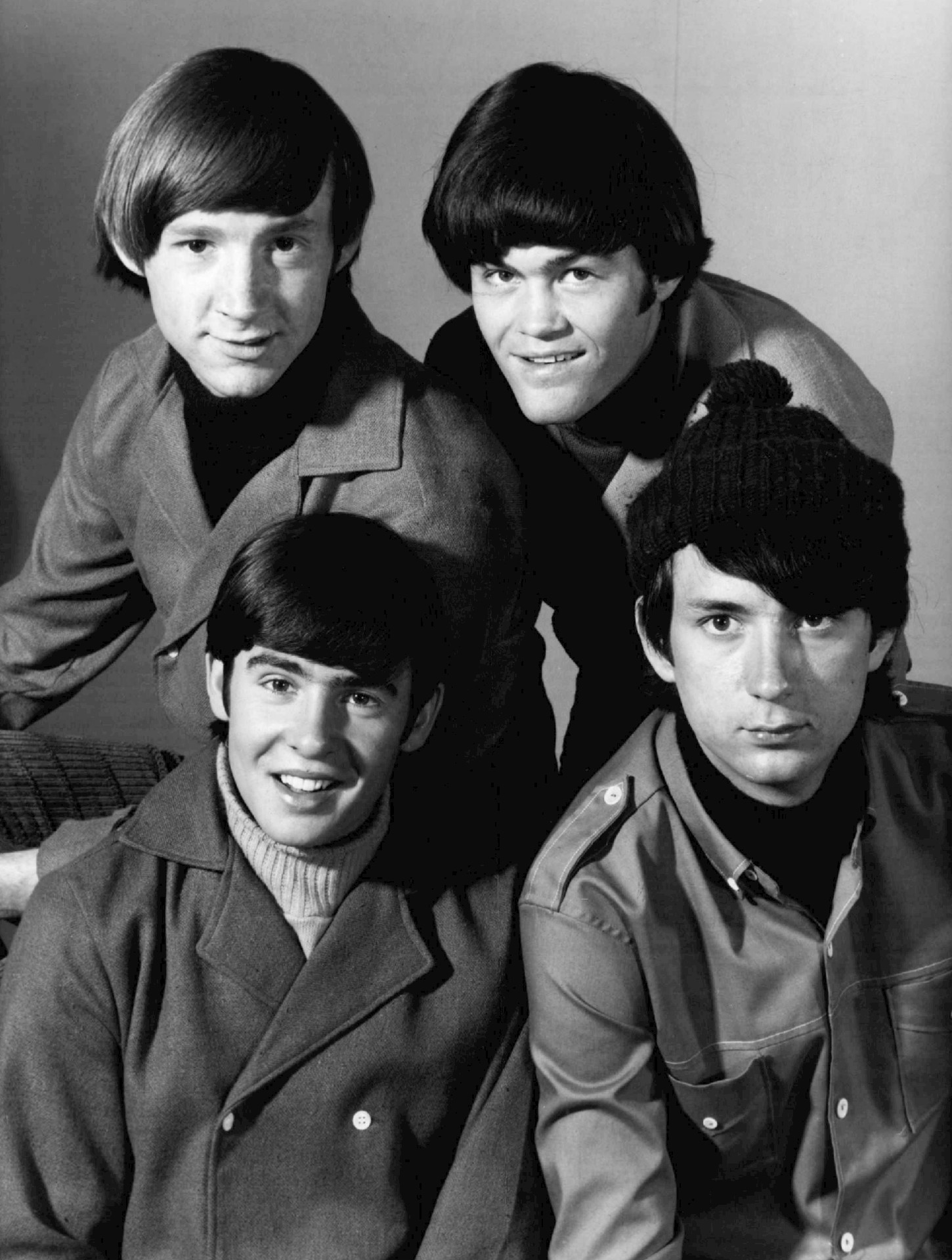
- The Monkees in 1966; Clockwise from top left: Peter Tork, Micky Dolenz, Michael Nesmith, Davy Jones.

Background information
- Origin: Los Angeles, California, U.S.
- Genres: Pop rock; rock; psychedelia
- Years active: 1966–1970 (Note: Sources differ as to dates for the official formation (possibly 1965) and disbandment (possibly 1971) of the band. However, virtually all reliable sources agree that until the Monkees' reunions, there was no active involvement by the members outside of the period from 1966 to 1970.); 1986–1989; 1996–1997; 2001–2002; 2010–2021
- Labels: Colgems; RCA Victor; Bell; Arista; Rhino
- Past members: Micky Dolenz; Michael Nesmith; Peter Tork; Davy Jones
- Website: monkees.com

The Monkees were an American pop rock band, formed in Los Angeles in the mid-1960s, whose lineup consisted of Micky Dolenz, Davy Jones, Michael Nesmith, and Peter Tork. One of the most commercially successful bands of the late 1960s, the group was conceived in 1965 by television producers Bob Rafelson and Bert Schneider for the NBC situation comedy series of the same name. Music credited to the band was released on LP, as well as being included in the show, which aired from 1966 to 1968.

At first, the band members' musical contributions were primarily limited to lead vocals and the occasional composition; the remainder was composed by professional songwriters and performed by session musicians such as the Wrecking Crew, under the music supervision of Don Kirshner and with production by figures including Boyce and Hart, Jack Keller, and Jeff Barry. From 1966 to 1967, the group enjoyed a consecutive run of four chart-topping albums: The Monkees, More of the Monkees, Headquarters, and Pisces, Aquarius, Capricorn & Jones Ltd.. During this period, they also achieved three number-one singles: "Last Train to Clarksville", "I'm a Believer", and "Daydream Believer".

The members had increasingly desired greater control over the creation of their music and, following a brief power struggle, gained full control over their recordings in 1967. Starting with Headquarters, they worked with producer Chip Douglas and mostly performed as a group; however, by the recording of The Birds, The Bees & The Monkees, each member was pursuing his own interests under the Monkees' name. In 1968, they starred as themselves in the motion picture Head, planned as the antithesis of the television show, but received with an underwhelming critical and commercial reception. With much of the public under the misconception that the band members still did not play their own instruments—followed by the cancellation of the television series and waning popularity overall—the group broke up in the early 1970s.

A revival of interest in the television show came in 1986, leading to intermittent reunions from then until 2011, including reunion tours, a major-network television special, and new studio albums. After the deaths of Jones in 2012 and Tork in 2019, Dolenz and Nesmith undertook a farewell tour in 2021. This tour concluded shortly before Nesmith's death later that year, leaving Dolenz as the sole surviving member.

== History ==
=== Conception and casting ===
The Monkees were formed in the mid-1960s in Los Angeles.

Davy Jones has said: "The name hadn't been thought of yet. There was The Beatles, The Animals, The Byrds, The Turtles — so we started thinking of animal names ... Suddenly, we knew we had it – The Monkees' [spelled] wrong, like Beatles, Byrds".

Aspiring filmmaker Bob Rafelson developed the initial idea for The Monkees in 1962 and tried selling it to Revue Productions, the television division of Universal Pictures, but was unsuccessful. In May 1964, while working at Screen Gems, Rafelson teamed up with Bert Schneider, whose father, Abraham Schneider, headed the Colpix Records and Screen Gems Television units of Columbia Pictures. Rafelson and Schneider ultimately formed Raybert Productions. The Beatles' films A Hard Day's Night and Help! inspired Rafelson and Schneider to revive Rafelson's idea for The Monkees. As Raybert Productions, they sold the show to Screen Gems Television in April 1965.

Rafelson and Schneider's original idea was to cast an existing New York folk rock group, the Lovin' Spoonful, who were not widely known at the time. After those plans fell through, Rafelson and Schneider focused on Davy Jones. In September 1964, Jones had signed to a long-term contract to appear in TV programs for Screen Gems, to make feature films for Columbia Pictures and to record music for the Colpix label. His involvement with The Monkees was publicly announced on July 14, 1965. Jones had previously starred as the Artful Dodger in the Broadway theater show Oliver!. For this work he was nominated for a Tony Award for Best Featured Actor in a Musical in 1963.

In September 1965, Daily Variety and The Hollywood Reporter ran advertisements to cast the remainder of the band/cast members for the TV show. The advertisements each read as follows:

Madness!! Auditions. Folk & Roll Musicians-Singers for acting roles in new TV series. Running parts for 4 insane boys, age 17–21. Want spirited Ben Frank's-types. Have courage to work. Must come down for interview.

Out of 437 applicants, the other three chosen for the cast of the show were Michael Nesmith, Peter Tork, and Micky Dolenz.

Dolenz, son of screen actor George Dolenz, had prior screen experience under the name "Mickey Braddock" as the 10-year-old star of the Circus Boy series in the 1950s. He was actively auditioning for pilots at the time and was told about the Raybert project by his agent.

Nesmith had served a brief stint in the U.S. Air Force and had also recorded for Colpix under the name "Michael Blessing". He was the only one of The Monkees who had come for the audition based on seeing the trade magazine ad. He showed up to the audition with his laundry and impressed Rafelson and Schneider with his laid-back style and droll sense of humor. He also wore a woollen hat to keep his hair out of his eyes when he rode his motorcycle, leading to early promotional materials which nicknamed him "Wool Hat". The hat remained part of Nesmith's wardrobe, but the name was dropped after the pilot.

Tork was recommended to Rafelson and Schneider by Stephen Stills at his own audition. Tork was a skilled multi-instrumentalist who had performed at various Greenwich Village folk clubs before moving west, where he worked as a busboy.

=== Early years ===
==== Developing the music for their debut album ====
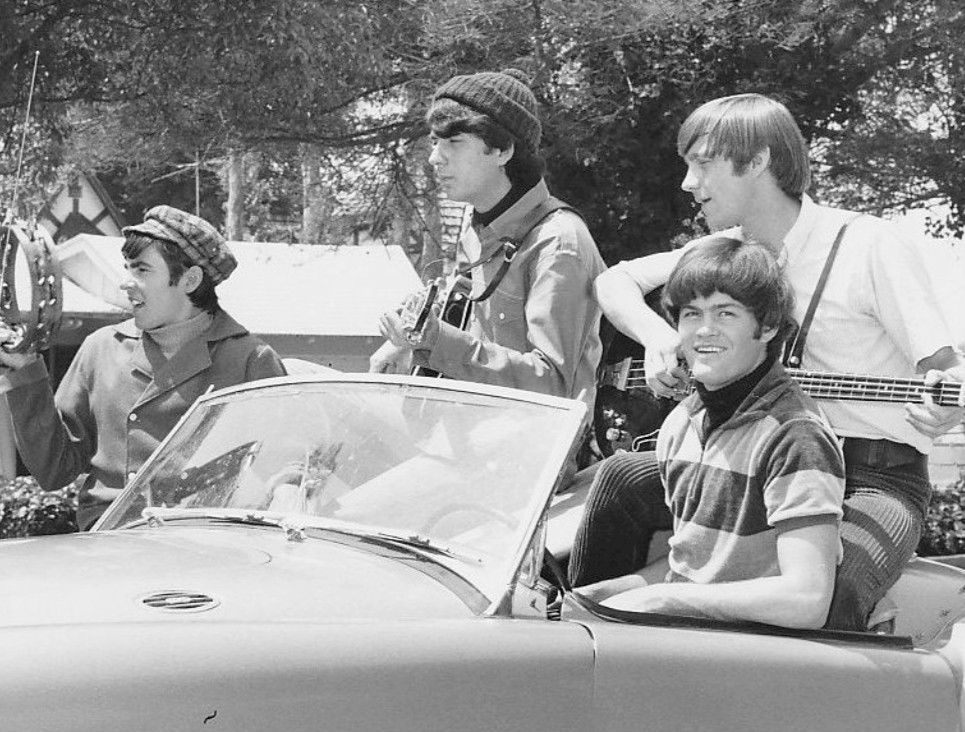
The Monkees in 1965

During the casting process, Don Kirshner, Screen Gems' head of music, was contacted to secure music for The Monkees pilot. Kirshner's Brill Building firm Aldon Music had an extensive portfolio of songwriters, many in need of work after the British Invasion had reorganized the American music scene; while several Aldon writers contributed songs to the Monkees during their existence, the bulk of the songwriting for the group fell upon Tommy Boyce and Bobby Hart, two songwriters who were only beginning to break through to success at the time. Boyce and Hart contributed four demo recordings for the pilot. NBC ordered 32 episodes of The Monkees on January 17, 1966.

When The Monkees was picked up as a series, development of the musical side of the project accelerated. Columbia–Screen Gems and RCA Victor entered into a joint venture called Colgems Records; the primary purpose of the venture was to distribute Monkees records. Raybert set up a rehearsal space and rented instruments for the group to practice playing in April 1966, but it quickly became apparent they would not be in shape in time for the series debut. The producers called upon Kirshner to recruit a producer for the Monkees' sessions.

Kirshner called on Snuff Garrett, composer of several hits by Gary Lewis & the Playboys, to produce the initial musical cuts for the show. Garrett, upon meeting the four Monkees in June 1966, decided that Jones would sing lead, a choice that was unpopular with the group. This cool reception led Kirshner to drop Garrett and buy out his contract.

Kirshner next allowed Nesmith to produce sessions, provided he did not play on any tracks he produced. Nesmith did, however, start using the other Monkees in his sessions; he especially used Tork as a guitarist. (Note: As Nesmith pointed out to Eric Lefcowitz in The Monkees' Tale, "I wasn't the only musician and I wasn't much of a musician. Peter was a better musician than I was by several orders of magnitude.") Kirshner came back to the enthusiastic Boyce and Hart to be the regular producers, but he brought in one of his top East Coast associates, Jack Keller, to lend some production experience to the sessions. Boyce and Hart quickly realized that when together, the four actors fooled around and tried to crack each other up. Because of this, the producers often brought in each singer individually.

The Monkees' first two albums were meant to be a soundtrack to the first season of the TV show, to cash in on the audience. In the 2006 Rhino Deluxe Edition re-issue of their second album, More of the Monkees, Nesmith stated that he was angered by the release of the first album because it portrayed the band as an actual rock-and-roll band and gave no credit to the other musicians involved in the project.

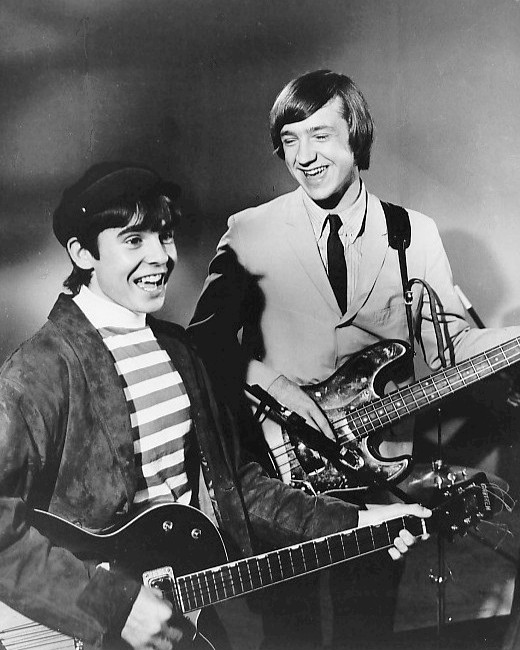
Davy Jones and Peter Tork in 1966

The Monkees' first single, "Last Train to Clarksville" b/w "Take a Giant Step", was released in August 1966, just weeks prior to the TV broadcast debut. In conjunction with the first broadcast of the television show on September 12, 1966, NBC and Columbia had a major hit on their hands. The single topped the Billboard Hot 100 for the week ending November 5, 1966. The Monkees' debut album, The Monkees, was released a month later; it spent 13 weeks at No. 1 and stayed on the Billboard charts for 78 weeks. Twenty years later, during their reunion, it spent another 24 weeks on the Billboard charts.

==== Live performances and touring ====
Pleased with their initial efforts, Columbia (over Kirshner's objections) planned to send the Monkees out to play live concerts. The massive success of the series and its spin-off records created intense pressure to mount a touring version of the group. Against the initial wishes of the producers, the band went out on the road and made their debut performance in December 1966 in Hawaii.

The results of these live performances were far better than expected. Wherever they went, the group was greeted by scenes of fan adulation reminiscent of Beatlemania. This gave the singers increased confidence in their fight for control over the musical material chosen for the series.

=== Independence ===
==== Conflict with Kirshner and More of the Monkees ====
In early 1967, controversy concerning the Monkees' studio abilities arose. Dolenz told a reporter that the Wrecking Crew provided the backing tracks for the first two Monkees albums, and that his position as drummer was simply because a Monkee had to learn to play the drums, and he only knew the guitar. In the January 28, 1967, issue of Saturday Evening Post an article quoted Nesmith railing against the music creation process. "Do you know how debilitating it is to sit up and have to duplicate somebody else's records?" he asked. "Tell the world we don't record our own music."

The band members were displeased that the music publishing company would not allow them to play their own instruments on their records or to use more of their own material. These complaints intensified when Kirshner moved recording from California to New York, leaving the band out of the musical process entirely until they were called upon to add their vocals to the completed tracks. Nesmith, when asked about the situation by Rolling Stone magazine, said, "The [TV show's] producers [in Hollywood] backed us and David went along. None of us could have fought the battles we did [with the music publishers] without the explicit support of the show's producers".

On January 16, 1967, the Monkees held their first recording session as a fully functioning, self-contained band. The band recorded an early version of Nesmith's self-composed top 40 hit single "The Girl I Knew Somewhere", along with "All of Your Toys" and "She's So Far Out, She's In".

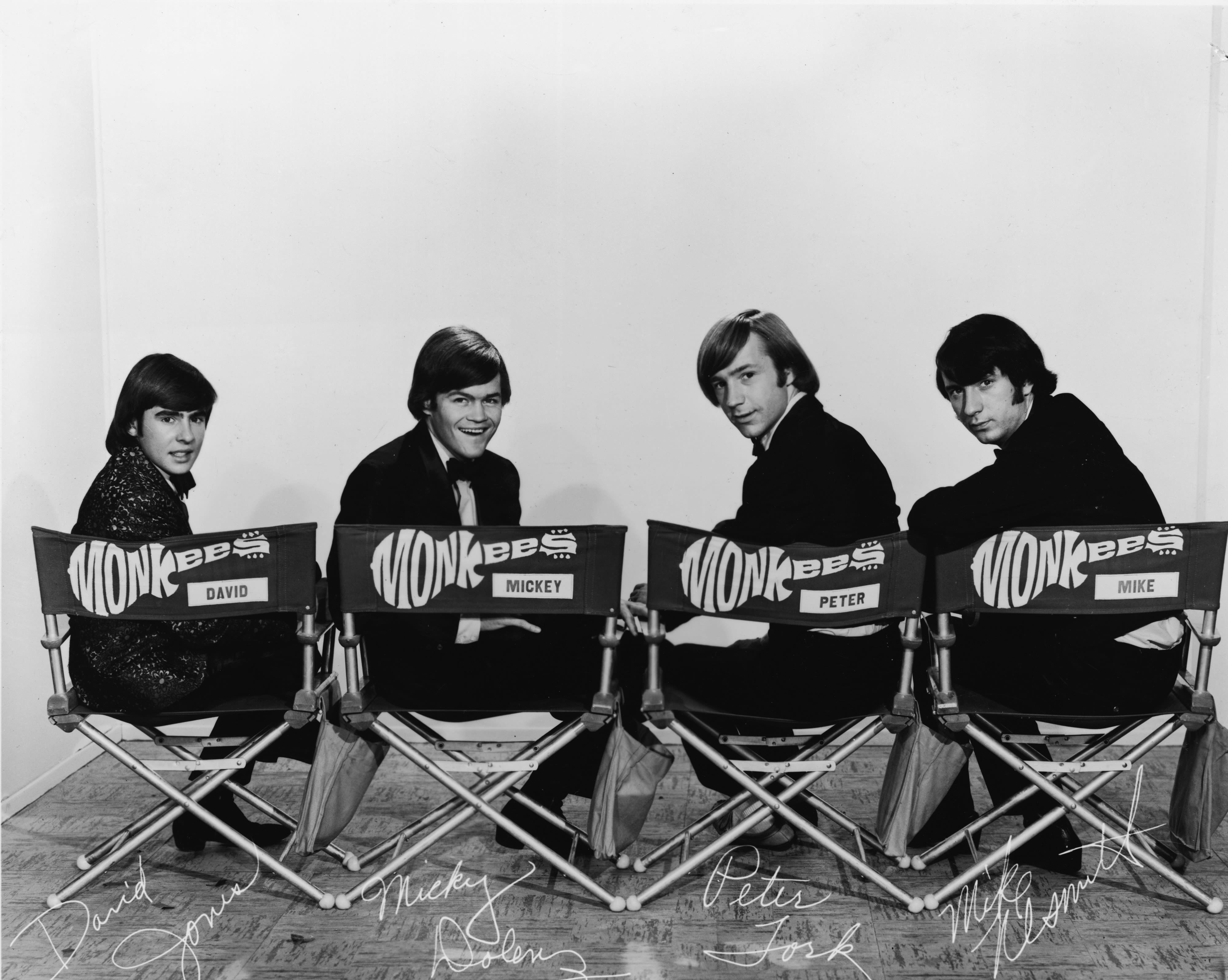
The Monkees' chairs

Also in January, Kirshner released the band's second album of songs that used session musicians, More of the Monkees, without the band's knowledge. The Monkees were annoyed at not having even been told of the release in advance, at having their opinions on the track selection ignored, and at Kirshner's self-congratulatory liner notes. The band was also displeased because of the cover photo, which was a composite of photographs taken for a J.C. Penney clothing advertisement. Indeed, the Monkees were not even given a copy of the album; they had to buy it from a record store.

The climax of the conflict between Kirshner and the band was an intense argument among Nesmith, Kirshner and Colgems lawyer Herb Moelis, which took place at the Beverly Hills Hotel in January 1967. Kirshner had presented the group with royalty checks and gold records. Nesmith had responded with an ultimatum, demanding a change in the way the Monkees' music was chosen and recorded. Moelis reminded Nesmith that he was under contract. The confrontation ended with Nesmith punching a hole in a wall and saying, "That could have been your face!" However, each of the band members, including Nesmith, accepted the $250,000 royalty checks.

Colgems and the Monkees reached an agreement not to release material directly created by the group together with unrelated Kirshner-produced material. Kirshner violated this agreement in early February 1967 when he released "A Little Bit Me, A Little Bit You", composed and written by Neil Diamond, as a single with "She Hangs Out" as the B-side. Kirshner was then fired.

Propelled by the band's second single, "I'm a Believer" b/w "(I'm Not Your) Steppin' Stone", More of the Monkees became the band's biggest-selling LP. The album spent 70 weeks on the Billboard charts, staying No. 1 for 18 weeks and becoming the third-highest-selling album of the 1960s. "I'm a Believer" was written by Neil Diamond. The Monkees' recording of the single held the number-one spot on the U.S. Billboard Hot 100 for seven weeks. "I'm a Believer" became the biggest-selling single for all of 1967.

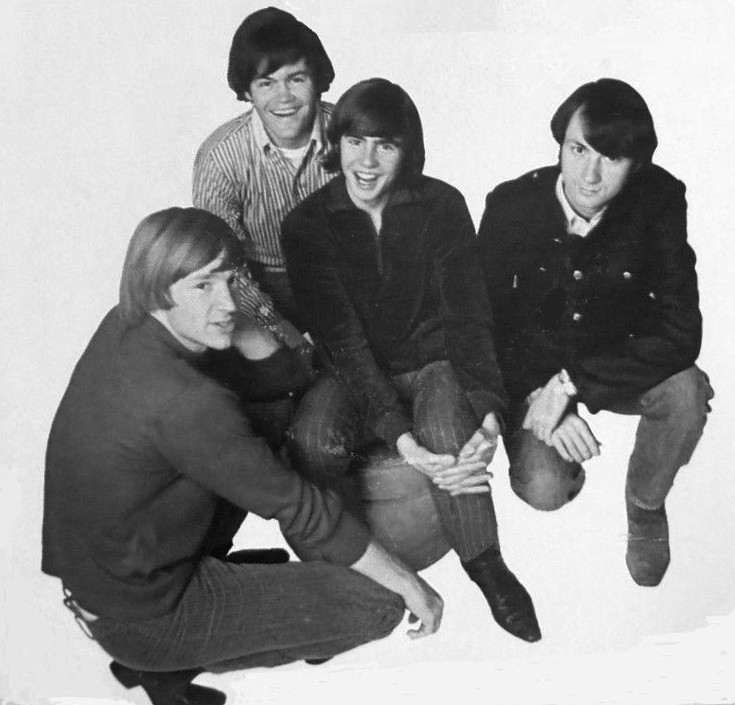
Publicity shot in 1967

The Monkees' UK tour in 1967 received a chilly reception; the front pages of several UK and international music papers proclaimed that the group members did not always play their own instruments or sing the backing vocals in the studio. They were derisively dubbed the "Pre-Fab Four" and the Sunday Mirror called them a "disgrace to the pop world". However, George Harrison praised the Monkees' self-produced musical attempts. Peter Tork was later one of the musicians on Harrison's album Wonderwall Music, playing Paul McCartney's five-string banjo. Nesmith attended the Beatles' recording session for "A Day in the Life" at Abbey Road Studios. At that time, he reportedly asked John Lennon, "Do you think we're a cheap imitation of the Beatles, your movies and your records?" Lennon replied, "I think you're the greatest comic talent since the Marx Brothers. I've never missed one of your programs."

==== Headquarters and Pisces, Aquarius, Capricorn & Jones Ltd. ====
In March 1967, "The Girl I Knew Somewhere", written by Nesmith and performed by Dolenz, Nesmith, Tork, and bassist John London, was released as the B-side to "A Little Bit Me, a Little Bit You". The A-side peaked at No. 2 on the charts, while the B-side reached No. 39.

Following the dismissal of Kirshner, Nesmith hired Chip Douglas to produce the Monkees' next album, Headquarters. Released in May 1967, Headquarters contained no U.S. singles but became the Monkees' third consecutive No. 1 album. With a country-folk-rock sound, the album reflected a departure from the pop style of their earlier works under Kirshner. According to Andrew Sandoval, the album topped the charts on May 24, 1967, but was displaced by the Beatles' Sgt. Pepper's Lonely Hearts Club Band the following week, holding the No. 2 spot for 11 weeks during the "Summer of Love". The track "Randy Scouse Git", written and sung by Dolenz, was released internationally as "Alternate Title" (owing to the controversial nature of its original title) and became a hit, reaching No. 2 in the UK and Norway.

Tork's "For Pete's Sake" was used as the closing theme for the Monkees' television show. Nesmith contributed songs like "Sunny Girlfriend", incorporating pedal steel guitar, and "You Told Me", with a banjo intro by Tork that parodied the Beatles' "Taxman". Other notable tracks included "You Just May Be the One", "Shades of Gray", "Forget that Girl", and "No Time". The band wrote six of the album's 12 tracks, along with two experimental pieces, "Band 6" and "Zilch".

The Los Angeles Times praised the album, stating, "The Monkees Upgrade Album Quality" and "The Monkees are getting better. Headquarters has more interesting songs and a better quality level [than previous albums]. None of the tracks is a throwaway. The improvement trend is laudable."

The collaborative approach on Headquarters was short-lived. Nesmith later commented:

Everybody in the press and in the hippie movement had got us into their target window as being illegitimate and not worthy of consideration as a musical force (or) certainly any kind of cultural force. We were under siege; wherever we went there was such resentment for us. We were constantly mocked and humiliated by the press. Really gettin' beat up pretty good. We all knew what was going on inside. Kirshner had been purged. We'd gone to try to make Headquarters and found out that it was only marginally okay and that our better move was to just go back to the original songwriting and song-making strategy of the first albums except with a clear indication of how (the music) came to be. The rabid element and the hatred that was engendered is almost impossible to describe. It lingers to this day among people my own age.

Tork disagreed with Nesmith's assessment of Headquarters, stating, "I don't think the Pisces album was as groovy to listen to as Headquarters. Technically it was much better, but I think it suffers for that reason." Tork favored working as a unified band, but Dolenz soon lost interest in drumming. "Dolenz was 'incapable of repeating a triumph,'" Tork commented in a DVD release of the second season of the television show. Producer Chip Douglas noted Dolenz's drumming required extensive editing, calling it "shaky".

Pisces, Aquarius, Capricorn & Jones Ltd. was their fourth consecutive No. 1 album, holding the top spot for five weeks. The album featured hits like "Pleasant Valley Sunday" (No. 3) and "Words" (No. 11). It also included early use of the Moog synthesizer on tracks like "Daily Nightly" and "Star Collector". Nesmith's "What Am I Doing Hangin' 'Round?" became a milestone in the development of country-rock. Nesmith reflected, "One of the things that I really felt was honest was country-rock. I wanted to move the Monkees more into that because if we get closer to country music, we'll get closer to blues, and country blues, and so forth. It had a lot of un-country things in it: a familiar change from a I major to a VI minor—those kinds of things. So it was a little kind of a new wave country song. It didn't sound like the country songs of the time, which was Buck Owens."

Their next single, "Daydream Believer", with a piano intro by Tork, reached No. 1. Its B-side, "Goin' Down", featured Nesmith and Tork on guitars and Dolenz on lead vocals. The Monkees simultaneously held No. 1 positions on the singles and album charts.

Both Headquarters and Pisces, Aquarius, Capricorn & Jones Ltd. returned to the charts during the Monkees' 1986 reunion, remaining there for 17 weeks.

==== The Birds, The Bees & The Monkees ====
No longer desiring to work as a group, the Monkees dropped Chip Douglas as a producer, and starting in November 1967, they largely produced their own sessions. Although production and performance of individual tracks were credited to the whole band, the songs were mostly solo efforts employing session musicians, with little or no group participation. In a couple of cases, Boyce and Hart had returned from the first two albums to produce, but credit was given to the Monkees due to contractual requirements.

Propelled by the hit singles "Daydream Believer" and "Valleri", along with Nesmith's self-penned top 40 hit "Tapioca Tundra", The Birds, The Bees & The Monkees reached No. 3 on the Billboard charts shortly after it was released in April 1968. It was the first album released after NBC announced they were not renewing The Monkees for a third season. The album cover, a quaint collage of items in a knickknack shelf, was chosen over the group's objections. It was the last Monkees' album to be released in separate, dedicated mono and stereo mixes. During the 1986 reunion, it returned to the Billboard charts for 11 weeks.

==== Beyond television and Head ====
The Monkees was cancelled in 1968.

Also in 1968, the Monkees starred in Head, an American satirical musical adventure film written and produced by Jack Nicholson and Bob Rafelson and directed by Rafelson.

The plot and peak moments of the film came together at an Ojai, California, resort where the Monkees, Rafelson, and Nicholson brainstormed into a tape recorder, reportedly with the aid of a quantity of marijuana. Nicholson then took the tapes and used them as the basis for his screenplay, which according to Rafelson he structured while under the influence of LSD. When the band learned that they would not be allowed to direct themselves or to receive screenwriting credit, Dolenz, Jones, and Nesmith staged a one-day walkout, leaving Tork the only Monkee on the set the first day. The strike ended after the first day when the studio agreed to a larger percentage share of the film's net for the group, but the incident damaged the Monkees' relationship with Rafelson and Bert Schneider and would effectively end their professional relationship with the producers.

The film was the antithesis of The Monkees television show. Rafelson and Nicholson's "Ditty Diego-War Chant" (recited at the start of the film by the group) ruthlessly parodies Boyce and Hart's "Monkees Theme". A sparse advertising campaign (with no mention of the Monkees) hurt any chances of the film doing well, and it played briefly in half-filled theaters. In the DVD commentary, Nesmith said that everyone associated with the Monkees "had gone crazy" by this time. They were each using the platform of the Monkees to push their own disparate career goals, to the detriment of the Monkees project. Nesmith added that Head was Rafelson and Nicholson's intentional effort to "kill" the Monkees, so that they would no longer be bothered with the matter.

A poor audience response at an August 1968 screening in Los Angeles forced the producers to edit the picture from its original 110-minute length. The 86-minute Head premiered in New York City on November 6, 1968; the film later debuted in Hollywood on November 20. It was not a commercial success. This was in part because Head comprehensively demolished the group's carefully groomed public image while the counterculture audience they had been reaching for rejected the Monkees' efforts out of hand. Receiving mixed critical reviews and virtually non-existent box office receipts, the film succeeded in alienating the band's teenage fanbase while failing to attract a more adult audience. Rafelson and Schneider severed all ties to the band amid the bitterness that ensued over the commercial failure of Head. At the time, Rafelson told the press, "I grooved on those four in very special ways while at the same time thinking they had absolutely no talent."

The film's soundtrack album reached No. 45 on the Billboard charts and No. 24 in Canada. PopMatters described Head as "a hypnogogic hallucination of a 60's pop record" whose composition encompassed musique concrète pieces and six new songs in the genres of psychedelic, Broadway and lo-fi rock.

The album had a mylar cover to give it a mirror-like appearance, so that the person looking at the cover would see his own head, a play on the album title Head. Peter Tork said, "That was something special... [Jack] Nicholson coordinated the record, made it up from the soundtrack. He made it different from the movie. There's a line in the movie where [Frank] Zappa says, 'That's pretty white.' Then there's another line in the movie that was not juxtaposed in the movie, but Nicholson put them together in the [soundtrack album], when Mike says, 'And the same thing goes for Christmas'... that's funny... very different from the movie... that was very important and wonderful that he assembled the record differently from the movie... It was a different artistic experience."

Released in October 1968, the single from the album, "The Porpoise Song", is a psychedelic pop song written by Goffin and King, with lead vocals from Dolenz and backing vocals from Jones. It reached No. 62 on the Billboard charts and No. 26 on the Canadian RPM charts.

Head developed a cult following. In 2013, Rolling Stone ranked the album at number 25 in their list of "The 25 Greatest Soundtracks of All Time".

=== Later years and separation ===
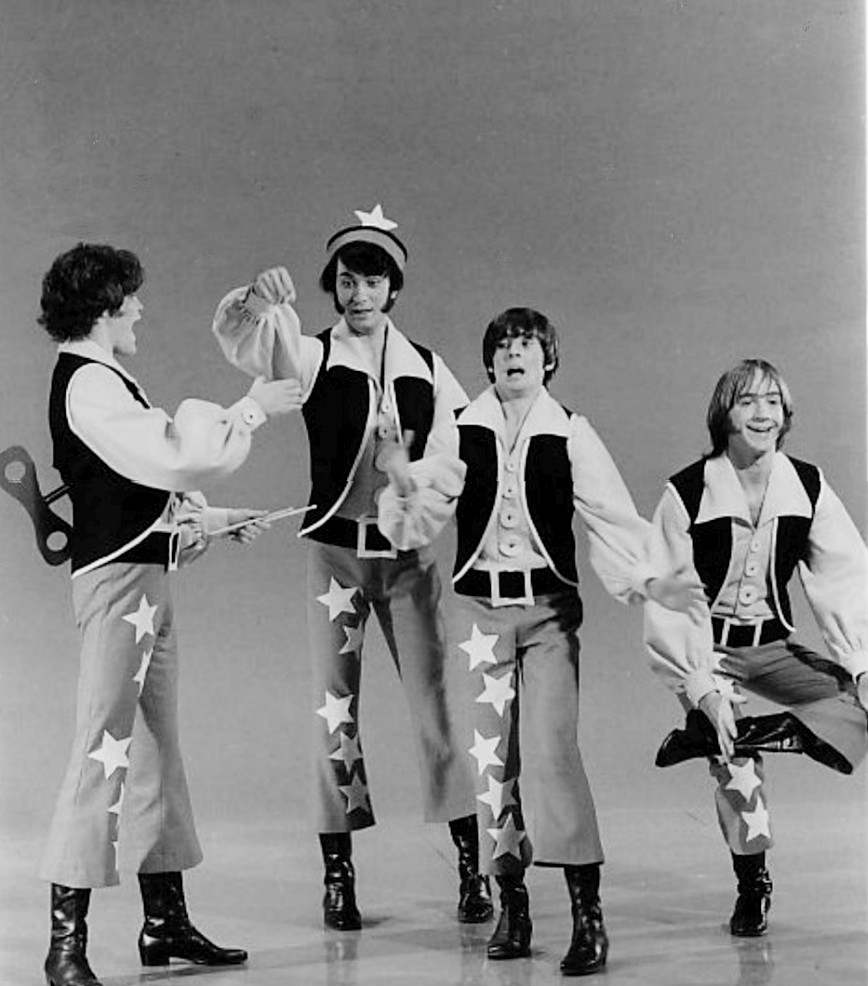
1969 television special 33 1/3 Revolutions Per Monkee

==== Tork's resignation, Instant Replay and The Monkees Present ====
Tensions within the group were increasing. Tork, citing exhaustion, quit the band by buying out the last four years of his Monkees contract at $150,000 per year. Tork departed shortly after the band's September–October Far East tour in December 1968 and after the band completed work on their 1969 NBC television special, 33⅓ Revolutions Per Monkee.

In February 1969, the Monkees' seventh album, Instant Replay, without Tork's involvement beyond playing guitar on "I Won't Be the Same Without Her", was released, which reached No. 32 on the charts, and No. 45 in Canada. The single from the album was "Tear Drop City", which peaked at No. 56 on the U.S. Billboard chart, No. 27 on the Canadian chart, and No. 34 on the Australian chart. Dolenz contributed the biggest and longest Monkees' production, "Shorty Blackwell", a song celebrating his cat. Dolenz called it his "feeble attempt at something to do with Sgt. Pepper." In April 1969, the single "Someday Man" b/w "Listen to the Band" was released, which had the unique distinction of the B-side, a Nesmith-composed country-rock song, charting higher (No. 63) than the Jones-sung A-side (No. 81). In Canada, "Someday Man" was No. 74 and "Listen to the Band" reached No. 53.

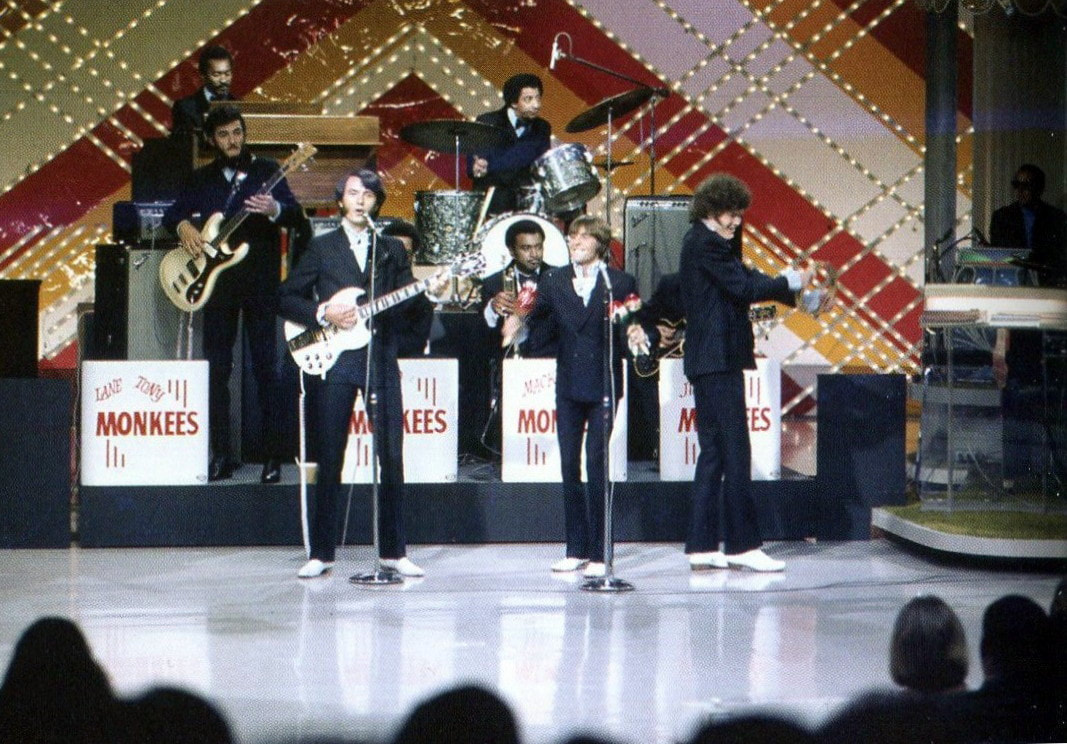
The Monkees (without Tork) performing on The Joey Bishop Show, backed by the Goodtimers, in 1969. The images of Jones and Dolenz were re-used for the cover art of the 1970 Monkees album Changes.

The final album with Nesmith from the Monkees' original incarnation was their eighth album, The Monkees Present, released in October 1969, which peaked at No. 100 on the Billboard charts. It included the Nesmith composed country-rock singles "Listen to the Band" and "Good Clean Fun" (released in September 1969)(No. 80 Canada). Other notable songs include the Dolenz composition "Little Girl", which featured Louie Shelton on electric guitar joining Dolenz on acoustic guitar.

In the summer of 1969, the three remaining Monkees embarked on a tour with the backing of the soul band Sam and the Goodtimers. Concerts for this tour were longer sets than their earlier performances tours, with many shows running over two hours. Although the tour was met with some positive critical reception (Billboard in particular praised it), other critics were not favorable of the mixing of the Monkees' pop music with the Goodtimers' R&B approach. Toward the end of the tour, some dates were canceled due to poor ticket sales. The tour failed to re-establish the band commercially, with no single entering the Top 40 in 1969. Dolenz remarked that the tour "was like kicking a dead horse. The phenomenon had peaked".

==== Nesmith's resignation, Changes and disbandment ====
On April 14, 1970, Nesmith joined Dolenz and Jones for the last time as part of the original incarnation of the Monkees to film a Kool-Aid commercial. The commercial featured the trio throwing Nerf balls around a mock living room. Nesmith left the group to continue recording songs with his own country-rock group called Michael Nesmith & the First National Band, which he had started recording with on February 10, 1970.

Changes, the ninth and final album by the Monkees released during its original incarnation, spawned the single "Oh My My" (US No. 98), which was accompanied by a music film promo (produced/directed by Dolenz). Dolenz contributed one of his own compositions, "Midnight Train", which was used in the re-runs of the Monkees TV series. The "Oh My My" b/w "I Love You Better" single from the Changes album was the last single issued under the Monkees name in the United States until 1986. Originally released in June 1970, Changes failed to chart in Billboard's Top 200 until the Monkees' 1986 reunion, when it stayed on the charts for four weeks (reaching No. 152).

September 22, 1970, marked the final recording session by the Monkees before the band broke up. On that date, Jones and Dolenz recorded "Do It in the Name of Love" and "Lady Jane". The single was not mixed until February 19, 1971, and was released later that year. The two remaining Monkees then lost the rights to use the name in several countries, the U.S. included. The single was not credited to the Monkees in the U.S., but to a misspelled "Mickey Dolenz and Davy Jones".

Both Jones and Dolenz pursued careers as solo artists in the years following the original breakup of the Monkees. However, Jones and Dolenz also toured as a duo in the 1970s.

In a 1977 interview, Nesmith falsely claimed that the Monkees outsold the Beatles and the Rolling Stones combined in 1967. This information was later repeated in newspapers and magazines.

=== Reunions and revivals ===
==== 1980s renaissance ====
The Monkees experienced a significant resurgence in critical and commercial popularity during the mid-1980s. This revival was catalyzed by a marathon of their original television series, titled "Pleasant Valley Sunday", broadcast on MTV on February 23, 1986. Simultaneously, Nickelodeon began daily reruns of the show, reintroducing the band to a new generation. These promotional efforts sparked a resurgence of "Monkeemania", leading to a successful concert tour. The initial spark of the reunion occurred in February and March 1986, when Peter Tork and Davy Jones performed together in Australia. In May 1986, Micky Dolenz, Davy Jones, and Peter Tork announced their "20th Anniversary Tour", which began in North America in June. The tour's success prompted additional performances in Australia, Europe, and North America, culminating in September 1989.

The Monkees' original albums saw renewed sales. Furthermore, the band released a new greatest hits compilation that achieved platinum certification. The success of the band during this period led to the release of their first single since 1971, "That Was Then, This Is Now". The track reached No. 20 on Billboard magazine's charts. The band's follow-up album, Pool It!, was released in 1987. During the 1980s revival, Nesmith remained largely absent. He did not contribute to any of the Monkees' studio recordings during this period.

==== 1990s reunions ====
The Monkees' eleventh album Justus was released in 1996. It was the first album since 1968 on which all four original members performed and produced, and it would be the last studio album in which all four Monkees directly participated (Jones's death would necessitate the use of archival recordings on later albums). Justus was produced by the Monkees, and all of its songs were written by one or two of the four Monkees. The album was recorded using only the four Monkees for all instruments and vocals, which was the inspiration for the album title and spelling (Justus = Just Us).

The trio of Dolenz, Jones, and Tork reunited again for a successful 30th anniversary tour of American amphitheaters in 1996. Nesmith joined them onstage in Los Angeles to promote the new songs from Justus. For the first time since the brief 1986 reunion, Nesmith returned to the concert stage for a tour of the United Kingdom in 1997, highlighted by two sold-out concerts at Wembley Arena in Wembley Park, London. In 1967, the Monkees had been the first group to headline on their own at the Empire Pool, as the Arena was then called. This was followed by a 1997 US tour featuring Tork, Jones, and Dolenz.

The full quartet also appeared in an ABC television special entitled Hey, Hey, It's the Monkees, which was written and directed by Nesmith and spoofed the original series that had made them famous.

==== 2000s reunions ====
After the 1997 tours, the group took another hiatus until they once again reunited in 2001 to tour the United States. However, this tour was also accompanied by public sniping. Dolenz and Jones had announced that they had "fired" Tork for his constant complaining and threatening to quit. Tork was quoted as confirming this, as well as stating that he wanted to tour with his own band, Shoe Suede Blues. Tork told WENN News that he "couldn't handle the backstage problems"; he added that because he was a recovering alcoholic, he was troubled by the overindulgence in alcohol by other members of the tour crew. Tork later stated in 2011 that alcohol played only a small role in his 2001 departure. He added, "I take full responsibility for the backstage problems on the 2001 tour. We were getting along pretty well until I had a meltdown. I ticked the other guys off good and proper... I really just behaved inappropriately, honestly. I apologized to them."

==== 45th anniversary tour and Jones's death ====
An Evening with The Monkees: The 45th Anniversary Tour (without Nesmith) commenced on May 12, 2011, in Liverpool, England, before moving to North America in June and July for a total of 43 performances. Monkees biographer Andrew Sandoval noted, "Once they hit the stage, the old magic was apparent. For the next three months...[they brought] the music and memories to fans in the band's grandest stage show in decades". The tour grossed approximately $4 million.

On August 8, 2011, the band canceled ten last-minute shows due to what was initially reported as "internal group issues and conflicts", though Tork later confirmed "there were some business affairs that couldn't be coordinated correctly. We hit a glitch and there was just this weird dislocation at one point".

Jones clarified that "the (45th Anniversary) tour was only supposed to go until July. And it was great, the best time we've had because we're all on the same page now. We jelled onstage and off. But then more dates were being added. And more... Some of these shows were 2 1/2 hours long... The audiences were great. But, let's face it, we're not kids."

The 45th anniversary tour was the last Monkees tour with Jones, who died of a heart attack at age 66 on February 29, 2012.

==== Reunion with Nesmith ====
On August 8, 2012, the surviving trio announced a series of U.S. shows for November and December, commencing in Escondido, California and concluding in New York City. The brief tour marked the first time Nesmith performed with the Monkees since 1997. Jones's memory was honored throughout the shows via recordings and video. During one point, the band went quiet and a recording of Jones singing "I Wanna Be Free" played while footage of him was screening behind the band. For Jones's signature song, "Daydream Believer", Dolenz said that the band had discussed who should sing the song and had concluded that it should be the fans, saying "It doesn't belong to us anymore. It belongs to you."

The fall 2012 tour was very well received by both fans and critics, resulting in the band's scheduling a 24-date summer tour for 2013. Dubbed "A Midsummer's Night with the Monkees", the concerts also featured Nesmith, Dolenz, and Tork. "The reaction to the last tour was euphoric", Dolenz told Rolling Stone magazine. "It was pretty apparent there was a demand for another one." A third tour with Nesmith followed in 2014.

In March 2014, the Monkees were inducted into the Pop Music Hall of Fame.

==== Good Times! and 50th anniversary ====
Dolenz and Tork toured as the Monkees in 2015 without Nesmith's participation. Nesmith stated that he was busy with other ventures, although Dolenz said that he was welcome to join them.

In February 2016, Dolenz announced that the Monkees would be releasing a new album, titled Good Times!, as a celebration of their 50th anniversary. Good Times! featured contributions by all three surviving members, as well as a posthumous contribution from Jones through vocals he had recorded in the 1960s. The album was released in May 2016 to considerable success, reaching No. 14 on the Billboard 200.

With the release of the album, the band, featuring Dolenz and Tork, commenced their 50th anniversary tour. Nesmith did not participate in most of the tour, again citing other commitments. He did, however, make a few appearances throughout the summer of 2016, appearing virtually via Skype to perform "Papa Gene's Blues" at one concert and in person for a four-song encore at another. In September, he replaced Tork on the tour for two dates while Tork attended to a family emergency. After Tork returned to the tour, Nesmith performed with the band for a concert at the Pantages Theatre in Hollywood on September 16.

==== The Mike and Micky Show, Christmas Party, and Tork's death ====
On February 20, 2018, a new tour was announced as "The Monkees Present: The Mike and Micky Show", their first tour as a duo; Tork was unable to participate due to health problems (a fact that was not revealed until after his death). Though the pair played Monkees music and promoted the tour under the Monkees banner, Dolenz and Nesmith respected Tork's absence by insisting that the shows be billed as a separate duo rather than being billed as official Monkees shows. Nesmith stated, "There's no pretense there about Micky and I being the Monkees. We're not."

The tour was cut short in June 2018 due to Nesmith undergoing quadruple bypass heart surgery following a health issue that had persisted since early in the tour. After a month-long stay in the hospital, he and Dolenz announced March 2019 as make-up dates for the missed shows.

The Monkees released a Christmas album, Christmas Party, on October 12, 2018. The album features a mix of holiday standards and original songs written by contemporary artists. In addition to newly recorded material from the three surviving Monkees, two previously recorded songs featuring vocals from Jones were also included.

Tork died of cancer on February 21, 2019. After Tork's death, Dolenz and Nesmith's rescheduled shows (and additional shows) of "The Mike and Micky Tour" were billed as Monkees shows.

==== Dolenz Sings Nesmith, farewell tour, and Nesmith's death ====
In May 2021, Dolenz released a solo album, Dolenz Sings Nesmith, featuring songs written by Nesmith and produced by Christian Nesmith.

Following the success of the Mike and Micky Show, Dolenz and Nesmith announced a follow-up tour, An Evening with the Monkees, to begin in early 2020. The tour was delayed, however, due to the COVID-19 pandemic. On May 4, 2021, it was announced that the rescheduled dates would be billed as a farewell tour. "The Monkees Farewell Tour" consisted of over 40 dates in the US from September to November; because of restrictions due to the ongoing COVID-19 pandemic, they were unable to play shows in Canada, the UK or Australia. The final date and final show for the Monkees Farewell Tour was held on November 14, 2021, at the Greek Theatre in Los Angeles.

Nesmith died of heart failure on December 10, 2021, less than a month after the final date of the 2021 tour. Nesmith's death left Dolenz as the only surviving member of the Monkees.

=== Micky Dolenz ===
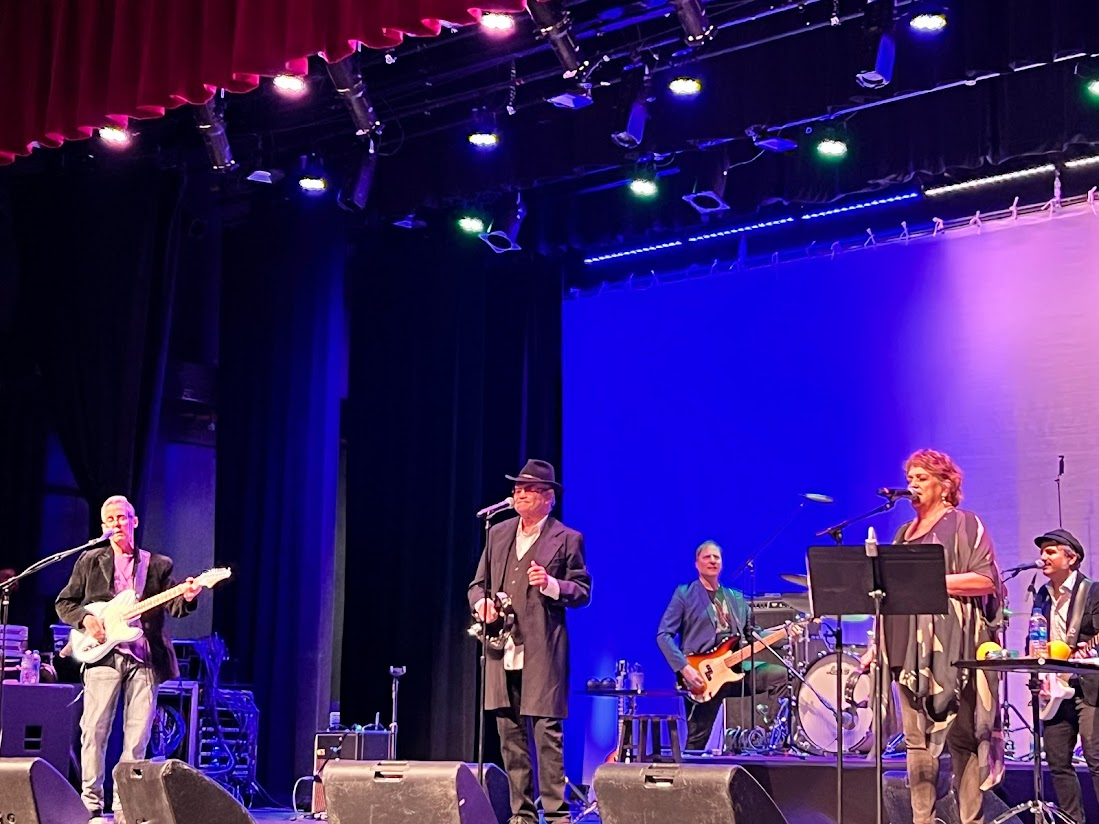
Dolenz performing on "The Monkees Celebrated by Micky Dolenz" tour, 2022

In early 2022, Dolenz announced that he would embark on a series of April 2022 concert dates called the "Micky Dolenz Celebrates the Monkees 2022 Tour".

== Impact and legacy ==
The Monkees were selected specifically to appeal to the youth market as American television's response to the Beatles. Andrew Sandoval wrote the following in The Hollywood Reporter:

[The Monkees] pioneered the music video format and paved the way for every boy band that followed in their wake, from New Kids on the Block to 'N Sync to the Jonas Brothers, while Davy set the stage for future teen idols David Cassidy and Justin Bieber. As pop stars go, you would be hard pressed to find a successful artist who didn't take a page from the Monkees' playbook, even generations later. Monkee money also enabled Rafelson and Schneider to finance Easy Rider and Five Easy Pieces, which made Jack Nicholson a star. In fact, the Monkees series was the opening salvo in a revolution that brought on the New Hollywood cinema, an influence rarely acknowledged but no less impactful.

The Chicago Tribune interviewed Davy Jones, who said, "We touched a lot of musicians, you know. I can't tell you the amount of people that have come up and said, 'I wouldn't have been a musician if it hadn't been for the Monkees.' It baffles me even now".

The Monkees found unlikely fans among musicians of the punk rock period of the mid-1970s. Many of these punk performers had grown up on TV reruns of the series, and sympathized with the anti-industry, anti-establishment trend of their career. Sex Pistols and Minor Threat both recorded versions of "(I'm Not Your) Steppin' Stone" and it was often played live by Toy Love. Japanese new wave pop group the Plastics recorded a synthesizer and drum-machine version of "Last Train to Clarksville" for their 1979 album Welcome Back.

Glenn A. Baker, author of Monkeemania: The True Story of the Monkees, described the Monkees as "rock's first great embarrassment" in 1986:

Like an illegitimate child in a respectable family, the Monkees are destined to be regarded forever as rock's first great embarrassment; misunderstood and maligned like a mongrel at a ritzy dog show, or a test tube baby at the Vatican... The fact was ignored that session players were being heavily employed by the Beach Boys, the Beatles, the Mamas and the Papas, the Byrds and other titans of the age. However, what could not be ignored, as rock disdained its pubescent past, was a group of middle-aged Hollywood businessmen had actually assembled their concept of a profitable rock group and foisted it upon the world. What mattered was that the Monkees had success handed to them on a silver plate.

Mediaite columnist Paul Levinson noted that "The Monkees were the first example of something created in a medium—in this case, a rock group on television—that jumped off the screen to have big impact in the real world."

When commenting on the death of Jones on February 29, 2012, Time magazine contributor James Poniewozik praised the television show, saying the following:

... even if the show never meant to be more than entertainment and a hit-single generator, we shouldn't sell The Monkees short. It was far better TV than it had to be; during an era of formulaic domestic sitcoms and wacky comedies, it was a stylistically ambitious show, with a distinctive visual style, absurdist sense of humor and unusual story structure. Whatever Jones and the Monkees were meant to be, they became creative artists in their own right, and Jones' chipper Brit-pop presence was a big reason they were able to produce work that was commercial, wholesome and yet impressively weird.

The band released four chart-topping albums (Note: Those four albums were The Monkees, More of the Monkees, Headquarters, and Pisces, Aquarius, Capricorn & Jones, Ltd., respectively.) and three chart-topping songs ("Last Train to Clarksville", "I'm a Believer", and "Daydream Believer"), and sold at least 21 million records in the US. (Note: In 1977, Michael Nesmith told a journalist that the Monkees had sold 35 million records in 1967 alone. Nesmith later admitted that this statement was a falsehood.) In fact, the band's four number one albums all reached the top of the charts in 1967. As of 2021, no other band has had four number one albums in the same calendar year.

=== In popular culture ===
The Criterion Collection, which has a stated goal to release "a continuing series of important classic and contemporary films, [and] has been dedicated to gathering the greatest films from around the world and publishing them in editions that offer the highest technical quality and award-winning, original supplements" recognized the Monkees' film Head as meeting their criteria when they fully restored and released it on DVD and Blu-ray in 2010. They stated that Head was "way, way ahead of its time" and "arguably the most authentically psychedelic film made in 1960s Hollywood.” Criterion said that Head “has since been reclaimed as one of the great cult objects of its era."

In the book Hey, Hey We're The Monkees, Rafelson wrote that, with Head, he explored unprecedented cinematic techniques, including filming actors underwater, the use of polarization, and inventing "double-matte experiences". "When it was shown in France, the head of the Cinematheque overly praised the movie as a cinematic masterpiece, and from that point on, this movie began to acquire an underground reputation." In 2010, Nick Vernier Band created a digital "Monkees reunion" through the release of Mister Bob (featuring the Monkees), a new song produced under license from Rhino Entertainment, containing vocal samples from the band's recording "Zilch". The contract bridge convention known as either Last Train or Last Train to Clarksville was so named by its inventor, Jeff Meckstroth, after the Monkees' song.

==== Comic books ====
A comic book series, The Monkees, was published in the United States by Dell Comics, which ran for 17 issues from 1967 to 1969.

==== Biopic ====
In 2000, VH-1 produced the television biopic Daydream Believers: The Monkees' Story.

==== Musical ====
A stage musical opened in the UK at the Manchester Opera House on Friday March 30, 2012, and was dedicated to Davy Jones (the Jones family attended the official opening on April 3). The production is a Jukebox musical and starred Stephen Kirwan, Ben Evans, Tom Parsons and Oliver Savile as actors playing the parts of the Monkees (respectively Dolenz, Jones, Nesmith, Tork) who are hired by an unscrupulous businessman to go on a world tour pretending to be the real band. The show includes 18 Monkees songs plus numbers by other 60s artists. It ran in Manchester as part of the "Manchester Gets it First" program until April 14, 2012, before a UK tour. Following its Manchester run, the show appeared in the Glasgow King's Theatre and the Sunderland Empire Theatre.

== Awards and achievements ==
=== Grammy Awards ===
Year	Category	Nominated work	Result
1967	Best Contemporary (R&R) Recording	"Last Train to Clarksville"	Nominated
1967	Best Contemporary (R&R) Group Performance, Vocal or Instrumental	"Last Train to Clarksville"	Nominated
1968	Best Performance by a Vocal Group	"I'm a Believer"	Nominated
1968	Best Contemporary Group Performance (Vocal or Instrumental)	"I'm a Believer"	Nominated

=== Kid's Choice Awards ===
Year	Category	Result	Ref.
1987	Favorite Music Group	Won	
1988	Favorite Male Vocalist	Nominated	

=== Notable achievements ===
- Gave the Jimi Hendrix Experience their first U.S. concert tour exposure as an opening act in July 1967.
- Inspired Gene Roddenberry to introduce the character of Chekov in his Star Trek TV series in response to the popularity of Davy Jones, complete with hairstyle and appearance mimicking that of Jones.
- Inducted into America's Pop Music Hall of Fame in 2014.
- Honored by the Music Business Association (Music Biz) with an Outstanding Achievement Award celebrating the band's 50th anniversary on May 16, 2016.
- Inducted into the Vocal Group Hall of Fame in 2007.

== Controversies ==
=== Rock and Roll Hall of Fame ===
Various magazines and news outlets, such as Time, NPR, Goldmine, Yahoo! Music and MSNBC have argued that the Monkees belong in the Rock and Roll Hall of Fame. In 1992, Davy Jones told People that he knew that the Monkees would never make it into the Rock and Roll Hall of Fame. In June 2007, Peter Tork complained to the New York Post that Jann Wenner had "blackballed" the Monkees from being inducted into the Rock and Roll Hall of Fame. Tork contended that Wenner held a grudge against the Monkees because the band members did not always write their own songs or play their own instruments during their early years.

== Members ==
- Micky Dolenz – lead and backing vocals, rhythm guitar, drums, percussion, keyboards (1966–1971, 1976, 1986–1989, 1996–1997, 2001–2002, 2011–2021)
- Davy Jones – lead and backing vocals, percussion, drums, rhythm guitar, bass (1966–1971, 1976, 1986–1989, 1996–1997, 2001–2002, 2011–2012; died 2012)
- Michael Nesmith – lead and rhythm guitars, keyboards, backing and lead vocals (1966–1970, 1986, 1989, 1996–1997, 2012–2014, 2016, 2018–2021; died 2021)
- Peter Tork – bass, rhythm and lead guitars, keyboards, banjo, backing and occasional lead vocals (1966–1968, 1976, 1986–1989, 1996–1997, 2001, 2011–2018; died 2019)

== Discography ==
- The Monkees (1966)
- More of the Monkees (1967)
- Headquarters (1967)
- Pisces, Aquarius, Capricorn & Jones Ltd. (1967)
- The Birds, the Bees & the Monkees (1968)
- Head (1968)
- Instant Replay (1969)
- The Monkees Present (1969)
- Changes (1970)
- Pool It! (1987)
- Justus (1996)
- Good Times! (2016)
- Christmas Party (2018)

== See also ==
- List of The Monkees episodes
- Monkeemobile
