= Andrew Sandoval =

American Grammy nominated compiler and engineer of reissues

Andrew Sandoval (born 1971 or 1972) is an American reissue producer, musician, and author.

== Career ==
As a teenager, Sandoval edited the fanzine The New Breed. In 1989, Sandoval began working for Rhino Records at the age of 17, and compiled the Monkees' album Missing Links Volume Two. Sandoval began performing as a musician "around the same time he got into the reissue biz".

Under the moniker Andrew, Sandoval has issued four albums and two EPs. In 1995, he contributed "Heading For a Fall" to the Hollies tribute compilation Sing Hollies in Reverse. In 1997, Sandoval released his first EP, Million Dollar Movie. In 2000, he released the album A Beautiful Story, co-produced by Brian Kehew.

In 2006, Sandoval launched a weekly radio show called Come To The Sunshine on LuxuriaMusic. On May 29, 2017, the program moved to WFMU's Rock & Soul Ichiban. On November 11, 2020, Come To The Sunshine was ported over to WFMU's Rock 'N Soul Radio stream.

In 2011, Sandoval began managing the Monkees. In 2020, he produced the group's album The Monkees Live: The Mike and Micky Show. Sandoval also managed Michael Nesmith.

== Reissue work ==
As a reissue compiler, Sandoval has worked on releases by such artists as the Beach Boys, Bee Gees, the Kinks, the Monkees, the Band, Elvis Costello, Big Star, Chris Bell, Jan & Dean, the Cyrkle, Left Banke, Love, The Pretty Things, Elton John, the Troggs, Wayne Fontana and the Mindbenders, P.F. Sloan, the Everly Brothers, Manfred Mann, Three Dog Night, the Zombies, Gene Clark, Tom Jones, the Grass Roots, Roger McGuinn, the Hollies, Blues Magoos, the Beau Brummels, Gary Lewis & the Playboys, Herman's Hermits, Dion DiMucci, the Turtles, Tommy James & the Shondells, Harry Nilsson and the Easybeats.

In 1995, Sandoval produced a complete series boxset of the Monkees' TV series on videocassette.

Sandoval assembled the 2004 compilations Come to the Sunshine: Soft Pop Nuggets from the WEA Vaults and Hallucinations: Psychedelic Pop Nuggets from the WEA Vaults. In 2009, Sandoval compiled and annotated the CD boxset Where the Action Is! Los Angeles Nuggets 1965–1968. The boxset was nominated for Best Historical Album at the 2011 Grammy Awards. Sandoval was listed alongside Alec Palao, Cheryl Pawelski, and Dan Hersch as recipients. At the 2027 Grammy Awards, Sandoval received a nomination for Best Album Notes on the 2025 super deluxe edition of the Monkees' Pieces, Aquarius, Capricorn & Jones Ltd. album.

== Author ==
In 2005, Sandoval wrote The Monkees: The Day-by-Day Story of the 60s TV Pop Sensation. Mojo magazine said the book was "[t]he only Monkees book you need" and described it as "an engaging document of one of the '60s most important phenomena.” In 2012, Sandoval published his second book, The Bee Gees Day-By-Day Story: 1945–1972 (ISBN 978-0-943249-08-7).

In 2021, Andrew Sandoval launched his own publishing imprint, Beatland Books. That year, he published an updated version of his Monkees book as The Monkees: The Day-by-Day Story.

Sandoval also served as editor and publisher of Micky Dolenz's 2023 book I’m Told I Had A Good Time: The Micky Dolenz Archives, Vol. 1 and Joe Russo's The Monkees - Smoke-Filled Dreams: The Unseen Archive of Joe Russo (2024).

In 2025, Sandoval published, edited and co-authored a revised version of Doug Hinman's The Kinks: All Day And All Of The Night (published by Backbeat Books in 2004). The book was revised and expanded in a multi-volume set, with the first book being titled The Kinks: All Day And All Of The Night - The Day-By-Day Story Pt. 1: 1940-1971. Jon Savage reviewed the book in Mojo calling it "A must for any Kinks fan or student of '60s pop" and awarding it five stars.

== Discography ==
Albums

- A Beautiful Story (2000)
- Happy to Be Here (2003)
- What's It All About? (2004)
- From Me to You (2007)

EPs

- Million Dollar Movie (1997)
- Happily Ever After (2004)
