= Listen to the Band (album) =

Box set by the Monkees
- Released: September 24, 1991
- Recorded: 1966–1987
- Genre: Rock
- Label: Rhino
- Producers: The Monkees, et al.

The Monkees chronology
Missing Links Volume Two (1990)	Listen to the Band (1991)	The ★ Collection: 25th Anniversary Edition (1992)

Professional ratings
Review scores
Source	Rating
AllMusic	4.5/5 stars

Listen to the Band is a box set compilation of recordings by the Monkees, issued by Rhino Records in 1991 to commemorate the group's 25th anniversary. The box set consisted of four CDs spanning the years 1966 to 1987, a 30-page LP-sized book featuring interviews with all four Monkees, as well as their songwriters and producers, and a full-color poster of Monkees memorabilia.

Most of the tracks were remixed from the original multitrack tapes. In most cases, these remixes are exclusive to this set.

== Track listing ==
Disc 1

No.	Title	Notes	Length
1.	"(Theme From) The Monkees" (Tommy Boyce / Bobby Hart)	From The Monkees
2.	"Last Train to Clarksville" (Boyce / Hart)	Single A-side; from The Monkees
3.	"Take a Giant Step" (Gerry Goffin / Carole King)	B-side of "Last Train to Clarksville"; from The Monkees
4.	"Saturday's Child" (David Gates)	From The Monkees
5.	"I Wanna Be Free" (Boyce / Hart)	Previously unreleased stereo remix; from The Monkees.
6.	"Papa Gene's Blues" (Michael Nesmith)	Previously unreleased stereo remix; from The Monkees.
7.	"Sweet Young Thing" (Goffin / King / Nesmith)	Previously unreleased stereo remix; from The Monkees.
8.	"Gonna Buy Me a Dog" (Boyce / Hart)	From The Monkees
9.	"All the King's Horses" (Nesmith)	1989 stereo remix. Originally unreleased; from Missing Links Volume Two.
10.	"I'm a Believer" (Neil Diamond)	Single A-side; from More of the Monkees
11.	"(I'm Not Your) Steppin' Stone" (Boyce / Hart)	Previously unreleased stereo remix. B-side of "I'm a Believer"; from More of the Monkees.
12.	"She" (Boyce / Hart)	Previously unreleased stereo remix; from More of the Monkees.
13.	"Mary, Mary" (Nesmith)	Previously unreleased stereo remix; from More of the Monkees.
14.	"Your Auntie Grizelda" (Jack Keller / Diane Hildebrand)	Previously unreleased stereo remix; from More of the Monkees.
15.	"Look Out (Here Comes Tomorrow)" (Diamond)	Previously unreleased stereo remix; from More of the Monkees.
16.	"Sometime in the Morning" (Goffin / King)	1987 stereo remix; from More of the Monkees.
17.	"I Don't Think You Know Me" (Goffin / King)	Previously unreleased version, with Peter Tork vocal
18.	"I'll Spend My Life With You" (Boyce / Hart)	Previously unreleased version
19.	"I'll Be Back Up on My Feet" (Sandy Linzer / Denny Randell)	1966 mono TV mix. Originally unreleased; from Missing Links Volume Two.

Disc 2

No.	Title	Notes	Length
1.	"A Little Bit Me, A Little Bit You" (Diamond)	1987 mono remix; single A-side.
2.	"The Girl I Knew Somewhere" (Nesmith)	1987 stereo remix; B-side of "A Little Bit Me, A Little Bit You".
3.	"She Hangs Out" (Jeff Barry / Ellie Greenwich)	Previously unreleased mono remix. Withdrawn Canadian single version.
4.	"All of Your Toys" (William E. Martin)	Previously unreleased mono remix. Originally unreleased; from Missing Links.
5.	"Love to Love" (Diamond)	Previously unreleased mono remix. Originally unreleased; from Monkee Business (US).
6.	"You Told Me" (Nesmith)	1989 stereo remix; from Headquarters.
7.	"Forget That Girl" (Chip Douglas)	1989 stereo remix. B-side of "Randy Scouse Git"; from Headquarters.
8.	"You Just May Be the One" (Nesmith)	1989 stereo remix; from Headquarters.
9.	"Shades of Gray" (Barry Mann / Cynthia Weil)	1987 stereo remix; from Headquarters.
10.	"For Pete's Sake" (Peter Tork / Joseph Richards)	1989 stereo remix; from Headquarters.
11.	"No Time" (Hank Cicalo)	1989 stereo remix; from Headquarters.
12.	"Randy Scouse Git" (Micky Dolenz)	1989 stereo remix. Single A-side; from Headquarters.
13.	"Pleasant Valley Sunday" (Goffin / King)	Previously unreleased stereo remix. Single version; from Pisces, Aquarius, Capricorn & Jones, Ltd.
14.	"Words" (Boyce / Hart)	1986 stereo remix. B-side of "Pleasant Valley Sunday"; from Pisces, Aquarius, Capricorn & Jones, Ltd.
15.	"Daydream Believer" (John Stewart)	Previously unreleased stereo remix. Single A-side; from The Birds, The Bees & The Monkees.
16.	"Goin' Down" (The Monkees / Hildebrand)	B-side of "Daydream Believer"
17.	"Salesman" (Craig Vincent Smith)	Previously unreleased stereo remix; from Pisces, Aquarius, Capricorn & Jones, Ltd.
18.	"The Door Into Summer" (Douglas / Bill Martin)	From Pisces, Aquarius, Capricorn & Jones, Ltd.
19.	"Love Is Only Sleeping" (Barry Mann / Cynthia Weil)	From Pisces, Aquarius, Capricorn & Jones, Ltd.
20.	"Cuddly Toy" (Harry Nilsson)	1986 stereo remix; from Pisces, Aquarius, Capricorn & Jones, Ltd.
21.	"What Am I Doing Hangin' Round?" (Michael Martin Murphy / Owens Castleman)	Previously unreleased stereo remix; from Pisces, Aquarius, Capricorn & Jones, Ltd.
22.	"Daily Nightly" (Nesmith)	From Pisces, Aquarius, Capricorn & Jones, Ltd.
23.	"Star Collector" (Goffin / King)	From Pisces, Aquarius, Capricorn & Jones, Ltd.
24.	"(I'm Not Your) Steppin' Stone (live version)" (Boyce / Hart)	Previously unreleased

Disc 3

No.	Title	Notes	Length
1.	"Valleri" (Boyce / Hart)	Previously unreleased stereo remix. Single A-side; from The Birds, The Bees & The Monkees.
2.	"Tapioca Tundra" (Nesmith)	1968 alternate stereo mix. B-side of "Valleri"; from The Birds, The Bees & The Monkees.
3.	"P.O. Box 9847" (Boyce / Hart)	Previously unreleased stereo remix; from The Birds, The Bees & The Monkees.
4.	"Auntie's Municipal Court" (Nesmith)	Previously unreleased stereo remix; from The Birds, The Bees & The Monkees.
5.	"Zor and Zam" (Bill Chadwick / John Chadwick)	Previously unreleased stereo remix; from The Birds, The Bees & The Monkees.
6.	"Nine Times Blue" (Nesmith)	1968 stereo mix. Originally unreleased; from Missing Links.
7.	"Tear the Top Right Off My Head" (Tork)	1968 mono mix; previously unreleased.
8.	"Carlisle Wheeling" (Nesmith)	Previously unreleased stereo remix. Originally unreleased; from Missing Links.
9.	"D. W. Washburn" (Jerry Leiber / Mike Stoller)	Single A-side
10.	"It's Nice to Be With You" (Jerry Goldstein)	B-side of "D. W. Washburn"
11.	"St. Matthew" (Nesmith)	1989 stereo mix. Originally unreleased; from Missing Links Volume Two.
12.	"Porpoise Song" (Goffin / King)	Previously unreleased stereo remix. Single version; from Head.
13.	"As We Go Along" (King / Toni Stern)	Previously unreleased stereo remix; from Head.
14.	"Circle Sky (live version)" (Nesmith)	Originally unreleased; from Missing Links Volume Two
15.	"Can You Dig It" (Tork)	From Head
16.	"Long Title: Do I Have to Do This All Over Again" (Tork)	From Head
17.	"Tear Drop City" (Boyce / Hart)	Previously unreleased stereo remix. Single A-side; from Instant Replay.
18.	"A Man Without a Dream" (Goffin / King)	B-side of "Tear Drop City"; from Instant Replay
19.	"Through the Looking Glass" (Boyce / Hart / Red Baldwin)	From Instant Replay
20.	"I Won't Be the Same Without Her" (Goffin / King)	Previously unreleased stereo remix; from Instant Replay.
21.	"You and I" (Davy Jones / B. Chadwick)	From Instant Replay
22.	"While I Cry" (Nesmith)	From Instant Replay

Disc 4

No.	Title	Notes	Length
1.	"Listen to the Band" (Nesmith)	Previously unreleased stereo remix. Single version; from The Monkees Present.
2.	"Someday Man" (Paul Williams / Roger Nichols)	B-side of "Listen to the Band"
3.	"Good Clean Fun" (Nesmith)	Previously unreleased stereo remix. Single A-side; from The Monkees Present.
4.	"Mommy and Daddy" (Dolenz)	1969 alternate stereo mix. B-side of "Good Clean Fun"; from The Monkees Present.
5.	"Looking for the Good Times" (Boyce / Hart)	Previously unreleased stereo remix; from The Monkees Present.
6.	"Some of Shelly's Blues" (Nesmith)	1989 stereo remix. Originally unreleased; from Missing Links Volume Two.
7.	"Steam Engine" (Douglas)	Previously unreleased stereo remix. Originally unreleased; from Monkee Business (U.S. version).
8.	"Oh My My" (Barry / Andy Kim)	Single A-side; from Changes
9.	"I Love You Better" (Barry / Kim)	B-side of "Oh My My"; from Changes
10.	"Do It in the Name of Love" (Bobby Bloom / Neil Goldberg)	Previously unreleased stereo remix; single A-side (as "Mickey (sic) Dolenz & Davy Jones").
11.	"That Was Then, This Is Now" (Vance Brescia)	Single A-side (as "Micky Dolenz & Peter Tork of the Monkees"); from Then & Now... The Best of The Monkees
12.	"Anytime, Anyplace, Anywhere" (Hart / Dick Eastman)	From Then & Now... The Best of The Monkees
13.	"Heart and Soul" (Andrew Howell / Simon Byrne)	Single A-side; from Pool It!
14.	"Gettin' In" (Tork)	From Pool It!
15.	"Every Step of the Way" (Ian Hunter / Mark Clarke)	Single version; from Pool It!
