= Greatest Hits (1995 Monkees album) =

1995 compilation album by The Monkees

Greatest hits album by the Monkees
- Released: October 24, 1995
- Recorded: 1966–1987
- Genre: Rock
- Length: 59:12
- Label: Rhino 72190
- Producers: Tommy Boyce, Bobby Hart, Jack Keller, Jeff Barry, Michael Nesmith, Chip Douglas, The Monkees, Gerry Goffin, Michael Lloyd, Roger Bechirian

The Monkees chronology
The ★ Collection: 25th Anniversary Edition (1992)	Greatest Hits (1995)	Barrelful of Monkees: Monkees Songs for Kids! (1996)

Professional ratings
Review scores
Source	Rating
AllMusic	4.5/5 stars
MusicHound	5/5 stars

The Monkees' 1995 Greatest Hits album was the third so titled to date. It was issued when Rhino Records took over the Monkees' catalog, and was intended to replace the existing Arista compilations. It has since been superseded by The Monkees Anthology and The Best of the Monkees.

== Track listing ==
No.	Title	Writer(s)	Lead vocals	Length
1.	"(Theme From) The Monkees"	Tommy Boyce, Bobby Hart	Micky Dolenz	2:21
2.	"Last Train to Clarksville"	Boyce, Hart	Dolenz	2:46
3.	"I Wanna Be Free"	Boyce, Hart	Davy Jones	2:27
4.	"I'm a Believer"	Neil Diamond	Dolenz	2:47
5.	"(I'm Not Your) Steppin' Stone" (Single version)	Boyce, Hart	Dolenz	2:23
6.	"Mary, Mary"	Michael Nesmith	Dolenz	2:17
7.	"A Little Bit Me, a Little Bit You"	Diamond	Jones	2:51
8.	"The Girl I Knew Somewhere"	Nesmith	Dolenz	2:35
9.	"Randy Scouse Git"	Micky Dolenz	Dolenz	2:36
10.	"Pleasant Valley Sunday" (Single version)	Gerry Goffin, Carole King	Dolenz	3:11
11.	"Words" (Single version)	Boyce, Hart	Dolenz, Peter Tork	2:52
12.	"Daydream Believer"	John Stewart	Jones	3:01
13.	"Goin' Down"	Diane Hildebrand, Peter Tork, Nesmith, Dolenz, Jones	Dolenz	4:25
14.	"Valleri"	Boyce, Hart	Jones	2:21
15.	"D. W. Washburn"	Jerry Leiber, Mike Stoller	Dolenz	2:51
16.	"It's Nice to Be with You"	Jerry Goldstein	Jones	2:54
17.	"Porpoise Song (Theme from Head)" (Single version)	Goffin, King	Dolenz	4:13
18.	"Listen to the Band" (Single version)	Nesmith	Michael Nesmith	2:34
19.	"That Was Then, This Is Now" (Micky Dolenz & Peter Tork of The Monkees)	Vance Brescia	Dolenz	4:04
20.	"Heart and Soul"	Simon Byrne, Andrew Howell	Dolenz	3:44

=== Notes ===
- All songs are in stereo except "(I'm Not Your) Steppin' Stone," "A Little Bit Me, a Little Bit You," "Pleasant Valley Sunday," and "Words" which are in mono.
- "A Little Bit Me, a Little Bit You" and "The Girl I Knew Somewhere" are not original mixes but the 1987 remixes as first released on the CD version of The Monkees Greatest Hits (Arista) in 1987.
- "Valleri" does not fade out but has the "cold ending" as first released on Then & Now... The Best of The Monkees in 1986.

== Charts ==
Weekly chart performance for Greatest Hits
Chart (1995)	Peak position
US Billboard 200	21

== Certifications ==
Region	Certification	Certified units/sales
United States (RIAA)	Gold	500,000^{^}
^{^} Shipments figures based on certification alone.
