= The Monkees Anthology =

Compilation album by The Monkees
- Released: April 28, 1998
- Recorded: July 1966–August 1996
- Genre: Pop rock
- Label: Rhino
- Producer: Tommy Boyce, Bobby Hart, Jack Keller, Jeff Barry, Michael Nesmith, Chip Douglas, The Monkees, Gerry Goffin, Michael Lloyd, Roger Bechirian

The Monkees chronology
Daydream Believer and Other Hits (1998)	The Monkees Anthology (1998)	The Headquarters Sessions (2000)

Professional ratings
Review scores
Source	Rating
AllMusic	4/5 stars
MusicHound	4.5/5 stars
The Rolling Stone Album Guide	3/5 stars

The Monkees Anthology is a two-CD compilation set by the Monkees issued in 1998, and is the first collection to include material from their most recent studio album at the time, Justus. It includes almost all the original singles and B-sides (excluding "Tapioca Tundra", "D.W. Washburn", "It's Nice to Be with You", "Tear Drop City", "A Man Without a Dream", "Someday Man", the single version of "Mommy and Daddy", and "I Love You Better"), as well as a TV rarity and one live track.

== Track listing ==
=== Disc one ===
1. "(Theme From) The Monkees" (Tommy Boyce, Bobby Hart)
2. "Last Train to Clarksville" (Boyce, Hart)
3. "Take a Giant Step" (Gerry Goffin, Carole King)
4. "I Wanna Be Free" (Boyce, Hart)
5. "Papa Gene's Blues" (Michael Nesmith)
6. "Saturday's Child" (David Gates)
7. "Sweet Young Thing" (Goffin, King, Nesmith)
8. "I'm a Believer" (Neil Diamond)
9. "(I'm Not Your) Steppin' Stone" (Boyce, Hart) (Single version)
10. "She" (Boyce, Hart)
11. "Mary, Mary" (Nesmith)
12. "Your Auntie Grizelda" (Diane Hildebrand, Jack Keller)
13. "Sometime in the Morning" (Goffin, King)
14. "Look Out (Here Comes Tomorrow)" (Diamond)
15. "I'll Be Back Up on My Feet" (Sandy Linzer, Denny Randell) (TV version)
16. "A Little Bit Me, a Little Bit You" (Diamond)
17. "All of Your Toys" (Bill Martin)
18. "The Girl I Knew Somewhere" (Nesmith)
19. "You Told Me" (Nesmith)
20. "Forget That Girl" (Douglas Farthing Hatlelid)
21. "You Just May Be the One" (Nesmith)
22. "Shades of Gray" (Barry Mann, Cynthia Weil)
23. "For Pete's Sake" (Peter Tork, Joey Richards)
24. "Randy Scouse Git" (Micky Dolenz)
25. "No Time" (Hank Cicalo)

=== Disc two ===
1. "Pleasant Valley Sunday" (Goffin, King) (Single version)
2. "Words" (Boyce, Hart) (Single version)
3. "Daydream Believer" (John Stewart)
4. "Goin' Down" (Hildebrand, Tork, Nesmith, Dolenz, Davy Jones)
5. "The Door into Summer" (Chip Douglas, Martin)
6. "Cuddly Toy" (Harry Nilsson)
7. "Love Is Only Sleeping" (Mann, Weil)
8. "What am I Doing Hangin' 'Round?" (Michael Martin Murphey, Owen Castleman)
9. "Star Collector" (Goffin, King)
10. "Valleri" (Boyce, Hart)
11. "Auntie's Municipal Court" (Nesmith, Keith Allison)
12. "Zor and Zam" (Bill Chadwick, John Chadwick)
13. "Porpoise Song (Theme from Head)" (Goffin, King) (Single version)
14. "As We Go Along" (King, Toni Stern)
15. "Circle Sky" (Nesmith) (Live Version)
16. "Through the Looking Glass" (Red Baldwin, Boyce, Hart)
17. "You and I" (Chadwick, Jones) (from Instant Replay)
18. "While I Cry" (Nesmith)
19. "Listen to the Band" (Nesmith) (Single version)
20. "Good Clean Fun" (Nesmith)
21. "Mommy and Daddy" (Dolenz) (Alternate version)
22. "Oh My My" (Jeff Barry, Andy Kim)
23. "That Was Then, This Is Now" (Vance Brescia)
24. "Heart and Soul" (Simon Byrne, Andrew Howell)
25. "You and I" (Dolenz, Jones) (from Justus)
