= The Monkees' Golden Album =

Greatest hits album by The Monkees
- Released: December 1967
- Recorded: 1966–1967
- Genre: Pop rock
- Label: RCA Records

The Monkees' Golden Album is a Japanese compilation album by the American pop rock band the Monkees. It was the first compilation album for the Monkees released anywhere in the world, predating the first American compilation by more than a year.

Released at the end of 1967 by RCA Records, it includes both sides of the Monkees' first four singles, plus six album cuts from The Monkees and More of the Monkees. It was the first time the singles "A Little Bit Me, a Little Bit You" and "The Girl I Knew Somewhere" appeared on an album. The record was a massive hit in Japan, spending 18 weeks at No. 1 on the Cash Box Japanese albums chart, from January 6 to May 4, 1968.

The Monkees' Golden Album, Vol. 2 followed in 1969.

== Track listing ==
=== The Monkees' Golden Album (1967) ===
Side one

1. "(theme from) The Monkees" (Tommy Boyce, Bobby Hart)
2. "Last Train to Clarksville" (Boyce, Hart)
3. "Take a Giant Step" (Carole King, Gerry Goffin)
4. "(I'm Not Your) Steppin' Stone" (Boyce, Hart)
5. "Saturday's Child" (David Gates)
6. "She" (Boyce, Hart)
7. "I'm a Believer" (Neil Diamond)

Side two

1. "Words" (Boyce, Hart)
2. "A Little Bit Me, a Little Bit You" (Diamond)
3. "I Wanna Be Free" (Boyce, Hart)
4. "The Girl I Knew Somewhere" (Michael Nesmith)
5. "Let's Dance On" (Boyce, Hart)
6. "Tomorrow's Gonna Be Another Day" (Boyce, Hart)
7. "Pleasant Valley Sunday" (Goffin, King)

=== The Monkees' Golden Album, Vol. 2 (1969) ===
Side one

1. a. "(theme from) The Monkees" (Boyce, Hart)
  b. "Listen to the Band" (Nesmith)
2. "Daydream Believer" (John Stewart)
3. "D. W. Washburn" (Jerry Leiber, Mike Stoller)
4. "Cuddly Toy" (Harry Nilsson)
5. "We Were Made for Each Other" (Carole Bayer, George Fischoff)
6. "Shades of Gray" (Barry Mann, Cynthia Weil)
7. "Zor and Zam" (Bill Chadwick, John Chadwick)

Side two

1. "Valleri" (Boyce, Hart)
2. "Tear Drop City" (Boyce, Hart)
3. "Someday Man" (Roger Nichols, Paul Williams)
4. "Randy Scouse Git" (Micky Dolenz)
5. "Star Collector" (King, Goffin)
6. "A Man Without a Dream" (King, Goffin)
7. "I'll Be Back Up on My Feet" (Sandy Linzer, Denny Randell)
