= Missing Links Volume Three =

Compilation album by The Monkees
- Released: March 26, 1996
- Recorded: 1966–1969
- Studios: RCA Victor (Hollywood); RCA Victor, A (Hollywood); Sunset Sound Recorders (Hollywood); RCA Victor (Nashville); Western Recorders (Hollywood); T.T.G. (Hollywood); RCA Victor, C (Hollywood); RCA Victor, B (New York City)
- Genre: Rock
- Length: 51:58
- Label: Rhino
- Producers: Andrew Sandoval, Bill Inglot

The Monkees chronology
Barrelful of Monkees: Monkees Songs for Kids! (1996)	Missing Links Volume Three (1996)	Justus (1996)

Professional ratings
Review scores
Source	Rating
AllMusic	3/5 stars

Missing Links Volume Three is a compilation album of rare and previously unreleased songs by the American pop rock band the Monkees, issued by Rhino Records in 1996. It is the third and final volume of a three-volume set, preceded by Missing Links in 1987 and Missing Links Volume Two in 1990.

While many of the tracks had been featured in the Monkees' television series, only six of the tracks had ever been issued commercially: "Steam Engine" and "Love to Love" had first appeared on the Australian compilation Monkeemania (40 Timeless Hits) in 1979; "Tema Dei Monkees" and "She Hangs Out" had been issued as singles (in Italy and Canada, respectively) and had been collected on the compilation Monkee Business in 1982; the alternate mix of "Circle Sky" had first appeared on the compilation Monkee Flips in 1984; and "Tear the Top Right Off My Head" had first appeared on the Listen to the Band box set in 1991.

The release marks the first time the television edit of the series' opening theme song was made available (not counting the TeeVee Tunes 1987 release, Television's Greatest Hits Volume II, where the theme appeared as track 25 on the CD version). All previous releases of the theme song featured the album version, which is twice as long but lacks the television version's final verse.

"Little Red Rider" and "Hollywood" were re-recorded by Michael Nesmith for his solo album Magnetic South.

In 2021, Friday Music released the album on colored vinyl for Record Store Day.

== Track listing ==
No.	Title	Lead vocals	Length
1.	"(Theme From) The Monkees (TV version)" (Tommy Boyce, Bobby Hart)	Micky Dolenz	0:51
2.	"Kellogg's Jingle" (unknown)	Dolenz	0:13
3.	"We'll Be Back in a Minute #1" (Dolenz)	Dolenz	0:22
4.	"Through the Looking Glass (previously unissued alternate version)" (Boyce, Hart, Red Baldwin)	Dolenz	2:36
5.	"Propinquity (I've Just Begun to Care)" (Michael Nesmith)	Nesmith	3:21
6.	"Penny Music" (Michael Leonard, Bobby Weinstein, Jon Stroll)	Davy Jones	2:40
7.	"Tear the Top Right Off My Head" (Peter Tork)	Tork	2:06
8.	"Little Red Rider" (Nesmith)	Nesmith	3:18
9.	"You're So Good" (Robert Stone)	Dolenz	2:43
10.	"Look Down" (Carole King, Toni Stern)	Jones	2:52
11.	"Hollywood" (Nesmith)	Nesmith	2:17
12.	"Midnight Train (demo version)" (Dolenz)	Dolenz	2:29
13.	"She Hangs Out (single version)" (Jeff Barry, Ellie Greenwich)	Jones	2:36
14.	"Shake 'Em Up (And Let 'Em Roll)" (Jerry Leiber, Mike Stoller)	Dolenz	2:11
15.	"Circle Sky (alternate mix)" (Nesmith)	Nesmith	2:32
16.	"Steam Engine (previously unissued alternate mix)" (Chip Douglas)	Dolenz	2:25
17.	"Love to Love (previously unissued alternate mix)" (Neil Diamond)	Jones	2:30
18.	"She'll Be There" (Sharon Sheeley, Raul Abeyta)	Dolenz	2:35
19.	"How Insensitive" (Antonio Carlos Jobim, Vinicus DeMoraes, Norman Gimbel)	Nesmith	2:33
20.	"Merry Go Round" (Peter Tork, Diane Hildebrand)	Tork	1:44
21.	"Angel Band" (Jefferson Hascall, William Bradbury)	Nesmith	3:26
22.	"Zor and Zam (TV version)" (Bill Chadwick, John Chadwick)	Dolenz	2:08
23.	"We'll Be Back in a Minute #2" (Dolenz)	Dolenz	0:23
24.	"Tema Dei Monkees" (Boyce, Hart, Carlo Nistri)	Dolenz	1:10

== Personnel ==
Credits as per CD liner notes.

The Monkees

- Micky Dolenz – lead vocals (1–4, 9, 12, 14, 16, 18, 22–24), guitar (3, 23), kazoo (3, 23), backing vocals (7, 14, 24), acoustic guitar (12, 18)
- Michael Nesmith – lead vocals (5, 8, 11, 15, 19, 21), harmony vocals (5), backing vocals (8), organ (15)
- Davy Jones – lead vocals (6, 10, 13, 17), backing vocals (13)
- Peter Tork – lead vocal (7, 20), electric guitar (7), fuzz guitar (7), piano (20), organ (20), bass guitar (20)

Additional musicians

- Tommy Boyce – backing vocal (1, 4)
- Wayne Erwin – guitar (1, 24)
- Gerry McGee – guitar (1, 4, 24)
- Louie Shelton – guitar (1, 4, 8–9, 21, 24)
- Larry Taylor – bass guitar (1, 4, 24)
- Billy Lewis – drums (1, 4, 24)
- Gene Estes – tambourine (1, 24)
- Henry Diltz – banjo (3, 23), clarinet (14)
- Chip Douglas – bass guitar (3, 23)
- Michael Rubini – piano (4, 9–10), keyboards (21)
- Alan Estes – tambourine, tympani (4)
- Felton Jarvis – guitar (5, 19)
- Wayne Moss – guitar (5)
- Lloyd Green – steel guitar (5, 11, 19)
- Sonny Osborne – banjo (5, 11)
- David Briggs – organ (5), piano (19)
- Norbert Putnam – bass guitar (5, 19)
- Kenneth Buttrey – drums (5)
- Lance Wakely – acoustic guitar (7), harmonica (7)
- Ronald Brown – bass guitar (7)
- Dewey Martin – drums (7)
- Al Casey – guitar (8, 10, 21)
- Larry Knechtel – piano (8), bass guitar (10)
- Max Bennett – bass guitar (8, 21)
- Joe Osborn – bass guitar (8)
- Hal Blaine – drums (8, 10, 21)
- Mack Johnson – horns (8–9)
- Lester Robertson – horns (8–9)
- Clifford Solomon – horns (8–9)
- James Burton – guitar (9)
- Bob West – bass guitar (9)
- Earl Palmer – drums (9)
- John Williams – horns (9)
- Carole King – backing vocal (10)
- Denis Budimir – guitar (10)
- Tommy Tedesco – guitar (10)
- Kenneth Watson – tambourine, bells (10)
- Jules Chaikin – horns (10)
- Jim Horn – horns (10)
- Lew McCreary – horns (10)
- Jay Migliori – horns (10)
- Shorty Rogers – horns (10)
- Anthony Terran – horns (10)
- Billy Sanford – electric guitar (11)
- Bobby Dyson – bass guitar (11)
- William Ackerman – drums (11)
- Coco Dolenz – harmony vocal (12, 14, 18)
- Al Gorgoni – guitar (13, 17)
- Hugh McCracken – guitar (13, 17)
- Don Thomas – guitar (13, 17)
- Arthur Butler – organ (13, 17)
- Stan Free – clavinet (13, 17)
- Louis Mauro – bass guitar (13, 17)
- James Tyrrell – bass guitar (13, 17)
- Herb Lovelle – drums (13, 17)
- Thomas Cerone – tambourine (13, 17)
- Keith Allison – electric guitar (14), guitar (15, 22)
- Bill Chadwick – acoustic guitar (14), guitar (15, 22)
- Chip Douglas – bass guitar (14)
- Richard Dey – bass guitar (15, 22)
- John Gross – bass guitar (15)
- Eddie Hoh – drums (15, 22)
- Clarence White – guitar (16)
- Red Rhodes – steel guitar (16)
- Lyle Ritz – bass guitar (16)
- Jim Gordon – drums (16)
- Harold Bradley – guitar (19)
- Bobby Thompson – banjo (19)
- Buddy Spicher – fiddle (19)

Unconfirmed personnel and duties

- Musicians, producers (2)
- Handclaps (3, 23)
- Backing vocals (4, 13, 16, 22)
- Musicians (6)
- Cowbell (8–9)
- Producer (10, 22)
- Harmonica (11)
- Drums (14)
- Keyboards, horns (16)
- Choir (21)
- Henry Diltz – unknown (22)
- Piano, percussion (22)

Technical

- Andrew Sandoval – compilation producer; compilation, sessionography, research, annotation
- Bill Inglot – compilation producer, remastering
- Harold Bronson – executive producer
- Tommy Boyce – producer (1, 4)
- Bobby Hart – producer (1, 4)
- Micky Dolenz – producer (3, 23)
- Brendan Cahill – producer (3, 23)
- Bill Lazerus – engineer (3, 23)
- Michael Nesmith – producer (5, 8–9, 11, 19)
- Felton Jarvis – producer (5, 11, 19)
- Al Pachucki – engineer (5, 11, 19)
- Davy Jones – producer (6)
- Pete Abbott – engineer (6, 8–9, 20)
- Peter Tork – producer (7, 20)
- Artie Butler – arranger (10)
- Bill Vandevort – engineer (11)
- Chip Douglas – producer (12, 16, 18)
- Hank Cicalo – engineer (12, 18)
- Jeff Barry – producer (13, 17), arranger (13)
- Don Kirshner – music supervisor (13, 17)
- Ray Hall – engineer (13, 17)
- Lester Sill – producer (14)
- The Monkees – producers (15)
- Eddie Brackett – engineer (16)
- Colgems – producer (24)
- Patrick Milligan – project assistant
- Dan Hersch – remastering
- Rachel Gutek – art direction
- Lisa Sutton – cover design
- Nadia Block – design
- Gene Trindl – cover photo
