= Missing Links Volume Two =

Compilation album by the Monkees
- Released: January 1990
- Recorded: 1966–1969
- Genre: Rock
- Length: 46:33
- Label: Rhino
- Producer: Tommy Boyce, Bobby Hart, The Monkees, Jeff Barry, Mike Nesmith, Jack Keller, Chip Douglas
- Compiler: Bill Inglot, Andrew P. Sandoval

The Monkees chronology
Pool It! (1987)	Missing Links Volume Two (1990)	Listen to the Band (1991)

Professional ratings
Review scores
Source	Rating
AllMusic	3/5 stars

Missing Links Volume Two is a compilation album of rare and previously unreleased songs by the American pop rock band the Monkees, issued by Rhino Records in 1990. It is the second volume of a three-volume set, preceded by Missing Links in 1987 and followed by Missing Links Volume Three in 1996.

While several of the tracks had been featured in the Monkees' television series, only one of the tracks had ever been issued commercially: the live version of "Circle Sky" had appeared in the Monkees' feature film Head and was previously released on the Australian compilation Monkeemania (40 Timeless Hits) in 1979.

This compilation contains one mislabeled track, as "Down the Highway" is mistitled "Michigan Blackhawk".

In 2021, Friday Music released the album on colored vinyl for Record Store Day.

== Track listing ==
CD version
No.	Title	Writer(s)	Lead vocal	Length
1.	"All the King's Horses"	Michael Nesmith	Micky Dolenz	2:18
2.	"Valleri" (TV version)	Tommy Boyce; Bobby Hart	Davy Jones	2:34
3.	"St. Matthew"	Nesmith	Nesmith	2:44
4.	"Words" (TV version)	Boyce; Hart	Dolenz; Peter Tork	3:04
5.	"Some of Shelly's Blues"	Nesmith	Nesmith	2:33
6.	"I Wanna Be Free" (TV version)	Boyce; Hart	Jones; Dolenz	2:48
7.	"If I Ever Get to Saginaw Again"	Bob Russell; Jack Keller	Nesmith	2:45
8.	"Come On In"	Jo Mapes	Tork	3:11
9.	"I'll Be Back Up on My Feet" (TV version)	Sandy Linzer; Denny Randell	Dolenz	2:39
10.	"Down the Highway"	Carole King; Toni Stern	Nesmith	2:16
11.	"Hold On Girl"	Ben Raleigh; Billy Carr; Keller	Jones	2:45
12.	"The Crippled Lion"	Nesmith	Nesmith	2:52
13.	"Changes"	Jones; Steve Pitts	Jones	2:27
14.	"Mr. Webster"	Boyce; Hart	Dolenz	2:55
15.	"You Just May Be the One" (TV version)	Nesmith	Nesmith	2:00
16.	"(I Prithee) Do Not Ask for Love"	Michael Martin Murphey	Dolenz	2:58
17.	"Circle Sky" (live)	Nesmith	Nesmith	2:27
18.	"Seeger's Theme"	Pete Seeger	Tork (whistling)	0:45
19.	"Riu Chiu"	Traditional	Dolenz	1:32
Total length:				46:33

- Tracks 7, 11, 14 and 15 are CD bonus tracks.

== Personnel ==
Credits as per CD liner notes.

- Bill Inglot – producer, compiler, digital prep and transfers
- Andrew P. Sandoval – producer, compiler, liner notes
- Tommy Boyce – producer (1–2, 4, 6, 14–15)
- Bobby Hart – producer (1–2, 4, 6, 14–15)
- The Monkees – producer (3, 5, 7–8, 12–13, 17)
- Jeff Barry – producer (9, 11)
- Mike Nesmith – producer (10, 16)
- Jack Keller – producer (11)
- Chip Douglas – producer (19)
- Geoff Gans – art direction
- April Conquest – design
- Henry Diltz – photos
- John Strother – remixing
- Ken Perry – digital prep and transfers
