= Goin' Down (The Monkees song) =

Single by The Monkees
- A-side: "Daydream Believer"
- Released: October 25, 1967
- Recorded: June 21, July 5, September 15, 23 and October 3–4, 1967
- Studio: RCA Victor, Hollywood; Western, Hollywood
- Genre: Jazz-rock; avant-pop
- Length: 3:57
- Label: Colgems
- Songwriters: Micky Dolenz; Davy Jones; Peter Tork; Michael Nesmith; Diane Hildebrand
- Producer: Chip Douglas

The Monkees singles chronology
"Pleasant Valley Sunday" (1967)	"Goin' Down" (1967)	"Valleri" (1968)

"Goin' Down" is a song by the American pop rock band the Monkees, written by all four members of the group along with Diane Hildebrand. It was first released as the B-side to the "Daydream Believer" single on Colgems Records on October 25, 1967, in support of the band's fourth album, Pisces, Aquarius, Capricorn & Jones Ltd. The song managed to bubble under the Billboard Hot 100 upon its release.

== Composition ==
=== Music ===
According to interviews with various members of the band, the song was inspired by Mose Allison's "Parchman Farm." Michael Nesmith explained, "Peter [Tork] had always loved to jam on 'Parchman Farm' and started off on this thing. We just headed off into la-la land. Then Micky [Dolenz] started riffing this thing over the top of it." Tork added, "Somebody gave me an arrangement of 'Parchman Farm' that a friend of theirs had sort of generated – the real folk process at work. I had played that version around for a while amongst the guys. I don't remember why we started playing it that day, but we just jammed it unrehearsed." Dolenz concluded, "It was the exact same song, and we were covering it basically. So we did the tracks, and it came out real good. I remember Mike saying, 'All it is is the chord progression; we're not going to steal the melody or anything. Let's use this track but write other words, another melody to it. Why should we just cover somebody else's tune?' So I said, 'OK, fine. Good idea.'"

The song features energetic, rapid lead vocals by Dolenz and big band influences, with an arrangement by jazz musician Shorty Rogers and a high-note trumpet solo by Wrecking Crew member Bud Brisbois.

=== Lyrics ===
Diane Hildebrand's lyrics to "Goin' Down" describe a man who attempts suicide by drunkenly leaping into a river after his relationship with a woman has ended. He immediately regrets his decision, but achieves a self-realization during the night as the current carries him downstream. By sunrise of the following morning, his mood has greatly improved and he has decided to travel to New Orleans in search of some "swingin' scenes."

Dolenz explained, "Diane Hildebrand was given the track, and she was told to go away and write a song. She came back with this song, and I started practicing it. Singing it like this (adopts slow tempo). She said, 'No, no. It's twice that fast.' I was doing it half-time. I remember that I said, 'What?!' She said, 'Yes, it's twice that fast.' I get a lot of comments about that tune. (On the TV show) I did that live. You don't see nobody doing that stuff these days, do ya?"

== Reception and legacy ==
With the song's A-side "Daydream Believer" reaching number one on the Billboard Hot 100, "Goin' Down" managed to chart at number 104 nationally. After its release, the composition became a staple of the Monkees' touring setlists, with a live version of the song appearing on the album 2001: Live in Las Vegas. An extended rendition of "Goin' Down" also appears on the deluxe version of Pisces, Aquarius, Capricorn & Jones Ltd., Greatest Hits, The Best of the Monkees, and Extended Versions.

In 2012, the song was featured on an episode of the television series Breaking Bad, during a scene in which characters cook methamphetamine. Dolenz responded, "'Goin' Down' has nothing to do with drugs, obviously. And I certainly don't condone meth — that is nasty stuff that kills a lot of people and ruins a lot of lives. ... On the other hand, I like the TV show, it's very well-made". Because the rights to the band's catalog remained with the record company, he was not consulted in advance on the song's use, and said he "didn't make a dime" from it.

== Personnel ==
Adapted from Pisces, Aquarius, Capricorn & Jones Ltd.: Deluxe Edition CD liner notes.

The Monkees

- Micky Dolenz – lead vocals
- Michael Nesmith – electric guitar
- Peter Tork – electric guitar

Additional musicians

- Chip Douglas – bass guitar
- Eddie Hoh – drums
- Bud Brisbois – trumpet
- Virgil Evans – trumpet
- Uan Rasey – trumpet
- Thomas Scott – trumpet
- Bobby Helfer – trumpet, bass clarinet
- Lou Blackburn – trombone
- Dick Nash – trombone
- Dick Leith – bass trombone
- Phil Teele – bass trombone
- Buddy Collette – saxophone
- Bill Hood – saxophone
- Plas Johnson – saxophone
- John Lowe – bass saxophone, bass clarinet

Technical

- Shorty Rogers – arrangement
- Chip Douglas – producer
