= 20th Anniversary Tour =

20th Anniversary Tour may refer to:

- 20th Anniversary Tour (Blink-182)
- 20th Anniversary Tour (Candlebox)
- 20th Anniversary Tour 1986 (The Monkees)
