= Barrelful of Monkees: Monkees Songs for Kids! =

Barrelful of Monkees: Monkees Songs For Kids!

Compilation album by the Monkees
- Released: March 12, 1996
- Recorded: 1966–1991
- Genre: Rock
- Length: 29:22
- Label: Rhino
- Producer: Various

The Monkees chronology
Greatest Hits (1995)	Barrelful of Monkees: Monkees Songs For Kids! (1996)	Missing Links Volume Three (1996)

Professional ratings
Review scores
Source	Rating
Allmusic	2/5 stars

Barrelful of Monkees: Monkees Songs For Kids! is a 1996 compilation album of songs by the Monkees, released by Rhino Records on their Kid Rhino record label and intended especially for children.

== Track listing ==
1. "(Theme From) The Monkees" (from the 1966 album The Monkees, stereo mix)
2. "Gonna Buy Me a Dog" (from the 1966 album The Monkees, stereo mix)
3. "Apples, Peaches, Bananas and Pears" (from the 1987 album Missing Links, stereo mix)
4. "Your Auntie Grizelda" (from the 1967 album More Of The Monkees, stereo mix)
5. "Teeny Tiny Gnome" (from the 1987 album Missing Links, stereo mix)
6. "Porpoise Song" (from the 1991 album Micky Dolenz Puts You To Sleep)
7. "The Poster" (from the 1968 album The Birds, The Bees & The Monkees, stereo mix)
8. "Papa Gene's Blues" (from the 1966 album The Monkees, stereo mix)
9. "I Can't Get Her Off My Mind" (from the 1967 album Headquarters, stereo mix)
10. "Saturday's Child" (from the 1966 album The Monkees, stereo mix)
11. "Laugh" (from the 1967 album More Of The Monkees, stereo mix)
12. "Pillow Time" (from the 1969 album The Monkees Present, stereo mix)
