= Daily Nightly =

Song by the Monkees

from the album Pisces, Aquarius, Capricorn & Jones Ltd.
- Released: November 6, 1967
- Genre: Psychedelic pop
- Length: 2:33
- Label: Colgems 66-1007 / RCA 1620
- Songwriter: Mike Nesmith
- Producer: Chip Douglas

"Daily Nightly" is a song by Michael Nesmith of the Monkees, which appeared on their fourth album, Pisces, Aquarius, Capricorn & Jones Ltd., in 1967, and was featured in two second-season episodes of their television series, "A Fairy Tale" and "Monkees Blow Their Minds".

The lyrics are a veiled commentary on the Sunset Strip curfew riots, which occurred in Hollywood, California in late 1966. The record was arguably the very first rock recording to feature the Moog synthesizer, programmed by musician Paul Beaver and played by Micky Dolenz, who was an early owner of a Moog. The fills Dolenz played were described as "spacey UFO noises", and were characteristic of psychedelic music, which was then in vogue. The Moog sections were significantly different between the stereo and mono mixes of the track. Dolenz also provided the vocals. A music video in black and white was made for the series, with Dolenz miming his performance.

The song is simple musically, using the chords A Major, C Major, D Major, and E Major.

The song appears on the third CD of the 2009 Rhino compilation Where the Action Is! Los Angeles Nuggets 1965–1968.

== Live versions ==
The song was a regular inclusion in the setlist of the 2012 "An Evening with the Monkees" tour featuring Nesmith, Dolenz, & Peter Tork. During the song, Nesmith vocally performed an interpretation of the original Moog sound effects. According to Dolenz, the song was never performed live prior to 2012.

== Personnel ==
Credits adapted from 2007 Rhino "Deluxe Edition" CD

The Monkees

- Micky Dolenz - lead vocals, Moog synthesizer
- Michael Nesmith - electric guitar
- Peter Tork - Hammond organ

Additional musicians

- Chip Douglas - bass guitar; producer
- Eddie Hoh - drums
