= Pisces, Aquarius, Capricorn & Jones Ltd. =

Studio album by the Monkees
- Released: November 14, 1967
- Recorded: April 26 – October 9, 1967
- Studios: RCA Victor (Hollywood); RCA Victor (New York); Western Recorders, No. 1 (Hollywood); American Recording Company (Studio City); United Recorders, A (Hollywood)
- Genres: Pop; rock; psychedelic rock
- Length: 35:44
- Label: Colgems
- Producer: Chip Douglas

The Monkees chronology
Headquarters (1967)	Pisces, Aquarius, Capricorn & Jones Ltd. (1967)	The Birds, the Bees & the Monkees (1968)

Singles from Pisces, Aquarius, Capricorn & Jones Ltd.
- 1. "Pleasant Valley Sunday" / "Words" Released: July 10, 1967

Pisces, Aquarius, Capricorn & Jones Ltd. is the fourth album by the Monkees. It was released on November 14, 1967, during a period when the band exerted more control over their music and performed many of the instruments themselves (previously forbidden by Colgems Records). However, although the group had complete artistic control over the proceedings, they invited more outside contributions than on their previous album, Headquarters, and used session musicians to complement their sound. The album also featured one of the first uses of the Moog synthesizer in popular music. Pisces, Aquarius, Capricorn & Jones Ltd. sold over three million copies, becoming the band's fourth consecutive album to reach No. 1 on the U.S. Billboard 200.

== Background ==
By early 1967, the Monkees had become one of the most commercially successful pop acts in the United States, with several hit singles and albums promoted through their television series, The Monkees. Their popularity, however, was tempered by criticism from the emerging rock press and the counterculture audience after it was revealed that the group had not played the instruments on their first two albums.

In February 1967, Don Kirshner, who had overseen the group's musical output, was dismissed by Colgems Records after attempting to release the single "A Little Bit Me, a Little Bit You" without the band's approval. Following Kirshner's departure, the Monkees gained creative control and recorded their third album, Headquarters, with the four members playing most of the instruments and contributing original compositions. The album reached number one on the U.S. charts but was displaced after one week by The Beatles' Sgt. Pepper's Lonely Hearts Club Band.

The Monkees subsequently moved toward psychedelic and experimental sounds for their next album. Elements of psychedelia had already appeared in earlier recordings such as "Take a Giant Step" and "Words," the latter of which was re-recorded for the new project. Around the same time, Peter Tork and Micky Dolenz attended the Monterey International Pop Festival in June 1967. Dolenz's appearance wearing a Native American feathered headdress was reported in the press and later cited in accounts of the festival, reflecting the group's association with the countercultural scene.

After experiencing difficulty during the recording of Headquarters, Dolenz chose to step away from drumming duties, leading producer Chip Douglas to bring in session musician Eddie Hoh for percussion. Douglas himself played bass on many tracks. The resulting album featured a hybrid of members of the group and session players on instrumentation; similarly, contributions from professional songwriters blended with original material by Michael Nesmith and other group members. As with Headquarters, the Monkees selected the material themselves.

== Recording ==
Recording sessions for Pisces, Aquarius, Capricorn & Jones Ltd. began at RCA Victor Studios in Hollywood in April 1967, less than two weeks after completion of Headquarters and the start of filming for the second season of The Monkees. On April 26, the group recorded "Cuddly Toy", written by then-unknown Harry Nilsson, with Micky Dolenz performing drums for the only time on this album. (Note: In 1994, Andrew Sandoval reported that "Cuddly Toy" was the last time Dolenz played drums on any Monkees studio track. However, the Monkees would go on to record three albums after 1994, and Dolenz played drums on all of 1996's Justus and on one track from 2016's Good Times!. Dolenz also avers that he was the drummer on the 1969 Monkees track "Mommy and Daddy".) While the song was presented as a lighthearted music hall number, it drew attention from Screen Gems executives when they discovered its lyrics were suggestive of a Hell's Angels gang-bang. The royalties from this composition enabled Nilsson to leave his bank job and pursue music full-time.

On May 29, the basic track for Bill Martin's folky anti-war statement "The Door Into Summer" was recorded, initially with Dolenz on lead before Michael Nesmith replaced him. Nesmith ultimately sang lead on five tracks for the album, more than any other member. On June 10, one day after the group's performance at the Hollywood Bowl, they recorded "Pleasant Valley Sunday", written by Gerry Goffin and Carole King and earmarked for their next single. The distinctive guitar riff, inspired by the Beatles' "I Want to Tell You", was created by producer Chip Douglas and played by Nesmith, while the arrangement incorporated psychedelic reverb effects. That same day, Peter Tork recorded the spoken-word interlude "Peter Percival Patterson's Pet Pig Porky", which directly preceded "Pleasant Valley Sunday" on the album. "Pleasant Valley Sunday" was then finished with overdubs of congas, guitars, and vocals on the 11th and 13th.

On June 14, the group re-recorded "Words", a track first attempted in late 1966 with session musicians for More of the Monkees and aired on the episode "Monkees in Manhattan" during the first season of the television show. The new version featured a Hammond organ solo by Tork and was later released as the B-side to "Pleasant Valley Sunday", peaking at No. 11 on the Billboard Hot 100. On the same day, the band recorded backing tracks for Craig Smith's "Salesman" and John Stewart's "Daydream Believer". While "Daydream Believer" was held, according to Douglas, as an "ace in the hole" for the group's next album, "Salesman" was included on Pisces despite concerns from NBC executives that its lyrics referenced drug use.

Following Dolenz and Tork's return from the Monterey International Pop Festival, sessions resumed on June 19 with Nesmith's "Daily Nightly" and "Love Is Only Sleeping" by Barry Mann and Cynthia Weil. "Daily Nightly", inspired by the burning of Pandora's Box during the 1966 Sunset Strip riots, featured Dolenz on lead vocal. "Love Is Only Sleeping" was considered for single release in October 1967 but replaced by "Daydream Believer" after manufacturing delays led Colgems to change their minds.

On June 20, Nesmith recorded "Don't Call on Me", a pre-Monkees composition styled as a send up of a lounge ballad, and introduced "What Am I Doing Hangin' 'Round?" by Michael Martin Murphey and Owen Castleman (as "Lewis & Clark"). The latter track emphasized Nesmith's interest in country-rock and featured unusual chord changes along with electric banjo by Doug Dillard, meant to differ from traditional country music. On June 21, the band worked on "Goin' Down", developed from a jam on Mose Allison's "Parchman Farm", with a new melody and lyrics co-written by Diane Hildebrand and re-recorded "She Hangs Out", which had been previously cut with session musicians under Don Kirshner in January 1967 and briefly released in Canada as the B-side to "A Little Bit Me, A Little Bit You" before being pulled. The re-recorded version featured horns in a slower, funk-influenced arrangement. On June 22, the band recorded the Goffin/King song "Star Collector", referencing the new groupie phenomenon. Originally meant as a two-and-a-half-minute song, the closing jam went on for three more minutes over which Dolenz suggested they add sounds from the Moog synthesizer he had recently purchased, eventually added by Paul Beaver.

The later sessions were interspersed with summer tour dates and made use of newly available eight-track technology, which allowed for more overdubs. July 5 was dedicated to further work on "Goin' Down", while brass was also added to "She Hangs Out" in New York on August 17. Davy Jones's lead vocal for "Daydream Believer" was recorded on August 9 at RCA Studio A in Nashville, while Nesmith completed vocals for "Don't Call on Me" the same day. On August 23, further overdubs were added to "The Door Into Summer" while Jones recorded "Hard to Believe" with musician Kim Capli, who overdubbed multiple instruments before orchestral parts were added on September 15. "Hard to Believe" was the first "Broadway rock" number from Jones, a type of song that would appear on all of the group's future albums.

During September and October, "Goin' Down" was completed in Hollywood with lead vocals and brass. Finally, extensive Moog synthesizer overdubs were added to "Daily Nightly" and "Star Collector", the former played by Micky Dolenz at Western Recorders on October 4 while Paul Beaver overdubbed Moog parts for "Star Collector". Peter Tork later expressed his opinion that Micky's playing was more organic: "Micky's Moog part on "Daily Nightly" was – I thought – brilliant. Another example of his intense creativity, when he was into it. He just made the Moog stand up and speak. Paul thought it was a flute or something. He was sort of out there musically, but still within normal harmonic bounds."

Other songs attempted but not included on the album included Goffin/King's "A Man Without a Dream" (later issued on Instant Replay), Tork's "The Love Song from Tippy the Toiler", Linzer and Randell's "I'll Be Back Up on My Feet" (later re-recorded for The Birds, the Bees & the Monkees), and Mann/Weil's "I'm a Man".

== Title and artwork ==
The album's title stems from each band member's respective astrological sign: Micky Dolenz is Pisces, Peter Tork is Aquarius, and both Mike Nesmith and Davy Jones are Capricorn.

The album's cover features a drawing of the four Monkees by Bernard Yeszin, their facial features blank and standing in a field of watercolored flowers, with the group's iconic guitar logo half-buried. The flowers were meant to represent the flower-power movement which was big at the time, while the choice of silhouetting their faces was, according to Yeszin, because "The Monkees were so popular and so hot at the time...that I could do just about anything that reminded you of The Monkees. I could do an album cover and just show their outline and people would identify them. People would know they were The Monkees." Later reissues of the album use a retraced version of the cover by Lisa Sutton, as the original prints no longer existed.

== Release ==
The album was preceded by the release of "Pleasant Valley Sunday" backed with "Words" on July 10, 1967. The single reached number three and number eleven on the Billboard Hot 100 respectively. "Daydream Believer" backed with "Goin' Down", recorded during the same sessions and issued on October 25, became the group's final U.S. number one single, although the A-side was reserved for the following album, The Birds, the Bees & the Monkees.

Pisces, Aquarius, Capricorn & Jones Ltd. was released on November 14, 1967. After entering the Billboard 200 at number 29, it rose to number one the following week, remaining in that position for five consecutive weeks and eventually selling more than three million copies. Producer Chip Douglas later remarked that sales might have been even greater if "Daydream Believer" had been included on the album as originally intended. In the United Kingdom, the album was released in January 1968 and peaked at number five on the UK Albums Chart.

In 2007, Rhino Entertainment issued a two-disc deluxe edition of the album. The release reproduced the original Colgems artwork and labels, and included a booklet with essays and detailed recording notes by historian Andrew Sandoval. The set contained remastered mono and stereo mixes, as well as alternate versions and outtakes.

In 2025, Rhino issued a four-disc super deluxe edition of the album, featuring the original mono and stereo mixes, newly created stereo mixes, TV mixes, demos, outtakes, backing tracks, a 32-page booklet with notes by Sandoval and an additional 7-inch single featuring alternate mono mixes of "Love Is Only Sleeping" and "Goin' Down". In 2026, the album's super deluxe edition received a Grammy nomination for Best Album Notes.

== Critical reception ==
Professional ratings
Review scores
Source	Rating
AllMusic	4.5/5 stars
MusicHound	3/5 stars
Record Collector	4/5 stars
The Rolling Stone Album Guide	1.5/5 stars
The Wire	(favorable)

At the time of release, trade publications reviewed the album favorably. Billboard highlighted "Salesman" and "What Am I Doing Hangin' Round?" as "topnotch" selections, while Cashbox described the record as a "sure to please powerhouse," with both predicting chart success. In the United Kingdom, Allen Evans of NME gave a track-by-track review, noting "Cuddly Toy" and "What Am I Doing Hangin' Round?" as standout tracks.

The emerging counterculture press did not cover the album, and it was not reviewed by Rolling Stone or Crawdaddy. In the 2004 edition of The Rolling Stone Album Guide the album received one-and-a-half stars.

Later assessments have been more positive. AllMusic critic Tim Sendra wrote that "not only is it one of the Monkees' best, it is one of 1967's best," describing it as "a must-have for any fan of smart, fun, and exciting '60s pop." Record Collector praised the album as "a pop-psych triumph with Americana signposts" and "the real challenger to the Beatles," citing "Pleasant Valley Sunday" and "Daily Nightly" as highlights.

== Legacy and influence ==
Pisces, Aquarius, Capricorn & Jones Ltd. has been noted for its innovations in both instrumentation and style. The album is among the earliest pop records to feature the Moog synthesizer, which Dolenz introduced to the group; he owned one of the first twenty ever sold. The instrument was played by Dolenz on "Daily Nightly" and by Beaver on "Star Collector." Critics have highlighted the album's use of the Moog as one of the first appearances of the instrument on a rock recording.

The album is also regarded as a precursor to country rock, particularly through Michael Nesmith's "What Am I Doing Hangin' 'Round?", which featured electric banjo by Doug Dillard. Music historian Richie Unterberger observed that the track anticipated the fusion of country and rock later popularized by groups such as The Byrds and The Flying Burrito Brothers.

Within the Monkees' catalog, Pisces is often cited as a creative high point, balancing commercial success with greater artistic control compared to their earlier releases. It has been described as an exemplar of 1960s psychedelic pop and as a significant step in the band's transition from a television-based act to a self-directed recording group. The album has remained one of the Monkees' best-selling works, achieving multi-platinum status in the United States and continuing to appear in retrospective rankings of the group's most significant releases.

== Track listing ==
Side one
No.	Title	Writer(s)	Lead vocals	Length
1.	"Salesman"	Craig Vincent Smith	Michael Nesmith	2:37
2.	"She Hangs Out"	Jeff Barry, Ellie Greenwich, Jerry Leiber, Mike Stoller	Davy Jones	2:57
3.	"The Door into Summer"	Chip Douglas, Bill Martin	Nesmith, with Micky Dolenz	2:49
4.	"Love Is Only Sleeping"	Barry Mann, Cynthia Weil	Nesmith	2:31
5.	"Cuddly Toy"	Harry Nilsson	Jones	2:38
6.	"Words"	Tommy Boyce, Bobby Hart	Dolenz with Peter Tork	2:52

Side two
No.	Title	Writer(s)	Lead vocals	Length
1.	"Hard to Believe"	Jones, Kim Capli, Eddie Brick, Charlie Rockett	Jones	2:37
2.	"What Am I Doing Hangin' 'Round?"	Lewis, Clarke	Nesmith	3:09
3.	"Peter Percival Patterson's Pet Pig Porky"	Tork	Tork	0:27
4.	"Pleasant Valley Sunday"	Gerry Goffin, Carole King	Dolenz	3:15
5.	"Daily Nightly"	Nesmith	Dolenz	2:33
6.	"Don't Call on Me"	Nesmith, John London	Nesmith	2:51
7.	"Star Collector"	Goffin, King	Jones	4:28

=== Aborted track listing ===
The original track lineup for the album, compiled on October 9, 1967, included the following songs:

1. "Special Announcement"
2. "She Hangs Out"
3. "Salesman"
4. "Cuddly Toy"
5. "Words"
6. "Don't Call on Me"
7. "Goin' Down"

Side two

1. "The Door Into Summer"
2. "Hard to Believe"
3. "What Am I Doing Hangin' 'Round?"
4. "Daily Nightly"
5. "Peter Percival Patterson's Pet Pig Porky"
6. "Pleasant Valley Sunday"
7. "Star Collector"

== Personnel ==
Credits adapted from 2007 Rhino "Deluxe Edition" CD, except where noted.

The Monkees

- Michael Nesmith – lead vocals (1, 3–4, 8, 12), guitar (1, 4, 8, 11–13), shaker (1), electric guitar (2, 10), acoustic guitar (5), tremolo electric guitar (6), percussion (6), backing vocals (6, 10)
- Micky Dolenz – percussion (1), backing vocals (1–2, 4–5, 8, 13), harmony vocals (3, 5, 13), drums (5), lead vocals (6, 10–11), Moog synthesizer (11), intro chatter (12)
- Davy Jones – percussion (1, 6), backing vocals (1–2, 4–5, 8, 10–11, 13), lead vocals (2, 5, 7, 13), tambourine (4–5), intro chatter (12)
- Peter Tork – organ (2, 4–6, 11–13), keyboards (3, 5), backing vocals (5, 10), lead vocals (6), spoken word (9), piano (10)

Additional musicians

- Chip Douglas – nylon-string guitar (1), bass guitar (1–6, 8, 10–13), backing vocals (2, 4–6, 8, 13), guitar (3), acoustic guitar (12)
- Eddie Hoh – drums (1–4, 6, 8, 10–13), percussion (10), claves (12)
- Pete Candoli – trumpet (2)
- Al Porcino – trumpet (2)
- Manny Stevens – trumpet (2)
- Dick Noel – trombone (2)
- Dick Leith – bass trombone (2)
- Philip Teele – bass trombone (2)
- Ted Nash – reeds (5), winds (5)
- Tom Scott – reeds (5), winds (5)
- Bud Shank – reeds (5), winds (5)
- Edgar Lustgarten – cello (5)
- Kim Capli – guitar (7), piano (7), bass guitar (7), drums (7), shaker (7), cowbell (7), claves (7), other percussion (7)
- Vincent DeRosa – French horn (7)
- Ollie Mitchell – flugelhorn (7)
- Anthony Terran – flugelhorn (7)
- Bobby Knight – bass trombone (7)
- Jim Horn – baritone sax (7)
- Leonard Atkins – violin (7)
- Arnold Belnick – violin (7)
- Nathan Kaproff – violin (7)
- Wilbert Nuttycombe – violin (7)
- Jerome Reisler – violin (7)
- Darrel Terwilliger – violin (7)
- Doug Dillard – banjo (8)
- Bill Chadwick – acoustic guitar (10)
- Bob Rafelson – piano intro (12)
- Bill Martin – intro chatter (12)
- Charlie Rockett – intro chatter (12)
- Paul Beaver – Moog synthesizer (13)

Technical

- Chip Douglas – producer
- Lester Sill – music supervisor
- Hank Cicalo – recording engineer
- Pete Abbott – recording engineer
- Richie Schmitt – recording engineer
- Bernard Yeszin – cover design
- Roger Farris – arranger (7)
- George Tipton – orchestrator (7)

== Chart positions ==
=== Album ===
Chart (1967)	Peak position
Canadian Albums (RPM)	2
French Albums (SNEP)	3
German Albums (Offizielle Top 100)	18
Norwegian Albums (VG-lista)	4
UK Albums (OCC)	5
US Billboard 200	1

=== Single ===
Year	Single	Chart	Peak position
1967	"Words"	Billboard Hot 100	11
1967	"Pleasant Valley Sunday"	Billboard Hot 100	3

== Certifications ==
Region	Certification	Certified units/sales
United States (RIAA)	2× Platinum	2,000,000^{^}
^{^} Shipments figures based on certification alone.
