= Outrageous (Kim Fowley album) =

Studio album by Kim Fowley
- Released: 1968
- Genre: Psychedelic rock
- Length: 36:18
- Label: Imperial
- Producer: Kim Fowley

Kim Fowley chronology
Born to Be Wild (1968)	Outrageous (1968)	Good Clean Fun (1969)

Outrageous is the third album by American singer-songwriter Kim Fowley, released in 1968 through Imperial Records.

== Release and reception ==
Professional ratings
Review scores
Source	Rating
Allmusic	3/5 stars
Robert Christgau	E

Outrageous is perhaps the most renowned of Fowley's solo output and is his only album to chart on the United States' Billboard 200. In January 2003 Julian Cope selected it as the album of the month, calling it "a shamanic rock’n’roll album made by the ultimate chancer/huckster/gleeman." Rob Fitzpatrick of the Guardian named the album one of the "101 strangest records on Spotify," writing that:

The album sounds like Fowley himself was off his chump on weapons-grade pharmaceuticals – he rants, raves, seethes, spits, burps, curses, declaims, screams and hollers his way across a heavily psychedelic set of knuckle-scraping rock-outs that recall a post-lobotomy Doors attempting an MC5 b-side while piled in the back of a inexpertly driven truck. On ice. And drugs. On the moon.

Less enthusiastic was music journalist Robert Christgau, who rated it "E", his second-worst rating (on a scale of A+ to E−), and stated, "I don't understand how he continues to earn a living, but he does." (Fowley eventually did earn an E− from Christgau for his 1972 release I'm Bad.)

== Track listing ==
All tracks are written by Kim Fowley, except "Animal Man" and "Bubble Gum" co-written by Marty Cerf.

Side one
No.	Title	Length
1.	"Animal Man"	2:37
2.	"Wildfire"	4:00
3.	"Hide and Seek"	2:07
4.	"Chinese Water Torture"	0:43
5.	"Nightrider"	2:16
6.	"Bubble Gum"	2:45

Side two
No.	Title	Length
1.	"Inner Space Discovery"	4:05
2.	"Barefoot Country Boy"	2:00
3.	"Up"	4:05
4.	"Caught in the Middle"	5:40
5.	"Down"	5:00
6.	"California Hayride"	1:10

== Chart positions ==
Charts (1969)	Peak position
US Billboard 200	198

== Personnel ==
Musicians

- Kim Fowley – additional vocals, keyboards, record producer
- Michael Allsup – guitar
- Ben "Blues" Benay – guitar, harmonica
- Mars Bonfire – guitar
- Jimmy Greenspoon – keyboards
- Eddie Hoh – percussion
- Orville "Red" Rhodes – steel guitar
- Carmen Riale – bass guitar
- Joe Schermie – bass guitar
- Wayne Talbert – keyboards
- Joe Torres – percussion

Production and additional personnel

- David Brand – engineering
- Ed Caraeff – photography
- Bruce Ellison – engineering
- Gabor Halmos – design
- Woody Woodward – art direction
