= Words (The Monkees song) =

Single by the Monkees

from the album Pisces, Aquarius, Capricorn & Jones Ltd.
- A-side: "Pleasant Valley Sunday"
- Released: July 10, 1967
- Recorded: August 15, 27, 1966 (first version); June 14, 1967 (second version)
- Studio: RCA Victor (Hollywood, California)
- Genre: Psychedelic pop
- Label: Colgems
- Songwriters: Tommy Boyce; Bobby Hart
- Producers: Boyce and Hart (first version); Chip Douglas (second version)

The Monkees singles chronology
| "A Little Bit Me, a Little Bit You" (1967) | "Words" (1967) | "Daydream Believer" (1967) |

"Words" is a song written by Tommy Boyce and Bobby Hart and recorded by the Monkees. An early version by the Leaves appeared on their 1966 album Hey Joe. The Monkees first recorded the song for their second album, More of The Monkees, in August 1966, under the supervision of Boyce and Hart. While this version went unreleased until the 1990 compilation Missing Links Volume Two, it was featured in the April 10, 1967, episode of The Monkees TV show, "Monkees, Manhattan Style". A new version of the song was made to be the B-side of "Pleasant Valley Sunday" in 1967, produced by Chip Douglas. It also appeared on the band's album Pisces, Aquarius, Capricorn & Jones Ltd. later that year.

Micky Dolenz shared lead vocals with Peter Tork on both versions of the song. The B-side peaked at No. 11 on the Billboard Hot 100, marking the band's highest-charting song with vocals by Tork.

== Background ==
In Pisces, Aquarius, Capricorn & Jones Ltd.'s liner notes, co-writer Tommy Boyce recalled that the song's inspiration was a letter that he and Bobby Hart had received from a lonely girl that they invited to a hayride after an appearance on American Bandstand show two weeks before: "Tommy and Bobby, WORDS can never express how nice you two were to me at the hayride". In contrast with the thankful tone of the letter, the song tells about the imminent break-up between the narrator and his girlfriend after discovering that she used "words with lies inside".

== Recording ==
=== First version ===
In the episode "Monkees in Manhattan", drummer Micky Dolenz, singer Davy Jones, guitarist Michael Nesmith and bassist Peter Tork's roles are swapped to perform "Words". L-R: Dolenz, Tork, Jones and Nesmith.

The first version was recorded in the More of The Monkees sessions. At this time, the Monkees were merely singers adding their vocals to songs with backing tracks played by session musicians to The Monkees TV show. Monkee Micky Dolenz, who had already sung lead in "Last Train to Clarksville" and most of their eponymous debut album, served as lead vocalist again in this song, accompanied by fellow member Peter Tork on the verses. The backing vocals were recorded by Dolenz, Tork, Davy Jones, Boyce, Hart and others.

Boyce and Hart were their producers and songwriters at the time and arranged a number of session musicians to play on the record, including Wayne Erwin on guitar (who also did backing vocals), Larry Taylor on bass, and Billy Lewis on drums, also featuring a flute solo by Ethmer Roten.

This version was aired during an episode of the first season of the series, "Monkees in Manhattan", showing a musical performance of the group with Jones (frontman) on drums, Tork (bassist) playing lead guitar, Michael Nesmith (guitarist) on bass, and Dolenz (drummer) fronting the group.

=== Second version ===
After they achieved their independence to record their own music, the Monkees re-recorded the song, now with the involvement of Monkees guitarist Nesmith and produced by Chip Douglas. The group now played on the record, along with Douglas on bass and Eddie Hoh on drums.

There are few differences between the first and the second version, with the clearest being Tork's Hammond organ solo in place of Ethmer Roten's flute.

== Release ==
The song was released as the B-side of "Pleasant Valley Sunday" in 1967, that peaked at No. 3 on the Billboard Hot 100 charts. "Words" also charted on its own right, peaking at No. 11 in September 2. The single (second) version was used in rebroadcast of the episodes "Monkees in a Ghost Town" and "Monkees Chow Mein" in the first season of The Monkees TV show; then used in the second season episodes "Monkees in Texas" and "Monkees' Paw" while the original version was used in the episode "Monkees in Manhattan".

The single version was included on the album Pisces, Aquarius, Capricorn & Jones Ltd., released the same year, while the first version was later put on the 1990 compilation album Missing Links Volume Two.

== Charts ==
| Chart (1967–1968) | Peak position |
|---|---|
| Canadian RPM Top Singles | 57 |
| U.S. Billboard Hot 100 | 11 |
| U.S. Cash Box Top 100 Singles | 5 |
| U.S. Record World Singles Chart | 14 |
| Venezuela | 7 |

== Personnel ==
=== First version ===
- Micky Dolenz – lead and backing vocals
- Peter Tork – co-lead and backing vocals
- Davy Jones, Tommy Boyce, Bobby Hart, Ron Hicklin – backing vocals
- Wayne Erwin – guitar, backing vocals
- Gerry McGee, Louie Shelton – guitar
- Larry Taylor – bass guitar
- Billy Lewis – drums
- Norm Jeffries – percussion
- Ethmer Roten – flute

=== Second version ===
- Micky Dolenz – co-lead vocals
- Peter Tork – co-lead vocals, Hammond organ
- Michael Nesmith – tremolo electric guitar, percussion, backing vocals
- Davy Jones – chimes, backing vocals
- Chip Douglas – bass guitar
- Eddie Hoh – drums
