= Zor and Zam =

Song by The Monkees

from the album The Birds, The Bees & The Monkees
- Language: English
- Released: April 22, 1968
- Recorded: January 7, 13, 18 and February 14, 17, 1968
- Genre: Pop rock
- Length: 2:10
- Label: Colgems
- Songwriters: Bill and John Chadwick
- Producer: The Monkees

"Zor and Zam" is a song written by Bill and John Chadwick and recorded by the American pop rock group The Monkees for their 1968 album The Birds, The Bees & The Monkees. It was also featured in the final episode of season 2 of the band's popular television series, entitled "The Frodis Caper" (aka "Mijacogeo"). The song involves the preparations for a war between two monarchs of rival kingdoms; however, when it comes time to fight, no one shows up and the war never happens.

The song appeared in a markedly different mix on the television show than it did on The Birds, The Bees & The Monkees, featuring an alternate vocal take, and lacking the horn and string overdubs.

== Personnel ==
- Micky Dolenz – lead vocal, percussion
- Keith Allison, Bill Chadwick – electric guitars
- Chip Douglas, Richard Dey, Max Bennett – bass
- Michael Melvoin – piano
- Eddie Hoh – drums
- Hal Blaine, Milt Holland, Stan Levey – drums, percussion, gong, timpani
- Henry Diltz – percussion
- Milt Bernhart, Richard Leith, Lew McCreary, Frank Rosolino – trombones
- Buddy Childers, Clyde Reasinger, Jack Sheldon, Anthony Terran – trumpets
- Nathan Kaproff, George Kast, Marvin Limonick, Alex Murray, Erno Neufeld, Ambrose Russo – violins
- John Lowe – saxophone, woodwind
- Shorty Rogers – arrangement

== See also ==
- List of anti-war songs
