= Star Collector =

Song performed by The Monkees

Song by The Monkees

from the album Pisces, Aquarius, Capricorn & Jones Ltd.
- Released: November 6, 1967
- Genre: Psychedelic rock, experimental rock, acid rock, psychedelic pop
- Length: 4:28
- Label: Colgems 66-1007 / RCA 1620
- Songwriters: Gerry Goffin, Carole King
- Producer: Chip Douglas

"Star Collector" is a song written by Gerry Goffin and Carole King in 1967 and recorded by The Monkees (with lead vocals by Davy Jones). The song is included on their fourth album Pisces, Aquarius, Capricorn & Jones Ltd. It was featured in five second-season episodes of their television series: "The Wild Monkees", "Hitting the High Seas", "Monkees Watch Their Feet", "Monkees in Paris" and "Monkees Mind Their Manor". "The Wild Monkees" uses an early mix of the song (without Moog synthesizer), and the other episodes use the released mix.

The song is about the phenomenon of groupies and takes a dismissive attitude toward them ("Think I'll let her keep on going, wherever it is she's going to / Give her an autograph and tell her 'It's been nice knowing you'...It won't take much time / Before I get her off my mind").

The Monkees's version of the song was one of the early pop records to include a Moog synthesizer, played and programmed by synthesist Paul Beaver. Peter Tork didn't think much of Beaver's performance and told Rhino Records later, "He played it like it was a flute or something," preferring Micky Dolenz's random use of the Moog on "Daily Nightly" (which appeared on Pisces) to produce spacey sounds.

== Personnel ==
Credits adapted from 2007 Rhino "Deluxe Edition" CD

The Monkees

- Davy Jones - lead and backing vocals
- Micky Dolenz - harmony and backing vocals, spoken word
- Michael Nesmith - electric guitar
- Peter Tork - Hammond organ

Additional musicians

- Paul Beaver - Moog synthesizer
- Chip Douglas - bass guitar, backing vocals
- Eddie Hoh - drums, cowbell
- Unknown - percussion
