= Eddie Hoh =

American drummer (1944–2015)

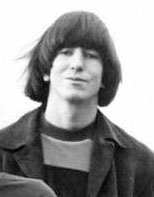
- Hoh in 1966

Background information
- Also known as: "Fast" Eddie Hoh
- Born: October 16, 1944
- Origin: Forest Park, Illinois, U.S.
- Died: November 7, 2015 (aged 71) Westmont, Illinois, U.S.
- Genres: Rock
- Occupation: Drummer
- Years active: 1964–1970

Edward Hoh (October 16, 1944 – November 7, 2015) was an American rock drummer who was active in the 1960s. Although primarily a studio session and touring drummer, Hoh exhibited a degree of originality and showmanship that set him apart and several of his contributions have been singled out for acknowledgment by music critics.

Often uncredited and unknown to audiences, he played the drums on several well-known rock songs and albums, including those by Donovan and the Monkees. He also performed at the seminal 1967 Monterey Pop Festival as a member of the Mamas and the Papas touring band. In 1968, he participated in the recording of Super Session, the highly successful 1968 Mike Bloomfield/Al Kooper/Stephen Stills collaboration album. However, his flurry of activity came to an end by the early 1970s and he remained out of the public eye until his death in 2015.

== Early career ==
Hoh was born and raised in Forest Park, Illinois, a western suburb of Chicago. While a teenager, he played with several local bands and met area musicians Michael Bloomfield and Barry Goldberg. After Hoh relocated to Los Angeles in 1964, he became known on the club circuit and drummed for the Joel Scott Hill groups the Strangers and the Invaders. Hill recorded several singles and the Strangers were an opening act for the 1964 T.A.M.I. Show, headlined by the Rolling Stones and James Brown. However, they did not appear in the concert film and it is unknown if Hoh recorded with Hill. (Note: Other musicians associated with the Strangers include John Barbata, Bob Mosley, and Lee Michaels.)

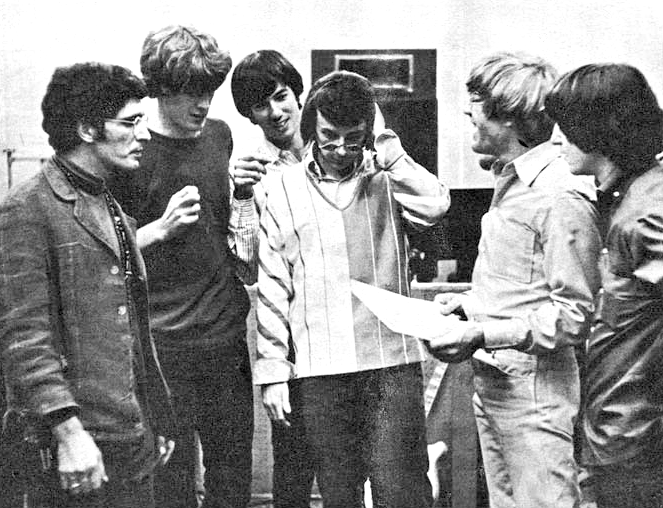
Hoh with the MFQ and Phil Spector at Gold Star Studios in 1965 (from left to right): Faryar, Yester, Douglas, Spector, Diltz, Hoh.

In September 1965, Hoh joined members of the Modern Folk Quartet as the group was venturing into electric folk rock. Jerry Yester, Cyrus Faryar, Henry "Tad" Diltz, and Chip Douglas made up the quartet and each became involved in various aspects of the music industry and Hoh's career. The group was renamed the Modern Folk Quintet (usually shortened to MFQ), and Phil Spector decided to become their producer. Despite a lot of time spent with Spector in rehearsals and recording at Gold Star Studios, only one song came out of their association, "This Could Be the Night". To the group's dismay, it was not issued as a single, but was used as the theme to The Big T.N.T. Show, the 1965 follow-up concert film to the T.A.M.I. Show. (Note: "This Could Be the Night" finally appeared on a 1976 compilation album Phil Spector Wall of Sound Vol. 6 — Rare Masters Vol. 2 and later included on Spector's 1991 Back to Mono (1958–1969) retrospective.) In March 1966, MFQ recorded a single for Dunhill Records, produced by Spector associate Jack Nitzsche. The song "Night Time Girl", written by Al Kooper and Irwin Levine, reached number 122 on Billboard magazine's Bubbling Under Hot 100 Singles on April 16, 1966. A second Dunhill MFQ single, the double A-side "Don't You Wonder" backed with "I Had a Dream Last Night", was released in 1968, but Hoh's participation is unknown. The MFQ were a fixture on the Los Angeles club scene and opened for such groups as the Paul Butterfield Blues Band, Donovan, the Byrds, Mamas and the Papas, and the Velvet Underground. They undertook a college tour across the U.S., however, a breakthrough eluded them and they disbanded by July 1966.

In 1966, Hoh contributed drums to Scottish singer Donovan's third album, Sunshine Superman. The album was recorded at the CBS studios in Hollywood and included songs such as "Season of the Witch", "Fat Angel", and "The Trip" (the title track was previously recorded in London with a different drummer). Hoh accompanied Donovan during area engagements with ex-MFQ member Cyrus Faryar on electric violin. Donovan's experiences at the Trip club were recounted in "The Trip" and Hoh's "fine drumming" was noted in a review of the song. Sunshine Superman became Donovan's most popular record and reached number eleven in the Billboard 200 album chart.

== 1967 ==
In 1967, Eddie Hoh's recording and touring activities accelerated. In March 1967, he performed with the Byrds' former singer-songwriter Gene Clark. (Note: The live dates with Gene Clark may also include August 1967 (Whisky a Go Go Show List 1966–1970).) Clark, who had recorded a country-influenced album with the Gosdin Brothers, was continuing to develop his country rock sound. With Hoh, guitarist Clarence White, and bassist John York (who both joined the Byrds in 1968), the group appeared at several engagements, including at the Whisky a Go Go and the Golden Bear. However, according to York, Clark was largely indifferent to audiences and the group did not last long:

I remember Eddie, Clarence, and I thinking that Gene had so many great songs, that it would be cool to be playing those songs and not just running through Byrds hits ... We played just a few songs and the audience was basically ignoring us. They were talking loudly and Gene got pissed off. [So] we just did an extended blues and he [Clark] walked off the stage ... That was the end of the show.

Country rock biographer John Einarson writes that Gene Clark's band with Hoh, White, and York never recorded, while a White website indicates that around the same time, they recorded Clark's aborted Columbia single, "The French Girl"/"Only Colombe" (eventually released on Clark's 1991 Echoes album).

Around the same time, Hoh recorded with a studio group named the Giant Sunflower, which included future record producer Val Garay. Their first single, "February Sunshine", was released by two record companies simultaneously in April 1967: Take 6 Records and Ode Records, where it was the first record issued by producer Lou Adler's new record label. Ode won out and "February Sunshine" debuted at number 106 on Billboard's June 3, 1967, extended pop chart. Promoted as a flower power/sunshine pop record, it was followed in October by the second Giant Sunflower single "What's So Good About Goodbye". Without a touring band, a Los Angeles folk-rock group, the Rose Garden (without Hoh), sometimes performed as the "Giant Sunflower" and later recorded "February Sunshine" and two unrecorded Gene Clark compositions for their debut album.

Hoh became a part of the Mamas and the Papas touring group and on June 18, 1967, they appeared as the final act at the Monterey Pop Festival (singer John Philips was one of the event's organizers). Although several songs were filmed, only "California Dreamin'" and "Got a Feelin'" made the final cut of the Monterey Pop concert film. The complete Mamas and the Papas set was released on an album in 1970 and additional film footage was included in The Complete Monterey Pop Festival DVD set in 2002. A review of the album described Hoh's drumming as "first rate". During the extended instrumental introduction to their first song, Eddie Hoh plays an improvised drum part; at the conclusion of their set, Hoh and studio drummer Hal Blaine play in tandem as the singers leave the stage. While touring with the group, Hoh took part in after-hours club jams. Another touring musician recalled

I remember ... going to some club with John [Philips] and Denny [Doherty] and ... Eddie Hoh ... We all jammed ... Eddie Hoh had these luminous drumsticks, and at one point in the show it would go to a black-light or something, and there was just this blur of drumsticks – it was awesome, real showmanship.

Also in June, Hoh recorded the Goodbye and Hello album with experimental folk singer-songwriter Tim Buckley. The album was produced by former MFQ member Jerry Yester, which critic Matthew Greenwald called "a revolutionary album that was a quantum leap for both Tim Buckley and the audience". Greenwald singled out "Once I Was" and "Pleasant Street" as "tracks [that] are easily among the finest example of Buckley's psychedelic/folk vision". Rough outtake material from the album session was released in 1999 on Buckley's Works in Progress. (Note: Hoh sometimes has been listed as a bass player for Works in Progress and other times as the drummer for "The Fiddler".)

Hoh also became the Monkees' studio drummer and played on many of their songs. From their beginning in 1966, producers used a variety of session musicians to record the Monkees' material, including Hal Blaine and several others from the Wrecking Crew. Hoh played drums on the majority of tracks from their fourth album, 1967's Pisces, Aquarius, Capricorn & Jones Ltd., produced by ex-MFQ member Chip Douglas. Hoh also appeared on several songs on the four albums released thereafter, specifically The Birds, the Bees & the Monkees (1968), Head (1968), Instant Replay (1969) and The Monkees Present (1969). Among his contributions are "Pleasant Valley Sunday", both "Daydream Believer" and its jazz-influenced single B-side "Goin' Down", the second studio version of "Words", "Star Collector", which ends with extended improvised drumming, and "Zor and Zam".

== 1968 ==
Super Session back cover with Eddie Hoh near upper-right corner.

In 1968, singer/organist Al Kooper, who was working for Columbia Records after he left Blood, Sweat & Tears, put together a recording session with former Paul Butterfield Blues Band/Electric Flag guitarist Mike Bloomfield. According to Kooper, Bloomfield chose Hoh as the drummer. When Bloomfield was unable to finish the session, Kooper called guitarist Stephen Stills, who was between gigs with Buffalo Springfield and Crosby, Stills & Nash. Upon hearing that Hoh was the drummer, Stills readily agreed, describing Hoh as "an old friend of mine". (Note: One account has Stephen Stills and Neil Young giving Hoh a ride in Young's old hearse, shortly after their arrival in L.A. in 1966 (For What It's Worth).) The resulting album, titled Super Session, became an unlikely hit. The first half of the album features mostly electric blues-style instrumentals with Bloomfield, while the second with Stills is rock oriented with vocals. Hoh and bassist Harvey Brooks are the rhythm section for the whole album (Barry Goldberg contributes electric piano to one song). All of the Super Session participants had performed at the 1967 Monterey Pop Festival – Hoh with the Mamas and the Papas, Kooper as a solo act, Stills with Buffalo Springfield, and Bloomfield, Brooks, and Goldberg with the Electric Flag.

One of the songs with Stills is an eleven-minute version of "Season of the Witch", which Hoh had originally recorded with Donovan in 1966. It became a staple of late-sixties "underground" FM radio and a review of the song noted Hoh's "flawless drumming which laid down as solid a groove as Stills and Kooper could have ever hoped for". Another Kooper/Stills song is a rendition of Willie Cobbs' blues classic "You Don't Love Me". Hoh's drum part is prominent with the heavy use of flanging (a sound processing effect) on the track. Super Session reached number eleven in the album chart and became one of Columbia's best-selling albums of the late 1960s. It was also the best-selling album of both Bloomfield's and Kooper's careers and Stills' first gold record. Although Hoh had already played drums on several well-known songs, he was relatively unknown to audiences. However, with Super Session he acquired a higher public profile, with his name and photograph given equal prominence on the back album cover.

In addition to Super Session, Hoh participated in several album recording sessions for blues-oriented musicians from Chicago, including singer/harmonica player Charlie Musselwhite, guitarist Harvey Mandel, and keyboard player Barry Goldberg. The three had recorded the Stand Back! Here Comes Charley Musselwhite's Southside Band album in 1967. With Hoh and new backing musicians, Musselwhite recorded his second album, Stone Blues. Hoh also contributed drums to the mostly instrumental fusion 1968 album by Mandel, Cristo Redentor, featuring another staple of late-sixties FM radio, "Wade in the Water". As part of the Barry Goldberg Reunion, he was the drummer for There's No Hole in My Soul. Other recordings with Mandel and Goldberg included Mighty Graham Bond, the Goldberg-produced album by the English blues-band leader/organist Graham Bond. (Note: It is unconfirmed if Hoh also played on a second Graham Bond album, Love Is the Law.)

Eddie Hoh also contributed to singer/organist Lee Michaels' debut album Carnival of Life (both he and Michaels earlier played with Joel Scott Hill). When Michaels' album was released, the personnel listing seemed to indicate that Hoh had only recorded one of the songs, "My Friends". However, in an album review, Greenwald described "excellent performances by Michaels and especially drummer Eddie Hoh". (Note: Years later, drummer Dave Potter asserted that he played on all but one song on Carnival of Life; the 1992 Rhino compilation The Lee Michaels Collection seems to confirm this.) Later, Hoh recorded four demos with Richie Furay, Jim Messina, and Rusty Young after their final recordings for Buffalo Springfield. With a new lineup, they became the country rock group Poco, but the material from the demo sessions has not been released. Hoh is also credited with the drums for Kim Fowley's Outrageous album. (Note: It is unknown if Hoh drummed on Fowley's garage/funk rock "Fluffy Turkeys" single, which was released around the same time.)

== 1969 ==
During 1969, Hoh continued to record and perform with Barry Goldberg (Two Jews Blues, Barry Goldberg & Friends, and Recorded Live Barry Goldberg & Friends) and Harvey Mandel (Righteous). Critic Eugene Chadbourne commented in a review of Barry Goldberg & Friends:

Drummer "Fast" Eddie Hoh completely steals the long jam ["I Got to Love My Woman" a.k.a. "I Got a Woman"] with a solo that hints at the mystery of why there are so many people in the music business with the nickname "Fast Eddie", sounding like at least three of them are on-stage playing the drums.

In April, he performed with Mandel at a Mercury Records-sponsored festival called the Flying Bear Medicine Show, portions of which were released on an album by the same name. Also performing at the festival was Tongue and Groove, described as "something of an offshoot of the legendary, but little recorded, early San Francisco hippie group the Charlatans". Hoh contributed drums to their only album, the self-titled Tongue & Groove. He also drummed on What That Is, the 1969 album by rhythm and blues performer Screamin' Jay Hawkins. Hoh joined Judy Henske and Jerry Yester for the songs "Horses on a Stick" and "Charity", which were included on Farewell Aldebaran, the duo's 1969 folk/psychedelic album. (Note: It has been suggested that Hoh played the drums on "Silver Threads and Golden Needles" or other songs for Linda Ronstadt's 1969 Hand Sown ... Home Grown album, but it remains unconfirmed.)

Goldberg and Hoh participated in a demo session with ex-Sweetheart of the Rodeo-Byrds Gram Parsons, who was looking to form a new country rock group. The session yielded a remake of Parsons' earlier song "Do You Know How It Feels". When Parsons later hooked up with other musicians to form the Flying Burrito Brothers, he invited Hoh to become their drummer. He played on their early recording sessions, but by then had started to develop a substance abuse problem. According to the group's Chris Hillman, "Eddie would come to the sessions and fall off of the drum stool he would be so out of it". Only "Sin City" and the demo song with Parsons (with later overdubs) were used for the group's debut album, The Gilded Palace of Sin. Jon Corneal, who was brought in to drum on several of the album's songs, recalled "As I understand it they gave Eddie Hoh an equal share of the cash advance [from the record company] and then he split. He ended up with my money". Corneal's account was echoed by Parsons.

== Later years and death ==
Some time after a last album with Harvey Mandel (Games Guitars Play, released in 1970), Eddie Hoh apparently stopped recording and performing. In a 2002 quote about the Mamas and the Papas, Denny Doherty believed Hoh had died. A 2006 biography in Great Rock Drummers of the Sixties concluded he "reportedly has been out of the music business for some time, down on his luck". Hoh was out of the public eye for the remainder of his life.

Hoh died in a nursing home in Westmont, Illinois, on November 7, 2015, aged 71, from undisclosed causes.

== Discography ==
Since most of Hoh's recordings were as a session drummer, his credits are sometimes unclear or nonexistent. Albums with some tracks known to have been recorded without Hoh are marked with an asterisk (*). He appears on several compilation and career retrospective albums by artists with whom he worked.

- "This Could Be the Night" (The Big T.N.T. Show soundtrack) – Modern Folk Quintet (frequently listed on reissues as "Modern Folk Quartet") (11/1965)
- "Night Time Girl"/"Lifetime" (single) – Modern Folk Quintet/MFQ (3/1966)
- Sunshine Superman* – Donovan (9/1966)
- "February Sunshine"/"Big Apple" (single) – The Giant Sunflower (4/1967)
- "Pleasant Valley Sunday"/"Words" (single) – The Monkees (7/1967)
- Goodbye and Hello – Tim Buckley (8/1967)
- "What's So Good About Goodbye"/"Mark Twain" (single) – The Giant Sunflower (10/1967)
- Pisces, Aquarius, Capricorn & Jones Ltd.* – The Monkees (11/1967)
- Carnival of Life* – Lee Michaels (2/1968)
- The Birds, The Bees & The Monkees* – The Monkees (4/1968)
- Super Session – Mike Bloomfield/Al Kooper/Stephen Stills (7/1968)
- Cristo Redentor* – Harvey Mandel (1968)
- There's No Hole in My Soul – Barry Goldberg Reunion (1968)
- Stone Blues – Charlie Musselwhite (1968)
- Mighty Grahame Bond – Graham Bond (1968)
- Outrageous – Kim Fowley (1968)
- Head* – The Monkees (12/1968)
- Monterey Pop (film) – The Mamas & the Papas (12/1968, filmed 1967)
- The Gilded Palace of Sin* – The Flying Burrito Brothers (2/1969)
- Instant Replay* – The Monkees (2/1969)
- Two Jews Blues – Barry Goldberg (1969)
- Righteous* – Harvey Mandel (1969)
- Flying Bear Medicine Show* – jam with Harvey Mandel and members of Linn County, the McCoys, Buddy Miles Express, and Sir Douglas Quintet (1969)
- Tongue & Groove* – Tongue and Groove (1969)
- What That Is – Screamin' Jay Hawkins (1969)
- Farewell Aldebaran* – Judy Henske and Jerry Yester (1969)
- Barry Goldberg & Friends (w/various names) – Barry Goldberg (1969)
- Games Guitars Play — Harvey Mandel (1970)
- Historic Performances Recorded at the Monterey International Pop Festival – The Mamas & the Papas (1970, recorded 1967)
- Barry Goldberg & Friends Recorded Live (w/various names) – Barry Goldberg (various dates, recorded circa 1969)
- Works in Progress* – Tim Buckley (1999, recorded 1967–1968)
- The Complete Monterey Pop Festival (DVD set) – The Mamas & the Papas (2002, filmed 1967)
- Good Times!* – The Monkees (2016, features some basic tracks recorded as early as 1968)

== Notes ==
Footnotes

Citations

References

- Childs, Marti Smiley; March, Jeff (1999). Echoes of the Sixties. Billboard Books. ISBN 978-0-8230-8316-9.
- Cianci, Bob (2006). Great Rock Drummers of the Sixties. Hal Leonard. ISBN 978-0-634-09925-0.
- Cotten, Lee (2003). Twist & Shout - The Golden Age of American Rock 'N Roll, Vol. III: 1960–1963. High Sierra Books. ISBN 978-0-9646588-4-4.
- Dann, David (2019). Guitar King: Michael Bloomfield's Life in the Blues. University of Texas Press. ISBN 978-1477318935.
- Deck, Carol (November 6, 1965). "Modern Folk Quartet". KRLA Beat. 1 (34). BEAT Publications.
- Einarson, John (2001). Desperados: The Roots of Country Rock. Cooper Square Press. ISBN 978-0-8154-1065-2.
- Einarson, John (2005). Mr. Tambourine Man: The Life and Legacy of The Byrds' Gene Clark. Backbeat Books. ISBN 978-0-87930-793-6.
- Einarson, John (2008). Hot Burritos: The True Story of The Flying Burrito Brothers. Jawbone Press. ISBN 978-1-906002-16-9.
- Fisk, Thermon (July 9, 1966). "Gene Clark: 'You Have to Hear It and See It Yourself'". KRLA Beat. 2 (17). BEAT Publications: 3.
- Greenwald, Matthew (2002). Go Where You Wanna Go: The Oral History of The Mamas and The Papas. Cooper Square Press. ISBN 978-0-8154-1204-5.
- Hoskyns, Barney (1999). Waiting for the Sun: Strange Days, Weird Scenes, and the Sound of Los Angeles. St. Martin's Griffin. ISBN 0-312-17056-4.
- Kubernik, Harvey (2012). Canyon of Dreams: The Magic and the Music of Laurel Canyon. Sterling. ISBN 978-1-4027-9761-3.
- Meyer, David N (2008). Twenty Thousand Roads: The Ballad of Gram Parsons and His Cosmic American Music. Villard. ISBN 978-0-345-50336-7.
- Milano, Brett (1992). The Lee Michaels Collection (Compilation notes). Lee Michaels. Rhino Records. OCLC 26884918. R2 70374.
- Priore, Dominic (2007). Riot on Sunset Strip. Jawbone Press. ISBN 978-1-906002-04-6.
- Underwood, Lee (2002). Blue Melody: Tim Buckley Remembered. Backbeat Books. ISBN 0-87930-718-8.
- Wolkin, Jan Mark; Keenom, Bill (2000). Michael Bloomfield - If You Love These Blues: An Oral History. Backbeat Books. ISBN 978-0-87930-617-5.
- Zimmer, Dave (2008). Crosby, Stills & Nash: The Biography. Da Capo Press. ISBN 978-0-306-81615-4.
