= Hank Cicalo =

American recording engineer (1932–2024)

- Born: Henry Cicalo; June 25, 1932; Brooklyn, New York, U.S.
- Died: January 31, 2024 (aged 91) Los Angeles, California, U.S.
- Genres: Rock; folk; jazz; country
- Occupation: Recording engineer
- Years active: 1954–2008
- Label: RCA

Henry "Hank" Cicalo (June 25, 1932 – January 31, 2024) was an American recording engineer whose career spanned over fifty years. Among the artists recorded by Cicalo were The Monkees, Carole King, Barbra Streisand, and George Harrison.

== Early career ==
In 1957, Cicalo started in the mastering room at Capitol Studios, then progressed to second engineer and worked with many great engineers like John Krause, Hugh Davies, John Palladino, and Pete Abbott. He worked on albums for such Capitol artists as Frank Sinatra, Dean Martin, and Nat King Cole, and moved up to engineer, working with such notables as Cannonball Adderley, Peggy Lee, Ed Ames, and Lou Rawls.

In 1963, Cicalo went to RCA Records in Hollywood. As one of the lead engineers at RCA, he worked with artists including Eddy Arnold, Vic Damone, Ann-Margret, Eddie Fisher, Peter Nero, Duke Ellington, Wayne Newton, and Tommy Leonetti.

In the mid-1960s, Cicalo also worked closely with Tom Mack, producer for Dot Records. Their projects included The Mills Brothers, The Lennon Sisters, Jimmie Rodgers, Glen Campbell, Ernie Andrews, Frankie Carle, and Harry James. Their biggest project together was Lalo Schifrin's Mission Impossible, the theme for the 1966 television series of the same name, for which Cicalo was nominated for the Grammy Award for Best Engineered Recording, Non-Classical.

== The Monkees ==
While at RCA Records, Cicalo recorded The Monkees for Colgems Records. In total, he engineered four albums for the band, including The Monkees, More of The Monkees, Live 1967, and Headquarters. All three studio albums with the group went multi-platinum, each reaching number one on the Billboard charts.

The Monkees' Headquarters album was their first to feature all four band members playing instruments. Lacking experience as a recording group, the sessions dragged out from a normal two or three weeks to a full six weeks. Cicalo worked patiently with the Monkees and their producer Chip Douglas (himself a first-time producer), and the album came together as the band learned about making records. As a thank-you to Cicalo, the Monkees gave him the writing credit for their song "No Time" (included on Headquarters). This briefly got Cicalo into trouble, as RCA had a rule against engineers soliciting songs for recording. When matters were explained, Cicalo was able to collect the writer's royalties (which, he says, was used to buy a house). Released to praise and brisk sales, Headquarters was a huge success.

Cicalo also recorded the scores for the popular Monkees television show and engineered tracks on The Birds, The Bees & The Monkees, Pisces, Aquarius, Capricorn & Jones, Ltd., and Head. Cicalo toured with the band in 1967 and recalled that the most frightening experience he ever had was being attacked by a mob of teenage girls while in a limousine with The Monkees. Cicalo also engineered Mike Nesmith's first solo album, The Wichita Train Whistle Sings.

== Tapestry ==
In the 1970s, Cicalo went to work for A&M and Ode Records. He engineered Carole King's landmark Tapestry album. Tapestry was the second solo album for Carole on the Ode label, but the first album Cicalo engineered. Released in February 1971, Tapestry held the number one position on the Billboard charts for fifteen consecutive weeks, and held a record for most weeks at number one, 46 consecutive weeks in the top ten. Cicalo also worked with Carole on Rhymes & Reasons, Fantasy, Wrap Around Joy, Really Rosie, and Thoroughbred.

During the 1970s, Cicalo also continued to do freelance projects. He worked with George Harrison on Thirty-Three & 1/3 at Harrison's Friar Park recording studio. He also worked with Barbra Streisand on her ButterFly album.

== Later career and death ==
The late 1980s and 1990s saw Cicalo back in the studio, recording and mixing albums: Dreams & Themes by Patrick Williams, Body and Soul and The Groove Shop by Clayton Hamilton Jazz Orchestra, Once More…With Feeling by Doc Severinsen & The Tonight Show Band. In 1995, Cicalo recorded and produced Professional Dreamer by Kenny Rankin; it was a chance for Rankin to record many of his favorite jazz standards.

In 1992, Cicalo recorded the popular children's album, Pure Imagination, by Michael Feinstein. It was the beginning of a collaboration that resulted in several subsequent recordings. He engineered Isn’t It Romantic, That’s Entertainment, Hugh Martin Songbook, as well as Such Sweet Sorrow, and Nice Work If You Can Get It – which he also co-produced.

Though he had worked with Lou Rawls on earlier projects, Cicalo was particularly proud of Rawls Sings Sinatra, recorded with in 2003. It was one of the last of Rawls' projects, and Cicalo enjoyed working with Rawls again, as well as with producer Billy Vera.

Cicalo's last album was the two-CD 2008 release: Tapestry – Legacy Edition.

Cicalo died at his home on January 31, 2024, at the age of 91.
