= Pleasant Valley Sunday =

1967 single by the Monkees

- US picture sleeve

Single by the Monkees

from the album Pisces, Aquarius, Capricorn & Jones Ltd.
- B-side: "Words"
- Released: July 1967
- Recorded: 10, 11 & 13 June 1967
- Studio: RCA Victor (Hollywood)
- Genre: Pop rock; psychedelic rock
- Length: 3:10
- Label: Colgems No. 1007
- Songwriters: Gerry Goffin; Carole King
- Producer: Chip Douglas

The Monkees singles chronology
"A Little Bit Me, a Little Bit You" (1967)	"Pleasant Valley Sunday" (1967)	"Daydream Believer" (1967)

"Pleasant Valley Sunday" is a song by Gerry Goffin and Carole King, recorded and released by the Monkees in the summer of 1967. Inspired by their move to West Orange, New Jersey, and named after a street there, Goffin and King wrote the song about Goffin's dissatisfaction with life in the suburbs.

The Monkees' version differs somewhat from Goffin and King's demo, and their recording features a distinctive guitar intro played by Michael Nesmith and a heavily reverberated fade-out. It became one of the Monkees' most successful singles, peaking at No. 3 and continuing a string of top ten hits. The song was included on Pisces, Aquarius, Capricorn & Jones Ltd., the group's fourth album, in November 1967.

== Writing ==
Carole King stated in her autobiography that after she and her husband and songwriting partner Gerry Goffin had earned enough money from songwriting royalties, they moved from New York City to West Orange, New Jersey, where one of the major thoroughfares in town is called Pleasant Valley Way. Goffin disliked their suburban life and wrote lyrics to document the feeling that became "Pleasant Valley Sunday." The lyrics are a social commentary on status symbols, the boredom and conformity of life in suburbia, and "keeping up with the Joneses". Michael Nesmith joked in a 1978 interview with Blitz magazine that the song was written about "a mental institution."

In the book SuburbiaNation, Robert Beuka described the lyrics as "a wry commentary on the materialistic and anesthetized sensibilities of the adult generation in suburbia." Brian Ward wrote in The 1960s: A Documentary Reader that the song was associated with the New Left and the counterculture. Deanna D. Sellnow commented in The Rhetorical Power of Popular Culture that its rhetorical message is "bleak."

== Recording ==
King recorded a demo of "Pleasant Valley Sunday", later included on the 2012 compilation album The Legendary Demos, at a slower tempo and with a different bridge ("Creature comfort goals/Can only numb my soul/I need a change of scenery/My thoughts all seem to stray/To places far away/I don’t ever want to see/Another Pleasant Valley Sunday" was changed to "Creature comfort goals/They only numb my soul/And make it hard for me to see/My thoughts all seem to stray/To places far away/I need a change of scenery"). The Monkees' producer Chip Douglas, who was responsible for these changes, stated that King disapproved of them.

"Pleasant Valley Sunday" was recorded during the Pisces, Aquarius, Capricorn & Jones Ltd. sessions. The previous album, Headquarters, had the band themselves playing many of the instruments, while Pisces relied more on session musicians. The basic track for "Pleasant Valley Sunday" was recorded on June 10, 1967, with Michael Nesmith on electric guitar, Peter Tork on piano, Douglas on bass guitar, and Eddie Hoh on drums. Micky Dolenz was present at the session and may have played acoustic guitar. The next day, Nesmith overdubbed another electric guitar part, while Hoh recorded shaker and conga overdubs and Bill Chadwick performed a second acoustic guitar part. The Monkees then recorded their vocals, with the possible participation of Douglas, on June 13. Nesmith played another guitar part, while Hoh overdubbed more percussion. Dolenz sang lead, with Nesmith harmonizing.

The distinctive electric guitar riff was played by Nesmith on a black Gibson Les Paul guitar through three Vox Super Beatle amplifiers. Douglas wrote the riff based on that of the Beatles' "I Want to Tell You."

For the song's ending, Douglas and engineer Hank Cicalo "[kept] pushing everything up," increasingly adding reverberation and echo until the sound became unrecognizable.

== Release and reception ==
Billboard described the single as a "strong, easy rocker" that is "excitingly performed." Cash Box called it "an up-tempo happy-flavored ditty celebrating summertime activities that are regarded as All-American and quaint." Tork praised the vocal performances of Dolenz and Nesmith. The single peaked at No. 3 on the Hot 100 and was repeatedly featured in the second season of their television series. The song also appeared on the fourth Monkees album, Pisces, Aquarius, Capricorn & Jones Ltd., in November 1967. While domestic mono copies of the album included the same version heard on the single, stereo copies featured a version with a different take of the first verse, an additional backing vocal (Jones) during the break, and a longer resolve at the end. A different stereo mix, more closely resembling the single version, appeared on the 1991 Monkees box set Listen to the Band. On the Pisces album, the song is introduced by Tork's brief spoken-word interlude "Peter Percival Patterson's Pet Pig Porky."

The B-side of the "Pleasant Valley Sunday" single, "Words," was written by regular Monkees collaborators Boyce and Hart.

In February 1986, MTV broadcast a marathon of episodes of The Monkees titled Pleasant Valley Sunday, which sparked a new wave of interest in the band. Dolenz, Tork, and Jones, already on tour at the time, quickly transitioned from playing in small venues to performing in stadiums in the weeks that followed.

== Personnel ==
Credits from Andrew Sandoval.

- Micky Dolenz – lead vocals, possible acoustic guitar
- Michael Nesmith – harmony vocals, electric guitar
- Peter Tork – piano, backing vocals
- Davy Jones – backing vocals

=== Session musicians and production staff ===
- Bill Chadwick – acoustic guitar
- Chip Douglas – bass guitar, producer, possible backing vocals
- "Fast" Eddie Hoh – drums, percussion
- Hank Cicalo – engineer

== Chart performance ==
=== Weekly charts ===
Chart (1967)	Peak position
Australia Kent Music Report	10
Canada RPM	1
Germany	18
Ireland	11
New Zealand	2
Norway	4
UK Singles Chart	11
US Billboard Hot 100	3
US Cash Box Top 100	3

=== Year-end charts ===
Chart (1967)	Rank
Canada	24
US Billboard Hot 100	74
US Cash Box	62

== In popular culture ==
- Grand Funk Railroad's 1970 song "I'm Your Captain (Closer to Home)" opens with a guitar intro played by Mark Farner that borrows directly from "Pleasant Valley Sunday".
- The pop punk band The Mr. T Experience covered the song on their 1986 debut album Everybody's Entitled to Their Own Opinion.
- The Wedding Present covered the song on their 1992 album Hit Parade 1.
- The Christian band Code of Ethics covered the song on their 1995 album Arms Around the World.
- Mark Mothersbaugh covered the song for the theme song of the 2002 TV series Hidden Hills.
- In the 2005 Gilmore Girls season 5 episode "To Live and Let Diorama", the song is heard playing at the music store owned by Sophie Bloom (a character played by Carole King, who co-wrote the song).
- Neal Morse, lead singer of Transatlantic and former lead singer of Spock's Beard, covered the song on his 2006 album Cover to Cover.
- In the 2008 Family Guy season 6 episode "McStroke", this song plays in the background during a chase scene.
- Jazz singer Kurt Elling covered the song on his 2012 album 1619 Broadway – The Brill Building Project.
- The song is performed in Act II of the 2013 jukebox musical Beautiful: The Carole King Musical.
- Candle Acid covered the song on their 2020 album Home Behind the Clouds.
