= That Was Then, This Is Now (song) =

Single by The Monkees

from the album Then & Now... The Best of The Monkees
- B-side: "(Theme from) The Monkees"; (1966 album version)
- Released: June 27, 1986
- Recorded: May 30, 1986
- Genre: New wave, synth-pop
- Length: 4:02
- Label: Arista
- Songwriter: Vance Brescia
- Producer: Michael Lloyd

The Monkees singles chronology
"Christmas Is My Time of Year" (1976)	"That Was Then, This Is Now" (1986)	"Daydream Believer (remix)" (1986)

Alternative cover
- UK picture sleeve

"That Was Then, This Is Now" is a song written by Vance Brescia for his band the Mosquitos and recorded as the title track of their 1985 EP. Clive Davis of Arista Records heard it and picked it to be the Monkees' comeback single and theme of their 20th Anniversary Tour in 1986.

== Background ==
The Monkees (Micky Dolenz and Peter Tork) covered the song for Arista Records, who released their recording as a single and on the compilation album Then & Now... The Best of The Monkees in June 1986. The compilation album with three newly recorded songs was released by Arista and went platinum during the tour. “That Was Then, This Is Now” became the band's new single and a video for it was filmed at the Arena at Great Adventure in Jackson, New Jersey on July 25. The video received heavy airplay on MTV, making the song a Billboard Top 20 hit the summer of 1986.

== Reception ==
The song was a surprise hit, capitalizing on Monkees nostalgia at the time, reaching No. 20 on the Billboard Hot 100 (the band's first Top 40 hit since "D.W. Washburn" in 1968), and No. 24 on the adult contemporary chart. It has since been featured on several compilation albums by the band. Despite the highly publicized reunion of three original members of the Monkees and their successful 20th Anniversary Tour in that year, it was the band's last US Top 20 hit.
