= Daydream Believer =

1967 single by the Monkees

- US picture sleeve

Single by the Monkees

from the album The Birds, The Bees & The Monkees
- B-side: "Goin' Down"
- Released: October 25, 1967
- Recorded: June 14, 1967; August 9, 1967
- Studio: RCA Victor (Hollywood, California)
- Genre: Psychedelic pop; baroque pop; sunshine pop
- Length: 3:00
- Label: Colgems #1012
- Songwriter: John Stewart
- Producer: Chip Douglas

The Monkees singles chronology
| "Pleasant Valley Sunday" (1967) | "Daydream Believer" (1967) | "Valleri" (1968) |
| "That Was Then, This Is Now" (1986) | "Daydream Believer (remix)" (1986) | "Heart and Soul" (1987) |

Music video
- "Daydream Believer" on YouTube

"Daydream Believer" is a song composed by American songwriter John Stewart shortly before he left the Kingston Trio. It was recorded by the Monkees, with Davy Jones singing the lead. The single reached No. 1 on the US Billboard Hot 100 chart in December 1967, remaining there for four weeks, and peaked at No. 5 on the UK Singles Chart. It was the Monkees' third and last No. 1 hit in the U.S.

In 1979, "Daydream Believer" was recorded by Canadian singer Anne Murray, whose version reached No. 3 on the US country singles chart and No. 12 on the Billboard Hot 100. The song has been recorded by others, including a 1971 version by Stewart.

The song title was featured in the name of the 2000 biopic about the band, Daydream Believers: The Monkees' Story.

== Background ==
John Stewart wrote "Daydream Believer" as the third in a trilogy of songs about suburban life. He recalled: "I remember going to bed thinking, 'What a wasted day – all I've done is daydream.' And from there I wrote the whole song. I never thought it was one of my best songs. Not at all".

The song was turned down by We Five and Spanky and Our Gang. While attending a party at Hoyt Axton's home in Hollywood's Laurel Canyon, producer Chip Douglas told Stewart that he was now producing the Monkees and asked if Stewart had any songs that might work for the group. Stewart offered "Daydream Believer". The song was recorded during the sessions for the Monkees' 1967 album Pisces, Aquarius, Capricorn & Jones Ltd., but was ultimately included on their 1968 album The Birds, The Bees & the Monkees. All four Monkees appear on the track; in addition to the lead vocals by Jones, Michael Nesmith plays lead guitar, Peter Tork plays piano and Micky Dolenz sings backing vocals. Tork created the piano introduction, and the orchestral arrangement was created by jazz trumpeter and composer Shorty Rogers.

Jones said he had been "pissed off" recording the song, with his lead vocal showing a hint of annoyance at the ongoing takes.

According to Fred Bronson's mid-1980s book The Billboard Book of Number One Hits, the recording was scheduled to be the B-side of the Barry Mann/Cynthia Weil song "Love Is Only Sleeping" (from Pisces, Aquarius, Capricorn & Jones Ltd.), featuring lead vocals by Michael Nesmith. However, a week before release, it was discovered that the European single masters for "Love Is Only Sleeping" were not ready, but the masters for "Daydream Believer" were. A last-minute switch meant that "Daydream Believer" now became the A-side and "Goin' Down", a song written by all four Monkees with Diane Hildebrand in the style of Mose Allison, became the flip side. Nesmith would not be given a lead vocal on a Monkees single A-side until 1969's "Listen to the Band". Allegedly, Colgems Records did not like Nesmith's voice, preferring the voices of both Dolenz and Jones, and was further aggrieved when Nesmith insisted on the inclusion of at least two of his songs per album. Previously, Nesmith's lead vocal version of "The Girl I Knew Somewhere" had been replaced with Dolenz on lead vocals for the B-side of the single "A Little Bit Me, a Little Bit You".

Billboard described the single as a "well written easy beat rhythm ballad" with a "clever opening". Cash Box said that it has "fascinating arrangements that develop from a simple piano opening to a compelling ... ensemble and the hypnotic repetition of a very catchy refrain." Record World said "it has a magnetic melody and lyrics". According to Variety, the song's lyrics focus on the endgame of a comfy but increasingly distant relationship, with the narrator "caught in mid-gaze before the bathroom mirror, reflecting on the quiet dissolution of his materialistic marriage – a union between 'a daydream believer and a homecoming queen,' now curdled, driven more by money than by romance."

RCA Records did not like the song as written by Stewart, and insisted on changing a critical word. Stewart wrote: "Now you know how funky I can be" but RCA wanted to change it to "Now you know how happy I can be", for one meaning of "funky" is "smelly". Stewart initially objected because the change would completely reverse the meaning of the line and would not make sense in the context of the song. He relented because RCA was adamant and he realized that the song could be a hit. In 2006, Stewart said that the proceeds from "Daydream Believer" "... kept me alive for all these years".

In 1986, three of the four Monkees (Dolenz, Jones and Tork) mounted a successful reunion tour and had a major hit with the newly recorded "That Was Then, This Is Now". Arista Records, which owned the Monkees' masters at the time, re-released "Daydream Believer" as a follow-up single, remixed with a new and heavier percussion track by Michael Lloyd, who had produced "That Was Then, This Is Now".

== Personnel ==
Credits adapted from Rhino Handmade 2010 "Deluxe Edition" box set.

The Monkees

- Davy Jones – lead vocals, spoken word
- Micky Dolenz – harmony vocals
- Michael Nesmith – electric guitar
- Peter Tork – piano

Additional personnel

- Chip Douglas – bass, percussion, piano, spoken word, producer
- Bill Martin – bell
- Eddie Hoh – drums
- Nathan Kaproff, George Kast, Alex Murray, Erno Neufeld – violin
- Pete Candoli, Al Porcino, Manuel Stevens – trumpet
- Manuel Stevens – piccolo trumpet
- Richard Noel – trombone
- Richard Leith, Philip Teele – bass trombone
- Shorty Rogers – string arrangement

== Charts ==
=== Weekly charts ===
| Chart (1967–1968) | Peak position |
|---|---|
| Australia (Go-Set) | 2 |
| Austrian Singles Chart | 7 |
| Belgian Singles Chart (Flanders) | 8 |
| Canada Top Singles (RPM) | 1 |
| Finland (Suomen Virallinen) | 15 |
| Irish Singles Chart | 1 |
| Japanese Oricon Singles Chart | 4 |
| New Zealand (Listener) | 1 |
| Norway (VG-lista) | 2 |
| South Africa (Springbok) | 1 |
| Swiss Singles Chart | 10 |
| UK Singles Chart | 5 |
| US Billboard Hot 100 | 1 |
| US Cash Box Top 100 | 1 |
| West German Singles Chart | 4 |

| Chart (1986) | Peak position |
|---|---|
| US Billboard Hot 100 | 79 |

=== Year-end charts ===
| Chart (1967) | Rank |
|---|---|
| Canada (RPM) | 7 |
| US Billboard Hot 100 | 94 |

| Chart (1968) | Rank |
|---|---|
| Australia | 28 |
| South Africa | 17 |

=== All-time charts ===
| Chart (1958-2018) | Position |
|---|---|
| US Billboard Hot 100 | 312 |

== Certifications and sales ==
| Region | Certification | Certified units/sales |
|---|---|---|
| Japan (RIAJ) | Gold | 100,000^{*} |
| New Zealand (RMNZ) | Platinum | 30,000^{‡} |
| United Kingdom (BPI) | Platinum | 600,000^{‡} |
| United States (RIAA) | Gold | 1,000,000^{^} |
^{*} Sales figures based on certification alone.^{^} Shipments figures based on certification alone.^{‡} Sales+streaming figures based on certification alone.

== John Stewart version ==
"Daydream Believer"

Song by John Stewart

from the album The Lonesome Picker Rides Again
- Released: November 1971
- Genre: Folk
- Length: 3:28
- Label: Warner Bros.
- Songwriter: John Stewart
- Producer: Michael Stewart

In 1971, songwriter John Stewart recorded his own version and included it as the ninth track on his fourth studio album, The Lonesome Picker Rides Again. His version was released on Warner Bros. Records and was produced by his brother Michael Stewart.

== Anne Murray version ==
"Daydream Believer"

Single by Anne Murray

from the album I'll Always Love You
- B-side: "Do You Think Of Me?"
- Released: December 1979
- Recorded: 1979
- Studio: Eastern Sound (Toronto, Ontario, Canada)
- Genre: Country
- Length: 2:26
- Label: Capitol
- Songwriter: John Stewart
- Producer: Jim Ed Norman

Anne Murray singles chronology
| "Broken Hearted Me" (1979) | "Daydream Believer" (1979) | "Lucky Me" (1980) |

=== Background ===
Canadian singer Anne Murray recorded a cover version of "Daydream Believer" for her platinum-certified 1979 studio album I'll Always Love You. Produced by Jim Ed Norman and issued on Capitol Records the following year, Murray's single became her eighth No. 1 hit on the U.S. Adult Contemporary chart. It reached No. 12 on the Billboard Hot 100 chart and No. 3 on Billboard's country chart. For her 2007 album Anne Murray Duets: Friends and Legends, Murray rerecorded the song as a duet with Nelly Furtado.

=== Charts ===
==== Weekly charts ====
| Chart (1979–1980) | Peak position |
|---|---|
| Canada Top Singles (RPM) | 17 |
| Canada Adult Contemporary (RPM) | 1 |
| Canada Country Tracks (RPM) | 1 |
| US Billboard Hot 100 | 12 |
| US Adult Contemporary (Billboard) | 1 |
| US Hot Country Songs (Billboard) | 3 |
| US Cash Box Top 100 | 21 |

| Year-end chart (1980) | Rank |
|---|---|
| US Top Pop Singles (Billboard) | 61 |

== Sakura Gakuin version ==
=== Background ===
Japanese idol training group Sakura Gakuin recorded a cover version of this song with lyrics translated to Japanese. The song was released as a B-side for the single "Jump Up ~Chiisana Yuuki~" in 2014. Members Marina Horiuchi, Raura Iida, Nene Sugisaki, and Hinata Sato participated in the recording of the song.

=== Charts ===
| Chart | Rank |
|---|---|
| Oricon Singles | 25 |

== See also ==
- List of Hot 100 number-one singles of 1967 (U.S.)
- List of number-one singles of 1968 (Ireland)
- List of number-one adult contemporary singles of 1980 (U.S.)
