= The Girl I Knew Somewhere =

Single by the Monkees
- A-side: "A Little Bit Me, a Little Bit You"
- Released: March 8, 1967
- Recorded: February 23, 1967
- Studio: RCA Victor, Hollywood, California
- Genre: Folk-pop
- Length: 2:32
- Label: Colgems
- Songwriter: Michael Nesmith
- Producer: Chip Douglas

The Monkees singles chronology
"I'm a Believer" (1966)	"The Girl I Knew Somewhere" (1967)	"Pleasant Valley Sunday" (1967)

"The Girl I Knew Somewhere" is a song by the American pop rock band the Monkees, written by Michael Nesmith and first released as the B-side to the "A Little Bit Me, a Little Bit You" single on Colgems Records on March 8, 1967. It was distributed in support of the group's third album Headquarters, and later appeared on the reissued version of the LP. The song was recorded as the Monkees finally achieved the independence that enabled them to freely produce their own material, with the actual band members featured on both vocals and instrumental arrangements.

"The Girl I Knew Somewhere" peaked at #39 on the Billboard Hot 100, while its A-side "A Little Bit Me, a Little Bit You" reached No. 2.

== Background ==
The Monkees had enjoyed enormous commercial success with their first two albums, The Monkees and More of the Monkees, both reaching No. 1 on the Billboard 200. However, under the direction of music supervisor Don Kirshner, the group was almost completely barred from studio work, aside from recording as vocalists and writing some original material. Longing to achieve creative freedom, the Monkees, led by Michael Nesmith, who felt especially insulted by Kirshner's condescension, entered months of bitter negotiations that eventually concluded with Kirshner being fired. With his departure, the band was finally given the ability to direct production and play instruments themselves, making the Headquarters sessions the first to feature the Monkees on the arrangements. On the band members' differing styles, Nesmith said: "[It was like] a really good tennis player, and a really good football player, and a really good basketball player, and a really good golfer got together and played baseball. ... We could give it a try. Maybe make a little garage-band music."

Although it was unknown to the record-buying public upon its release, "The Girl I Knew Somewhere" was the first song recorded by the Monkees containing instruments performed by the band members. It was first recorded on January 19, 1967, with Nesmith on lead vocals; however, a second version was recorded on February 23, 1967, with Micky Dolenz replacing Nesmith to create a more commercialized sound (the key was also changed from A to C). The song became very accessible with its breezy melodic shifts, catchy rhythm and relatable lyrics.

Since its original distribution, the composition has been featured on nearly all of the Monkees' compilation albums, first appearing on 40 Timeless Hits in 1980. An early demo of "The Girl I Knew Somewhere" is included on The Headquarters Sessions, along with a rendition with additional backing vocals, and a stereo version was first released on More Greatest Hits of the Monkees.

== Reception ==
Billboard predicted that the single was "destined to become [the Monkees] third million seller in a row," stating that "The Girl I Knew Somewhere" had equal potential as did "A Little Bit Me, A Little Bit You."

== Personnel ==
- Micky Dolenz – lead vocals, drums
- Michael Nesmith – electric guitar, 12-string guitar, backing vocals
- Peter Tork – acoustic guitar, harpsichord
- John London – bass guitar, tambourine
