= Headquarters (The Monkees album) =

Studio album by the Monkees
- Released: May 22, 1967
- Recorded: February 23 – April 18, 1967
- Studios: RCA Victor (Hollywood, California)
- Genre: Pop rock
- Length: 30:52
- Label: Colgems
- Producer: Chip Douglas

The Monkees chronology
More of the Monkees (1967)	Headquarters (1967)	Pisces, Aquarius, Capricorn & Jones Ltd. (1967)

Singles from Headquarters
- 1. "Randy Scouse Git" Released: May 22, 1967

Professional ratings
Review scores
Source	Rating
AllMusic	4.5/5 stars
MusicHound Rock	2.5/5 stars
Record Collector	4/5 stars
The Rolling Stone Album Guide	1.5/5 stars

Headquarters is the third studio album by the American pop rock band the Monkees, released on May 22, 1967, by Colgems Records. It was the first Monkees album on which the four band members played instruments and wrote much of the material themselves, following a struggle for creative control over their music with supervisor Don Kirshner. After winning the right to produce their own recordings, the group recorded Headquarters with producer Chip Douglas, and largely dispensed with session musicians. The album was a commercial success: it became the Monkees' third consecutive Billboard 200 number-one album in the United States, selling over two million copies within the first two months of release (earning a double platinum certification). It also reached No. 2 on the UK Albums Chart. Headquarters has since been included in the book 1001 Albums You Must Hear Before You Die.

== Background ==
While the original concept of their third album was to follow the same format and production of the first two albums, after the release of More of the Monkees (1967), the group, particularly Michael Nesmith and Peter Tork, was becoming increasingly frustrated by the limited creative input they were allowed by Don Kirshner, and continued to fight for more creative control and independence from him. Kirshner had already begun supervising recording sessions with studio musicians for their third album, with Davy Jones recording vocal tracks for some of the songs, while the group took it upon themselves, independent of Kirshner, to record two songs featuring them both singing and playing ("All of Your Toys" and "The Girl I Knew Somewhere"), as a means of proving to him that they were capable of providing their own musical accompaniment on future albums. Kirshner was adamant that their music should continue to be recorded under the previous albums' recording style, and was desperate to have the group provide further vocal tracks to the pre-recorded songs before their upcoming planned vacations in order to continue their previous chart-topping successes by having the new single displace the current number one song, "I'm a Believer", thereby having the group hold number one and number two positions.

As upcoming talks with Kirshner about their concerns continued to be delayed, the group, citing exhaustion from their grueling TV, touring and recording schedule, were unwilling to postpone the vacations and took advantage of the situation by threatening to quit the show, and subsequently the band, unless their demands were met. Micky Dolenz offered a last-minute compromise: the group would agree to sing on Kirshner's tracks in exchange for his allowing one of their previously recorded group performance tracks to serve as the B-side. While it seemed that Kirshner would agree, tensions soon came to a head when he released the third single (in Canada), with the Jones' tracks on both sides ("A Little Bit Me, a Little Bit You" and an early version of "She Hangs Out"), without the approval of record executives, the show's producers or the group, completely ignoring their request. This led to Kirshner's dismissal from the Monkees project, with the group finally being given full creative control of their next album. The single was withdrawn from Canada and pulled from scheduled release in the US. Since "A Little Bit Me, A Little Bit You" was already announced as the next single, it was retained as the A-side and "The Girl I Knew Somewhere" as the B-side (a publishing error prevented "All of Your Toys" from being used), replacing "She Hangs Out". The remaining Kirshner-supervised tracks that had already been finished were discarded, while the group was finally given the creative freedom and input they requested and soon began recording their third album, free of the restrictions previously imposed by Kirshner.

== Releases ==
The album was released on May 22, 1967, and charted at No. 1 in the U.S., only to be replaced the following week by the Beatles' Sgt. Pepper's Lonely Hearts Club Band; it then began a run of 11 consecutive weeks at the No. 2 position as Sgt. Pepper's Lonely Hearts Club Band and Headquarters became the two top-selling records during the "Summer of Love" period.

The album was issued on the compact disc format for the first time by Arista Records in 1989, remixed from the multi-tracks, then later from the original stereo master tape in 1995, with several bonus tracks on Rhino Entertainment. In 2000, Rhino, through its Rhino Handmade division, issued The Headquarters Sessions, a three-disc box set of outtakes from the session as well as the album's original monophonic mix presented in an alternate running order that had been rejected before the album's official release.

In 2007, Rhino issued a two-disc deluxe edition of the album. The CD set was housed in a digipak with a slipcase and featured original album artwork (including replicas of the original Colgems vinyl labels on each disc), as well as a booklet of essays and session information by Monkees historian Andrew Sandoval. The discs contained both the stereo and mono mixes of the album, remastered, as well as alternate mixes and outtakes.

In 2022, Rhino released a four-disc "Super Deluxe Edition" which included the original album in remixed form, as well as tracks from the aborted January 1967 Kirshner sessions, alternate mixes and previously unreleased outtakes.

== Album cover ==
The original rear album cover features a collage of photos including one of producer Chip Douglas and engineer Dick Bogert. However, the photo was mislabeled: it identifies engineer Hank Cicalo as sitting next to Chip Douglas. This is known as the "producers cover". Colgems/RCA corrected the error by substituting a different photo rather than revising the caption. Peter, Micky and Mike were sporting light beards while Davy's shoulder-length hair had been cut off; this has come to be known as the "beard cover". This is the corrected version because it was standard practice for RCA to add an "RE" to the catalog number when any one side of a record sleeve had a revision. The "beard cover" has a catalog number of COS/COM-103 RE.

== Track listing ==
Side one
No.	Title	Writer(s)	Lead vocals	Length
1.	"You Told Me"	Michael Nesmith	Nesmith	2:25
2.	"I'll Spend My Life with You"	Tommy Boyce; Bobby Hart	Micky Dolenz	2:26
3.	"Forget That Girl"	Douglas Farthing Hatlelid	Davy Jones	2:25
4.	"Band 6"	Dolenz; Jones; Nesmith; Peter Tork	instrumental	0:41
5.	"You Just May Be the One"	Nesmith	Nesmith	2:03
6.	"Shades of Gray"	Barry Mann; Cynthia Weil	Jones; Tork	3:22
7.	"I Can't Get Her Off My Mind"	Boyce; Hart	Jones	2:27

Side two
No.	Title	Writer(s)	Lead vocals	Length
1.	"For Pete's Sake"	Joey Richards; Tork	Dolenz	2:11
2.	"Mr. Webster"	Boyce; Hart	Dolenz; Jones	2:05
3.	"Sunny Girlfriend"	Nesmith	Nesmith	2:33
4.	"Zilch"	Dolenz; Jones; Nesmith; Tork	Tork; Jones; Dolenz; Nesmith	1:06
5.	"No Time"	Hank Cicalo	Dolenz	2:08
6.	"Early Morning Blues and Greens"	Diane Hildebrand; Jack Keller	Jones	2:35
7.	"Randy Scouse Git"	Dolenz	Dolenz	2:40
Total length:				30:52

- "Band 6" is an uncredited rendition of "Merrily We Roll Along" by Charlie Tobias, Murray Mencher and Eddie Cantor.
- While "No Time" was developed as a jam between the band members, the writing credit was given solely to engineer Hank Cicalo, as an "expression of gratitude".

=== Aborted track listing ===
The album's preliminary track lineup was compiled shortly after the sessions had ended and would have included the following songs:

Side one

1. "For Pete's Sake"
2. "I'll Spend My Life With You"
3. "Forget That Girl"
4. "You Just May Be the One"
5. "Shades of Gray"
6. "A Little Bit Me, A Little Bit You"
7. "Band 6"

Side two

1. "Sunny Girlfriend"
2. "Mr. Webster"
3. "You Told Me"
4. "The Girl I Knew Somewhere" [second version]
5. "Zilch"
6. "Early Morning Blues and Greens"
7. "Randy Scouse Git"

== Personnel ==
Credits adapted from 2022 Rhino "Super Deluxe Edition" box set.

The Monkees

- Michael Nesmith – lead vocals (1, 5, 10), electric 12-string guitar (1, 3, 5, 7–8, 10, 12–14), pedal steel guitar (2, 4, 6, 9), acoustic guitar (3, 5, 10), organ (8), spoken word (11)
- Peter Tork – banjo (1), backing vocals (1, 3, 5–6, 8, 14), harmony vocals (2, 13), acoustic 12-string guitar (2), organ (2, 13–14), celeste (2), electric piano (3, 13), electric guitar (4, 8, 10), bass guitar (5), lead vocals (6), piano (6, 9, 12, 14), tack pianos (7), spoken word (11)
- Micky Dolenz – zither (1), drums (1, 3–8, 10, 12–14), backing vocals (1, 3, 5, 8), lead vocals (2, 8–9, 12, 14), electric 6-string guitar (2), harmony vocals (5–7, 10), guitar (9), spoken word (11), timpani (14), woodblock (14)
- Davy Jones – percussion (1, 7), backing vocals (1–2, 5, 8, 10, 12, 14), tambourine (2, 5–6, 8–9, 12), lead vocals (3, 6–7, 9, 13), maracas (3, 6, 10, 13), spoken word (11)

Additional musicians

- Chip Douglas – bass guitar (1–4, 8, 12–14), backing vocals (3, 5)
- Jerry Yester – bass guitar (6–7)
- Vincent DeRosa – French horn (6)
- Frederick Seykora – cello (6)
- John London – bass guitar (9–10)

Unconfirmed personnel and duties

- Additional electric guitar, backing vocals (12)

Technical

- Chip Douglas (as Douglas Farthing Hatlelid) – producer
- Hank Cicalo – engineer

== Charts ==
=== Album ===
Chart (1967)	Peak position
Argentinian Albums (CAPIF)	5
Canadian Albums (RPM)	1
Finnish Albums (Suomen virallinen lista)	3
German Albums (Offizielle Top 100)	29
Norwegian Albums (VG-lista)	2
UK Albums (OCC)	2
US Billboard 200	1

=== Single ===
Year	Single	Chart	Peak position
1967	"The Girl I Knew Somewhere"	Billboard Hot 100	39

== Certifications ==
Region	Certification	Certified units/sales
United States (RIAA)	2× Platinum	2,000,000^{^}
^{^} Shipments figures based on certification alone.
