= A Little Bit Me, a Little Bit You =

- US single label

Single by the Monkees
- B-side: "The Girl I Knew Somewhere"
- Released: March 8, 1967
- Recorded: January 21 and 24; February 4 and 6, 1967
- Studio: RCA Victor Studios, Studio B New York City
- Genre: Pop rock
- Length: 2:51
- Label: Colgems #1004
- Songwriter: Neil Diamond
- Producer: Jeff Barry

The Monkees singles chronology
"I'm a Believer" (1966)	"A Little Bit Me, a Little Bit You" (1967)	"Pleasant Valley Sunday" (1967)

Alternative cover
- Japanese picture sleeve

Official audio
- "A Little Bit Me, a Little Bit You" on YouTube

"A Little Bit Me, a Little Bit You" is a song written by Neil Diamond, recorded by the Monkees, and released as a single on March 8, 1967. The lead vocal was Davy Jones' first on a Monkees single.

== Background and recording ==
The Monkees had sold millions of copies of their first two singles, "Last Train To Clarksville" and "I'm A Believer", along with their first two albums but, apart from tracks produced by Michael Nesmith, were not allowed any say into the playing or production of the music on those records, which had been handled by Don Kirshner. The pent-up frustration of the group came to a head when they discovered their second album More of the Monkees in a record store while on tour, having been given no prior knowledge about its release. The group, led by Mike Nesmith, demanded greater control over their own music and in a meeting with executives over the issue, Nesmith was so upset by Kirshner's obstinance that he punched a hole in the wall and remarked "that could have been your face."

In order to appease the band, Colgems promised that they would allow them to record two of their own songs in order to demonstrate what they could do. On January 16, 1967 the band went in for the first time to play on their own records, taping Nesmith's "The Girl I Knew Somewhere" and Bill Martin's "All of Your Toys" under the production of Turtle Chip Douglas, who had been handpicked by Nesmith. A few days later, Kirshner held a series of sessions in New York with producer Jeff Barry using studio musicians, with Davy Jones the only Monkee present, where a number of songs including "A Little Bit Me, a Little Bit You" and "She Hangs Out" were taped. "A Little Bit Me, a Little Bit You" had been promised by Kirshner to Neil Diamond as the next Monkees single, as a result of the enormous success of his "I'm a Believer." An agreement was eventually reached with Colgems whereby "A Little Bit Me, a Little Bit You" would see release as their third single, with the Monkees-performed "The Girl I Knew Somewhere" as the B-side; this 50-50 split between Kirshner's material and the group's material was supposed to be ongoing from that point forward.

Instead, without telling anyone, Kirshner attempted to release "A Little Bit Me, a Little Bit You" with another of his recent productions, "She Hangs Out", as a single in Canada during the final week of February 1967. The group were outraged that the deal had been broken and as a result, Colgems fired Kirshner from the Monkees project; this freed the band members to record their next album, Headquarters, by themselves.

== Release ==
The Canadian single was recalled after a few weeks and a replacement, the originally agreed "A Little Bit Me, a Little Bit You" b/w "The Girl I Knew Somewhere", was released in America on March 8. The single reached No. 1 on the Cashbox and Record World Top 100 charts; on the Billboard Hot 100 it reached No. 2, with "Somethin' Stupid" by Frank Sinatra and Nancy Sinatra keeping it from the top spot. "The Girl I Knew Somewhere" also charted on the Hot 100, peaking at No. 39. Subsequent issues of the song on greatest hits compilations feature a longer stereo mix without the prominent handclaps. Only decades later were the masters located (thought lost) and a proper stereo mix of the single version made. Diamond never recorded the song, as he had done with "I'm a Believer," but he did perform it during his live shows of 1967. A recording exists of one such performance at New York's Bitter End club.

== Personnel ==
Source: Headquarters: Super-Deluxe Edition 4CD set liner notes, p.16

=== Musicians ===
- Guitar: Al Gorgoni
- Organ: Arthur Butler
- Lead vocals: Davy Jones
- Guitar: Don Thomas
- Drums: Herb Lovelle
- Guitar: Hugh McCracken
- Bass guitar: Lou Mauro
- Backing vocals: Neil Diamond
- Clavinet: Stan Free
- Tambourine: Thomas Cerone
- Additional backing vocals and handclaps: Unknown

=== Technical ===
- Producer: Jeff Barry
- Engineer: Dick Bogart
- Engineer: Hank Cicalo
- Engineer: Ray Hall
- Engineer: Richi Schmitt

== Reception ==
In March 1967, Billboard predicted that the single was "destined to become [the Monkees'] third million seller in a row." Cash Box said that it was "slightly similar in sound to 'I’m A Believer.'"

== Other sources ==
- The Monkees Tale, by Eric Lefcowitz (Last Gasp Press, San Francisco, California, 1985), ISBN 978-0-86719-338-1
- The Monkees Greatest Hits, liner notes (Rhino Records)
