= Chip Douglas =

American songwriter, musician, and record producer (born 1942)

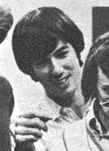
- Douglas with the MFQ and Phil Spector at Gold Star Studios in 1965

Background information
- Born: Douglas Farthing Hatlelid; August 27, 1942 (age 84); San Francisco, California, U.S.
- Occupations: Musician; songwriter; record producer
- Instruments: Bass guitar, guitar, keyboards
- Years active: 1966–present

Douglas Farthing Hatlelid (born August 27, 1942), better known as Chip Douglas, is an American songwriter, musician (bass, guitar and keyboards), and record producer, whose most famous work was during the 1960s. He was the bassist of The Turtles for a short period of time and the producer of some of the Monkees' biggest hits, including "Daydream Believer" and "Pleasant Valley Sunday".

== Early career ==
Douglas was raised in Hawaii and began his musical career with a folk group he formed in high school, "The Wilcox Three", modeled after The Kingston Trio. During a trip to California, they were discovered by a well-known booking agency and signed by RCA/Camden to record an album at their studios in Hollywood. He performed in the group using the name "Chip Douglas", which would be the name he would use for the rest of his career (though he would occasionally use his real name as a songwriter).

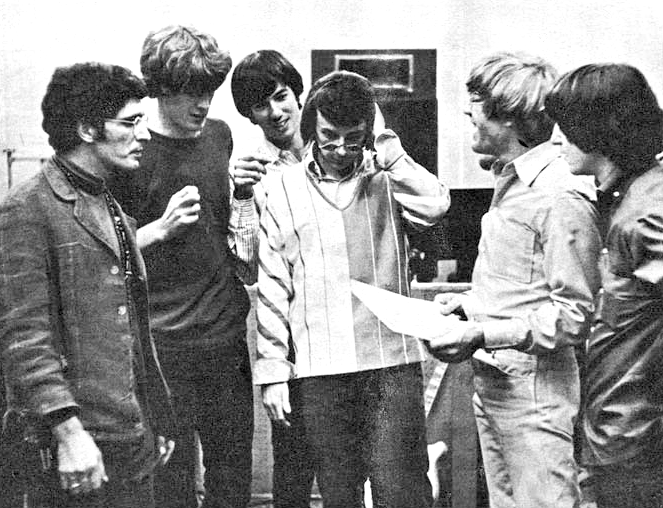
Chip Douglas with the MFQ and Phil Spector at Gold Star Studios in 1965 (from left to right): Cyrus Faryar, Jerry Yester, Chip Douglas, Phil Spector, Henry Diltz, Eddie Hoh.

The group dissolved and Douglas, along with Cyrus Faryar and noted rock photographer Henry Diltz, formed the Modern Folk Quartet (along with musician Jerry Yester) in Los Angeles. They were signed by Warner Bros. and recorded two albums: Modern Folk Quartet and Changes. They also appeared as themselves in a nightclub scene for the Warner Bros. movie Palm Springs Weekend, starring Connie Stevens and Troy Donahue (1963). MFQ spent the next several years touring the U.S. playing college concerts.

The Modern Folk Quartet was signed by producer Phil Spector in 1966, and recorded a song, "This Could Be the Night", co-written by Spector and up-and-coming singer-songwriter Harry Nilsson. The record was not released at that time, but Douglas and Nilsson became friends. In the latter half of 1966, Douglas was a member of the short-lived Gene Clark Group, a band featuring the ex-Byrds Gene Clark, ex-Grass Roots Joel Larson, and Bill Rinehart, formerly of the Leaves. Clark disbanded the group at the end of that year without having recorded or released any records.

== The Turtles ==
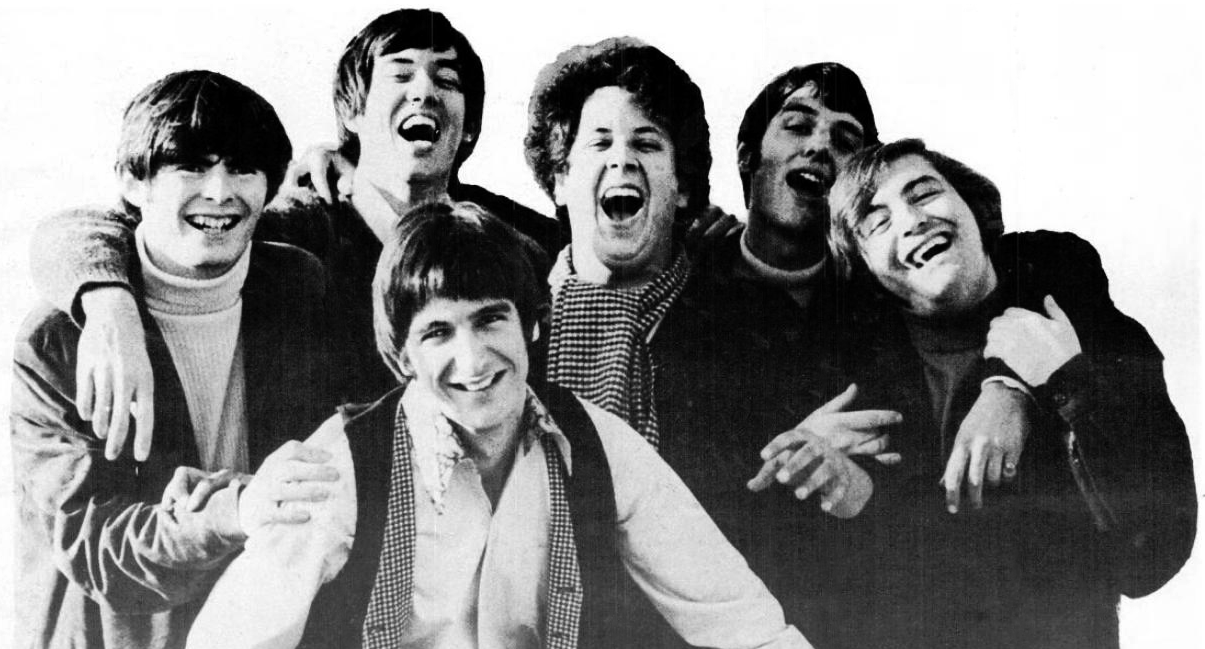
Chip Douglas with The Turtles in 1967 (from left to right): Al Nichol, Chip Douglas, John Barbata, Mark Volman, Jim Tucker, Howard Kaylan.

When the Turtles' bassist Chuck Portz was fired from the band, Douglas was asked to take his place. His first record with them was "Happy Together", which they'd decided to record after hearing a well-worn demo that had been passed on by numerous other artists. Douglas played bass and did the arrangement that was recorded, and it became a huge hit for The Turtles, ousting the Beatles' "Penny Lane" from the #1 single position on the American pop charts.

Seeing the Turtles perform at Hollywood's Whisky a Go Go in early 1967, the Monkees' Michael Nesmith approached Douglas and asked if he would like to become the new producer for the band, who were tired of the "manufactured" recording setup they were accustomed to. Douglas answered, "I've never produced a record in my life." Nesmith, who had produced album tracks for the group, but had little influence with their label Colgems Records, assured him, "Don't worry; if you're willing to quit The Turtles, I'll show you everything you need to do."

Douglas's final appearances with the Turtles were in February 1967. He was replaced by Jim Pons of the Leaves.

== The Monkees ==
Douglas accepted Nesmith's offer, and joined the Monkees in the studio, first to create a new single with all four Monkees playing. It couldn't be released because of a publishing restriction imposed by Screen Gems (who both produced the Monkees series and controlled their music publishing). Douglas's next Monkees project was their Headquarters album. Recorded over six steady weeks of sessions at the RCA Studios in Hollywood, Headquarters was the first album to feature the Monkees playing on every track. Douglas contributed a song, "Forget That Girl", and joined them on bass guitar in the studio. The album was released in the spring of 1967, and began a steady climb up the charts, eventually reaching #1 on Billboard's album chart, but was displaced by the Beatles' Sgt. Pepper's Lonely Hearts Club Band.

No singles from Headquarters were issued in the United States, but a non-album song from the same sessions, "The Girl I Knew Somewhere", reached the top 40 as a B-side. Douglas produced the hit single "Pleasant Valley Sunday" (written by Gerry Goffin and Carole King), which featured Douglas on bass and an innovative guitar intro composed by Douglas and played by Nesmith. Douglas produced the next Monkees' album, Pisces, Aquarius, Capricorn, & Jones, Ltd., on which he also played bass. Unlike Headquarters, it was done in several different studios around the U.S. between Monkees tour dates.

Douglas also introduced members of the Monkees to new songwriters, including John Stewart, who wrote "Daydream Believer", which would become their second-biggest all-time single and was included on the 1968 album The Birds, The Bees & The Monkees. Douglas also introduced the band members to Harry Nilsson, who played them a selection of his original songs, and became friends with the band. One of the songs, "Cuddly Toy", was covered by the Monkees, and featured on both the Pisces album and an episode of their TV series. Douglas has been quoted as saying, "I like to think I gave Harry his big break, which resulted in a record deal with RCA."

Douglas was pleased to have made hit records with the Monkees, but was disappointed that they weren't able to erase the common misconception that The Monkees weren't actually musicians, and that the press took little notice of their accomplishments.

== The Turtles, revisited ==
As 1967 ended, the Monkees wanted to take full control of their music, and said farewell to Douglas, who became a producer for the Turtles. The first project was The Turtles Present the Battle of the Bands album, the name of which was taken from the title track, co-written by Douglas and Harry Nilsson. It also included two more Turtles' top-ten hits: "Elenore" and "You Showed Me".

Douglas had performed "You Showed Me" with Gene Clark in 1966, while he was a member of the Gene Clark Group. Originally an uptempo number, the slow, moody arrangement came about by accident. Douglas was demonstrating the song for vocalists Howard Kaylan and Mark Volman, on an organ whose bellows was broken, requiring him to play it slowly. Douglas told them "This isn't the way it's supposed to sound", but Kaylan and Volman disagreed, thinking the new tempo would be perfect.

== The Monkees, revisited ==
Douglas kept in touch with the Monkees and returned in 1969 to record his composition "Steam Engine" with Micky Dolenz on vocals. The song appeared in reruns of their TV show.

In 1976, Douglas re-teamed with Dolenz, Jones, and Tork to record the single, "Christmas Is My Time of Year", co-written by Douglas and Howard Kaylan. By then, Nesmith was no longer affiliated with the group.

In 1986, a Monkees reunion tour reawakened interest in the band, and Rhino Records reissued all their original albums, including their work with Douglas.

Douglas has appeared in several documentaries about the Monkees, reminiscing about his work with the band.

== Post Monkees ==
In 1969, Douglas produced the album Hand Sown...Home Grown, the first solo album by Douglas' then-girlfriend Linda Ronstadt.

The Modern Folk Quartet reunited in 1975 and began to perform again, often appearing at the Ice House in Pasadena, California. For several years, they teamed up with ex-Kingston Trio member Dave Guard to back him in his solo act. In the 1980s, the Modern Folk Quartet recorded several albums for a Japanese record company. They also toured Japan, where they remain popular (1988, 1990, 2003, 2005, 2011 and 2016).

Douglas continues to write and produce records in a variety of genres, and divides his time between California and Hawaii.

== Bibliography ==
- Baker, Glenn A.; Tom Czarnota; Peter Hogan (1986). Monkeemania : The True Story of the Monkees. New York: St. Martin's Press. ISBN 978-0312000035. OCLC 14586450.
- Lefcowitz, Eric (1985). The Monkees Tale. Berkeley, California: Last Gasp. ISBN 978-0867193381. OCLC 13003875.
