= List of The Monkees episodes =

This is a list of episodes of the television series The Monkees, which aired on NBC on Monday nights at 7:30 p.m. Eastern from 1966 to 1968.

The first songs listed are from the original NBC broadcasts. Over the summer of 1967, NBC reran multiple episodes with revised soundtracks to promote the Monkees' current album Headquarters and the singles released during that summer. Between 1969 and 1973, CBS (and later ABC) reran the episodes on Saturday morning, revising the soundtracks once again to promote the albums The Monkees Present and Changes. All alternate songs are listed where applicable.

Tracks with different mixes or versions as compared to the album versions are indicated.

== Series overview ==
Season	Episodes	Originally released	
Season	Episodes	First released	Last released
1	32	September 12, 1966	April 24, 1967
2	26	September 11, 1967	March 25, 1968

== Episodes ==
=== Season 1 (1966–1967) ===
Debuting on September 12, 1966, the series aired on Monday nights at 7:30 p.m. Eastern, preceding I Dream of Jeannie and opposite The Iron Horse (ABC) and Gilligan's Island (CBS). A few episodes were aired in different chronological order than when they were filmed, such as episode 8, "Don't Look a Gift Horse in the Mouth" and the pilot as episode 10.

Some syndicated and overseas versions of episode (such as many of those used by the BBC in the United Kingdom when it ran the series several times) use the second-season version of the opening credits in place of the original first-season version.

List of The Monkees season 1 episodes
No. overall	No. in season	Title	Directed by	Written by	Original release date
1	1	"Royal Flush"	James Frawley	Robert Schlitt and Peter Meyerson	September 12, 1966
The Monkees rescue Princess Bettina, (Katherine Walsh), the Duchess of Harmonica, from a drowning, only to find that her evil uncle Archduke Otto (Theodore Marcuse) is trying to dispose of her in an attempt to take the duchy's throne. Songs: "This Just Doesn't Seem to Be My Day", "Take a Giant Step"; 1967 reruns: "You Told Me", "The Girl I Knew Somewhere” Saturday mornings: "Apples, Peaches, Bananas and Pears", "Good Clean Fun"
2	2	"Monkee See, Monkee Die"	James Frawley	Treva Silverman	September 19, 1966
The Monkees attend the reading of a late millionaire's will, and find themselves forced to stay the night in his haunted castle. Songs: "Last Train to Clarksville", "Tomorrow's Gonna Be Another Day"; 1967 reruns: "Tomorrow's Gonna Be Another Day" was replaced with "A Little Bit Me, A Little Bit You".
3	3	"Monkee vs. Machine"	Robert Rafelson	David Panich	September 26, 1966
In a computerized toy factory, the Monkees foil an efficiency expert (Stan Freberg) who wants to replace an old toymaker (Walter Janovitz) with automation. Songs: "Saturday's Child" (alternate vocal track), "Last Train to Clarksville"; 1967 reruns: "Saturday's Child" was replaced with "You Told Me."; Saturday mornings: "Saturday's Child" was replaced with "Listen to the Band."
4	4	"Your Friendly Neighborhood Kidnappers"	James Frawley	Dave Evans	October 3, 1966
After reaching the finals in a talent contest, the Monkees are required to use the services of Nick Trump (Andre Philippe), a PR man. The first two publicity stunts fail, so Nick suggests the band to be kidnapped and then to show up at the last minute to raise excitement. Nick, however, is secretly working for their rivals, the Four Swines. Songs: "Let's Dance On," "(I'm Not Your) Steppin' Stone," "Last Train to Clarksville"; 1967 reruns: "A Little Bit Me, A Little Bit You," "The Girl I Knew Somewhere"; Saturday mornings: "Last Train to Clarksville" was replaced with "Do You Feel It Too?"
5	5	"The Spy Who Came in from the Cool"	Robert Rafelson	Gerald Gardner and Dee Caruso	October 10, 1966
The Monkees get mixed up with two foreign spies (Jacques Aubuchon and Arlene Martel) after Davy unwittingly purchases a set of red maracas containing secret microfilm. Songs: "The Kind of Girl I Could Love," "(I'm Not Your) Steppin' Stone," "All the King's Horses," "Saturday's Child" (album version); 1967 reruns: "Saturday's Child" was replaced with "Randy Scouse Git."; Saturday mornings: "Saturday's Child" was replaced with "All Alone in the Dark."
6	6	"Success Story"	James Frawley	Gerald Gardner, Dee Caruso and Bernie Orenstein	October 17, 1966
Davy's grandfather (Ben Wright), who believes his grandson has become wealthy and successful, pays a visit; it forces the guys to work as Davy's "employees" in an attempt to make the charade stick. Songs: "I Wanna Be Free," "Sweet Young Thing"; 1967 reruns: "I Wanna Be Free" was replaced with "Shades of Gray."; Saturday mornings: "I Wanna Be Free" was replaced with "French Song."
7	7	"Monkees in a Ghost Town"	James Frawley	Robert Schlitt and Peter Meyerson	October 24, 1966
Stranded in a ghost town after the Monkeemobile runs out of gas, the Monkees are held prisoner by bank robbers (Len Lesser, Lon Chaney Jr.) and their boss, "the Big Man" (Rose Marie). Songs: "Tomorrow's Gonna Be Another Day," "Papa Gene's Blues," "(Theme from) The Monkees"; 1967 reruns: "Words" (single version) replaced "Tomorrow's Gonna Be Another Day."
8	8	"Don't Look a Gift Horse in the Mouth"	Robert Rafelson	Dave Evans	October 31, 1966
Despite landlord Mr. Babbitt (Henry Corden) forbidding any pets, Davy brings home an equine to horsesit. The boys get a taste of farm living when they return the steed to a father and child (Jim Boles and Kerry MacLane); the adventure also sees Davy race the horse against one belonging to the father's neighbor. Songs: "Papa Gene's Blues," "All the King's Horses"; Saturday mornings: "I Never Thought It Peculiar" replaced "All the King's Horses." Note: Character actor and frequent Bob Hope sideman Jerry Colonna, in his last acting credit, appears as veterinarian Dr. Mann.
9	9	"The Chaperone"	Bruce Kessler	Dee Caruso and Gerald Gardner	November 7, 1966
To help Davy gain a date with retired general Harley Vandenberg's (Arch Johnson) daughter, Leslie (Sherry Alberoni), Micky poses as a female chaperone at a party after the real chaperone (Diana Chesney) gets drunk; "Mrs. Arcadian" arouses the attention of both General Vandenberg and landlord Mr. Babbitt. Songs: "This Just Doesn't Seem to Be My Day," "Take a Giant Step" (alternate vocal track), "You Just May Be the One" (original version); Saturday mornings: "Midnight Train" replaced "This Just Doesn't Seem to Be My Day."
10	10	"Here Come the Monkees (Pilot)"	Mike Elliot	Paul Mazursky and Larry Tucker	November 14, 1966
When the band auditions for a sweet sixteen party. Davy and the birthday girl Vanessa (Robyn Millan) fall for each other. After several dates, she neglects her schoolwork, and fails her history exam; so Davy and the gang help her study. They then try to get the security guard of her family's country club premises. Songs: "I Wanna Be Free" (fast and original album versions), "Let's Dance On"; 1967 reruns: "Shades of Gray" replaced "I Wanna Be Free." Notes This is an edited version of the original series pilot that was shot in November 1965 and pitched to NBC. Producer Bob Rafelson re-edited it after it tested poorly, and NBC then picked up the series. The tag features screen tests of Davy and Mike filmed on the sets of The Farmer's Daughter. The Monkees arrive at the party not in the Monkeemobile (which was built after the show was picked up by NBC) but in a red-and-yellow "woodie" station wagon. Bing Russell makes a brief appearance as the Monkees' manager, but he is not seen or mentioned again in the series.
11	11	"Monkees à la Carte"	James Frawley	Gerald Gardner, Dee Caruso and Bernie Orenstein	November 21, 1966
The Monkees' favorite Italian restaurant is taken over by a gangster (Harvey Lembeck). After getting rehired as staff, and consulting with the police, they try to gather evidence linking the gangsters to a criminal Syndicate. They later pose as members of the Purple Flower Gang to listen into their meeting. Songs: "(I'm Not Your) Steppin' Stone," "She"
12	12	"I've Got a Little Song Here"	Bruce Kessler	Treva Silverman	November 28, 1966
After Mike is fleeced by a fraudulent music publisher (Phil Leeds), Micky acts as a flashy Hollywood producer to get Mike's money back. Songs: "Gonna Buy Me a Dog", "Mary, Mary"; 1967 reruns: "For Pete's Sake" replaced "Mary, Mary."; Saturday mornings: "Steam Engine," a song not on any albums or singles during the series' run on the networks, replaced "Mary, Mary." Note: First appearance of Davy, Peter and Micky in their Monkeemen superhero costumes.
13	13	"One Man Shy" "Peter and the Debutante"	James Frawley	Gerald Gardner, Dee Caruso and Treva Silverman	December 5, 1966
With the band's help, bashful Peter tries to win the heart of lovely debutante Valerie Cartwright (Lisa James) while dealing with her haughty boyfriend Ronnie Farnsworth (George Furth). Songs: "I'm a Believer", "You Just May Be the One" (original version); 1967 reruns: "I'm a Believer" was replaced with "Forget That Girl."; Saturday mornings: "I'm a Believer" was replaced with "If I Knew."
14	14	"Dance, Monkee, Dance"	James Frawley	Bernie Orenstein	December 12, 1966
Peter wins a free dance lesson at Renaldo's (Hal March) Dance Au Go Go; the rest of the band follows suit, only to learn that they've signed lifetime contracts. Songs: "I'll Be Back Up on My Feet" (original version), "I'm a Believer"; Saturday mornings: "If You Have the Time," which did not appear on any albums or singles at the time
15	15	"Too Many Girls" "Davy and Fern"	James Frawley	Story by : Dave Evans; Teleplay by : Dave Evans, Gerald Gardner & Dee Caruso	December 19, 1966
A gypsy tea room owner (Reta Shaw) predicts Davy will fall in love within 24 hours and leave the group. Her true plan, though, is to force Davy to join her daughter, Fern (Kelly Jean Peters), in a talent show competition. It forces the rest of the Monkees to enter the show (Peter as a magician, Mike as a folk singer, Micky as an impressionist). Songs: "(I'm Not Your) Steppin' Stone" (performed live on set), "I'm a Believer", "Different Drum" (played for laughs). Notes: The episode includes a beauty pageant scene in which Fern appears wearing a bathing suit, but NBC blurred Kelly Jean Peters' cleavage. The syndicated reruns from the 1970s showed her uncensored. In the talent show, Mike (as singer "Billy Ray Hodstetter") comically plays a sped-up version of ""Different Drum," a song he authored that became the first major hit of Linda Ronstadt (with the Stone Poneys).
16	16	"Son of a Gypsy"	James Frawley	Story by : Treva Silverman; Teleplay by : Gerald Gardner, Dee Caruso and Treva Silverman	December 26, 1966
After they get a party gig at Madame Rantha's mansion ahead of a quartet of musical gypsy brothers; the gypsies' mother, Maria, (Jeanne Arnold), forces the Monkees to steal a priceless statuette, the Maltese Vulture, from the Rantha mansion. Songs: "Let's Dance On," "I'm a Believer"
17	17	"The Case of the Missing Monkee"	Robert Rafelson	Gerald Gardner and Dee Caruso	January 9, 1967
Peter becomes involved in a kidnapping plot against the respected rocket science professor Milo Schnitzler (Norbert Schiller), and winds up disappearing himself. Songs: "(I'm Not Your) Steppin' Stone"; 1967 reruns: "Pleasant Valley Sunday"
18	18	"I Was a Teenage Monster"	Sidney Miller	Story by : Dave Evans; Teleplay by : Gerald Gardner, Dee Caruso and Dave Evans	January 16, 1967
Mad scientist Dr. Mendoza (John Hoyt) and his assistant Groot (Byron Foulger) hire the Monkees to teach music to the monster they've built (Richard Kiel), only to instead transplant their talents into the beast. Songs: "Tomorrow's Gonna Be Another Day," "Your Auntie Grizelda"; Saturday mornings: "Your Auntie Grizelda" was replaced with "Good Clean Fun."
19	19	"Find the Monkees" "The Audition"	Richard Nunis	Dave Evans	January 23, 1967
When television producer Hubbell Bensen (Carl Ballantine) hears a tape of the Monkees, he frantically stages auditions in the hope of finding them for his new television show, unaware that they've been desperately trying to audition for him. Songs: "Sweet Young Thing," "Papa Gene's Blues," "Mary, Mary" Note: This episode's epilogue tag, lasting an abnormally long 3 minutes, features an interview segment with the band and producer Robert Rafelson discussing the recent Sunset Strip curfew riots, which Micky Dolenz had witnessed.
20	20	"Monkees in the Ring"	James Frawley	Gerald Gardner and Dee Caruso	January 30, 1967
A crooked fight promoter (Ned Glass) prepares to cash in on a big bet by making Davy a stooge in a bout with the champ. Songs: "Laugh" (without background vocals on first verse), "I'll Be Back Up on My Feet" (original version); Saturday mornings: "Looking for the Good Times"
21	21	"The Prince and the Paupers"	James Komack	Story by : Peter Meyerson; Teleplay by : Gerald Gardner and Dee Caruso	February 6, 1967
The band convinces Davy to swap places with his doppelganger, a shy prince who wants to win the heart of young socialite Wendy Forsythe (Heather North) so that he can marry before his 18th birthday and avoid forfeiting his country's throne to evil Count Myron (Oscar Beregi Jr.). Songs: "Mary, Mary"; Saturday mornings: "99 Pounds" Note: In scenes with both Davy and the prince, disc jockey Rodney Bingenheimer was used as Davy's double, seen from the back only.
22	22	"Monkees at the Circus"	Bruce Kessler	David Panich	February 13, 1967
To save a financially bankrupt circus, the Monkees pose as a troupe of dazzling high-wire artists from France known as the Mozzarelli Brothers, but get in trouble when their guise requires them to actually perform as aerialists. Songs: "Sometime in the Morning," "She" Note: References to Micky's previous TV series Circus Boy are made throughout.
23	23	"Captain Crocodile"	James Frawley	Story by : Peter Meyerson & Robert Schlitt; Teleplay by : Gerald Gardner, Dee Caruso, Peter Meyerson and Robert Schlitt	February 20, 1967
The Monkees' appearance on the children's program The Captain Crocodile Show is sabotaged by its host (Joey Forman), who fears that his guests' popularity is diminishing his own. Songs: "Valleri" (original version), "Your Auntie Grizelda"; 1967 reruns: "Pleasant Valley Sunday" replaced "Your Auntie Grizelda." Note: This episode contains parodies of TV shows What's My Line?, To Tell the Truth, and Batman.
24	24	"Monkees à la Mode"	Alex Singer	Gerald Gardner and Dee Caruso	February 27, 1967
The Monkees are chosen as the typical young Americans of the year by Chic magazine, but feel adverse effects when the publication falsely presents them as clean-cut young men. Songs: "(Theme from) The Monkees" (excerpts), "Laugh," "You Just May Be the One" (original version); Saturday mornings: "Oh My My" replaced "Laugh." Notes: Micky plays the kettle drum portion of "Randy Scouse Git" when drumming on the table.
25	25	"Alias Micky Dolenz"	Bruce Kessler	Story by : Dave Evans; Teleplay by : Gerald Gardner, Dee Caruso and Dave Evans	March 6, 1967
The police cash in on Micky's striking resemblance to imprisoned crime kingpin Baby Face Morales in an attempt to bring down the rest of Baby Face's gang and locate missing robbery loot. Songs: "The Kind of Girl I Could Love," "Mary, Mary" Notes: A stand-in doubles for Micky in scenes that he shares with Baby Face. Davy does not appear in the plot of the episode, but he speaks in the closing interview tag explaining his absence.
26	26	"Monkees Chow Mein"	James Frawley	Gerald Gardner and Dee Caruso	March 13, 1967
Peter finds a secret message in a fortune cookie at a Chinese restaurant, forcing Monkeemen Davy and Mike to come to his rescue from the evil Dragonman (Joey Forman). Songs: "Your Auntie Grizelda"; 1967 reruns: "Words" (single version) Notes: References to Get Smart are made throughout. Second appearance of the Monkees as the Monkeemen, as Davy and Mike wear the costumes to rescue Peter and Micky. The episode also features Mike Farrell in a role as an FBI agent.
27	27	"Monkee Mother"	James Frawley	Peter Meyerson and Robert Schlitt	March 20, 1967
Middle-aged widow Millie Rudnick (Rose Marie) moves in with the Monkees, but in a need to keep their personal space, the boys soon try to find her a husband. Songs: "Sometime in the Morning," "Look Out (Here Comes Tomorrow)" Note: This was only one of two episodes featured entirely at the Monkees' house, the other being Season 2's "A Coffin Too Frequent".
28	28	"Monkees on the Line"	James Frawley	Gerald Gardner, Dee Caruso and Coslough Johnson	March 27, 1967
Instead of getting themselves a telephone answering service, the Monkees are hired by one; Peter's actions on one call leads to the group's pursuit by a crooked bettor (Milton Frome). Songs: "Look Out (Here Comes Tomorrow)"; Saturday mornings: "Little Girl"
29	29	"Monkees Get Out More Dirt"	Gerald Shepard	Gerald Gardner and Dee Caruso	April 3, 1967
The Monkees' friendship is threatened when they all fall for and aim to woo the same girl, laundromat proprietress April Conquest (Julie Newmar). Songs: "(Theme from) The Monkees," "The Girl I Knew Somewhere"; Saturday mornings: "Steam Engine" replaced "The Girl I Knew Somewhere." Note: Wally Cox makes a cameo appearance in the teaser.
30	30	"Monkees Manhattan Style" "Monkees in Manhattan"	Russell Mayberry	Gerald Gardner and Dee Caruso	April 10, 1967
In New York City, the Monkees fend off an irate hotel manager (Philip Ober) as they help a financially strained producer (Richard Anders) get backing for a Broadway musical. Songs: "The Girl I Knew Somewhere," "Look Out (Here Comes Tomorrow)" (with extra instrumental passage), "Words" (original version); Saturday mornings: "Acapulco Sun" replaced "The Girl I Knew Somewhere." Note: The plot loosely follows that of the Marx Brothers' 1938 film Room Service.
31	31	"Monkees at the Movies"	Russ Mayberry	Gerald Gardner and Dee Caruso	April 17, 1967
Davy is selected to replace a snobbish film idol (Bobby Sherman) in a beach movie. Songs: "A Little Bit Me, a Little Bit You," "Last Train to Clarksville," "Valleri" (original version)
32	32	"Monkees on Tour"	Robert Rafelson	Robert Rafelson	April 24, 1967
Scripted antics take a back seat to music in this mini-documentary chronicling the Monkees' trip to Phoenix as part of their first concert tour. Songs: "The Girl I Knew Somewhere," "I'm a Believer"; 1967 reruns: "Pleasant Valley Sunday" replaced "The Girl I Knew Somewhere," and "Words" (single version) replaced "I'm a Believer. Saturday mornings: "Steam Engine" replaced "The Girl I Knew Somewhere."; Concert songs: "Last Train to Clarksville," "Sweet Young Thing," "Mary, Mary," "Cripple Creek," "You Can't Judge a Book by the Cover," "I Wanna Be Free," "I Got a Woman," "(I'm Not Your) Steppin' Stone." Notes: First episode with no laugh track. The teaser, in which Davy makes introductory remarks, was filmed on the set of Bewitched and was filmed during the Headquarters sessions (as evidenced by Mike's, Micky's and Peter's beards). The on-location scenes in Phoenix were filmed in January 1967.

=== Season 2 (1967–1968) ===
The series aired on Monday nights preceding The Man from U.N.C.L.E., Rowan and Martin's Laugh-In, and The Champions and opposite Cowboy in Africa (ABC) and Gunsmoke (CBS). "For Pete's Sake" from the Headquarters album replaced the "Monkees Theme" as the closing song during this season.

List of The Monkees season 2 episodes
No. overall	No. in season	Title	Directed by	Written by	Original release date
33	1	"A Nice Place to Visit" "The Monkees in Mexico"	James Frawley	Treva Silverman	September 11, 1967
In El Monotono, Mexico, Davy is captured by the notorious bandito El Diablo (Peter Whitney) and his minions after he becomes "captivated" with El Diablo's girlfriend (Cynthia Hull). Song: "What Am I Doing Hangin' 'Round?" Note: Featuring a cameo appearance by Godfrey Cambridge
34	2	"The Picture Frame" "The Bank Robbery"	James Frawley	Jack Winter	September 18, 1967
Peter must prove the Monkees' innocence at trial when they unwittingly rob a bank in the pretext of making a movie for two con men (Cliff Norton and Kelton Garwood). Songs: "Pleasant Valley Sunday," "Randy Scouse Git"
35	3	"Everywhere a Sheik, Sheik"	Alex Singer	Jack Winter	September 25, 1967
It's a "harem-scare 'em" scene as Davy faces the prospect of marriage to a lovely Nehudian princess (Donna Loren), who selected his face from a magazine in an effort to avoid marrying her country's evil prime minister. Songs: "Love is Only Sleeping" (alternate mix), "Cuddly Toy" Note: First of seven episodes to feature Monte Landis, and the only episode in which he does not play the villain. Anita Mann appears in the "Cuddly Toy" video segment dancing alongside Davy.
36	4	"Monkee Mayor"	Alex Singer	Jack Winter	October 2, 1967
Mike casts his wool hat into the political ring to stop a crooked construction tycoon (Monte Landis) from turning the city into parking lots. Songs: "No Time," "Pleasant Valley Sunday"
37	5	"Art for Monkees' Sake"	Alex Singer	Coslough Johnson	October 9, 1967
With great detail, Peter copies an art museum painting for a pair of crooked museum guards (Monte Landis and Vic Tayback) aiming to steal the original; it causes the Monkees to mount "Mission: Ridiculous" and swap the real work back in. Songs: "Randy Scouse Git," "Daydream Believer" Note: Liberace makes a cameo in which, inspired by Raphael Montañez Ortiz, he smashes his piano with a sledgehammer as "performance art".
38	6	"I Was a 99-Pound Weakling" "Physical Culture"	Alex Singer	Story by : Jon C. Andersen; Teleplay by : Gerald Gardner & Dee Caruso and Neil Burstyn	October 16, 1967
After losing girlfriend Brenda to a muscle man named Bulk (David Draper), Micky starts a health program under the guidance of fraudulent physical cultist Shah-Ku (Monte Landis). Songs: "Sunny Girlfriend," "Love is Only Sleeping" (alternate mix) Notes: Michael Nesmith does not appear due to a tonsillectomy; his absence is noted throughout. The other guys appear as the Monkeemen during the musical "romp" scene (to "Sunny Girlfriend"). Professional wrestler Nick Bockwinkel appears as a Shah-Ku strongman.
39	7	"Hillbilly Honeymoon" "Double Barrel Shotgun Wedding"	James Frawley	Peter Meyerson	October 23, 1967
Lost in Swineville, the Monkees get caught in the middle of a hillbilly feud between the Weskitts and Chubbers, with Davy staring down the barrel of a shotgun wedding to pretty Ella Mae Chubber (Melody Patterson). Song: "Papa Gene's Blues" (extended edit) Note: First appearance of the "Isn't that dumb?" catchphrase.
40	8	"Monkees Marooned"	James Frawley	Stanley Ralph Ross	October 30, 1967
A gullible Peter trades his guitar for a con man’s treasure map, which leads the Monkees to a deserted island — where they're hunted by a mad Australian treasure hunter (Monte Landis) and his man Thursday (Rupert Crosse). Songs: "Daydream Believer," "What Am I Doing Hangin' 'Round?"; Saturday mornings: "Do You Feel It Too?" replaced "Daydream Believer."
41	9	"The Card Carrying Red Shoes"	James Frawley	Treva Silverman	November 6, 1967
Peter is the target of a romantic prima ballerina (Ondine Vaughn) and a dastardly plot choreographed by the rest of the Druvanian National Ballet, who want valuable microfilm implanted in one of her shoes. Song: "She Hangs Out" (alternate mix) Notes: Mike appears only in a musical number at the episode's end.
42	10	"The Wild Monkees"	Jon C. Andersen	Story by : Stanley Ralph Ross and Corey Upton; Teleplay by : Stanley Ralph Ross	November 13, 1967
The Monkees turn chicken when, while serving as both entertainment and staff at "The Henry Cabot Lodge and Cemetery," they unwittingly impress the girlfriends of a tough motorcycle gang. Songs: "Goin' Down" (sung live over instrumental track in the teaser), "Star Collector" (without Moog synthesizer); Saturday mornings: "Looking for the Good Times" replaced "Star Collector."
43	11	"A Coffin Too Frequent"	David Winters	Stella Linden	November 20, 1967
A mad scientist (George Furth), his goony cousin (Mickey Morton), and his dotty aunt (Ruth Buzzi) use the Monkees' pad for a séance to summon their relative, Elmer, from beyond the grave. Songs: "Goin' Down," "Daydream Believer"; Saturday mornings: "Oklahoma Backroom Dancer" replaced "Goin' Down."
44	12	"Hitting the High Seas"	James Frawley	Jack Winter	November 27, 1967
Thoughts of mutiny are bountiful as the Monkees try to stop the hijacking of a cargo ship by a vengeful sea captain (Chips Rafferty). Songs: "Daydream Believer," "Star Collector"; Saturday mornings: "Oh My My" replaced "Daydream Believer." Notes: First Season 2 episode without a laugh track. Mike only appears briefly, sitting out most of the episode due to seasickness.
45	13	"The Monkees in Texas"	James Frawley	Jack Winter	December 4, 1967
In the Lone Star State, the Monkees battle Black Bart (Barton MacLane), cohort Red (Len Lesser), and their gang to save Mike's aunt, Kate, (Jacqueline deWit), and her valuable Nesmith Ranch. Songs: "Words," "Goin' Down" (sung live over the instrumental track in the tag) Note: No laugh track.
46	14	"The Monkees on the Wheel"	Jerry Shepard	Coslough Johnson	December 11, 1967
"Magic Fingers" Micky wins big at a Las Vegas roulette table, unaware that it's been rigged. After a roulette dealer (Rip Taylor) and policeman (Dort Clark) mistake the band for the crooks, the Monkees are given 24 hours to find the real perpetrators (David Astor and Pepper Davis) and return the money to the casino. Songs: "The Door Into Summer," "Cuddly Toy" Notes: No laugh track. First appearance of the "Save the Texas Prairie Chicken" catchphrase.
47	15	"The Monkees' Christmas Show"	Jon C. Andersen	Story by : Dave Evans and Neil Burstyn; Teleplay by : Neil Burstyn	December 25, 1967
The Monkees try to instill the spirit of Christmas in a cynical, neglected little boy (Butch Patrick) who has soured on the whole idea of the holiday. Song: "Riu Chiu" (sung by the Monkees a cappella) Notes: No laugh track. Instead of the show's standard closing credits card, the Monkees appear on-set and invite many of the behind-the-scenes staff and crew members to appear with them on camera (the credits are superimposed over the joyful crowd). As part of an elf costume, Davy wears Mike's iconic green wool cap.
48	16	"Fairy Tale"	James Frawley	Peter Meyerson	January 8, 1968
A Monkee pantomime romp through Fairy Tale Land, introduced by a "Town Crier" (Rege Cordic), sees "Peter, peasant of Tork" rescuing a haughty princess (Mike) from death by her fiendish fiancé (Murray Roman), with the help of a chain-mail suit (from tailor Davy), a magic sword (from innkeeper Micky), and gravity-defying shoes (from cobbler Mike). Song: "Daily Nightly" Note: No laugh track. In addition to the above mentioned characters, Davy also appears as Little Red Riding Hood, Micky as Goldilocks, and both as Hansel & Gretel.
49	17	"The Monkees Watch Their Feet" "Micky and the Outer Space Creatures"	Alex Singer	Coslough Johnson	January 15, 1968
A documented film report by the Department of UFO Information, narrated by its secretary (Pat Paulsen), shows Davy and Peter battling invading space aliens (Stuart Margolin and Nita Talbot) from Planet Zlotnick who've replaced Micky with a robotic lookalike. Song: "Star Collector" Note: Michael Nesmith only appears in the opening and closing segments with Pat Paulsen.
50	18	"The Monstrous Monkee Mash"	James Frawley	Neil Burstyn & David Panich	January 22, 1968
Davy is under the spell of girlfriend Lorelei (Arlene Martel), or to be more precise her magic necklace; it's part of a plot by Lorelei's uncle, Count Batula (Ron Masak), to transform Davy into a vampire, forcing the remaining Monkees to look for Davy in a monstorously-populated castle. Song: "Goin' Down"; Saturday mornings: "Bye Bye, Baby, Bye Bye" Note: No laugh track
51	19	"The Monkee's Paw"	James Frawley	Coslough Johnson	January 29, 1968
A down-on-his-luck magician (Hans Conried) sells Micky a magical monkey's paw that brings the equally broken-down Monkees bad luck. Songs: "Goin' Down", "Words" Note: No laugh track
52	20	"The Devil and Peter Tork"	James Frawley	Story by : Robert Kaufman; Teleplay by : Robert Kaufman and Gerald Gardner & Dee Caruso	February 5, 1968
At an eerie pawn shop, Peter unwittingly sells his soul to devilish character Mr. Zero (Monte Landis) in order to purchase a golden harp (despite never having played the instrument previously). Songs: "Salesman," "Pleasant Valley Sunday" (harp instrumental), "I Wanna Be Free" (harp instrumental), "No Time"; Saturday mornings: "I Never Thought It Peculiar" replaced "Salesman." Note: Final episode in which Mike Nesmith is seen wearing his green wool hat, an item he would rarely wear during Season 2 (this episode was filmed early in the season's production calendar). He is seen wearing it again briefly in the next-to-last episode, "The Monkees Blow Their Minds".
53	21	"The Monkees Race Again" "Leave the Driving to Us"	James Frawley	Dave Evans and Elias Davis & David Pollock	February 12, 1968
Davy drives the Monkeemobile in an auto race when the British entry (owned by an old friend of Davy's grandfather) is sabotaged by Baron Von Klutz (David Hurst) and his Klutzmobile. Song: "What Am I Doing Hangin' 'Round?" Notes: No laugh track. The 'Klutzmobile' is the original Shelby Cobra Daytona Coupe (chassis #CSX2287). Series co-producer Bob Rafelson has a cameo appearance as the "World's Oldest Flower Child".
54	22	"The Monkees in Paris" "The Paris Show"	Robert Rafelson	Robert Rafelson	February 19, 1968
Tired of saying the same monotonous lines week in and week out, the Monkees leave the studio grind behind and travel to Paris, where gendarmes and amorous women pursue them; while they're away, the director (James Frawley) thinks of ways to make the script more unique. Songs: "Love is Only Sleeping" (album mix), "Don't Call on Me," "Star Collector," "Goin' Down"; Saturday mornings: "Oh My My," "I Love You Better," "Tell Me Love" Note: No laugh track. The Paris scenes were filmed on-location in June 1967 and done with little dialogue (outside of sounds of women screaming the band's name). The wraparound studio scenes were filmed on Christmas Eve 1967, the final scenes ever shot for the series.
55	23	"Monkees Mind Their Manor"	Peter H. Thorkelson	Coslough Johnson	February 26, 1968
Davy inherits an English manor but doesn't want to live there for 5 years (a stipulation of the bequest); since he also doesn't want the manor sold to a land developer, the band puts on a medieval fair to raise funds for the local villagers to buy the property. Davy also must use lances, swords, and vocal cords in a tournament against Sir Twiggley Toppen Middle Bottom (Bernard Fox). Songs: "Greensleeves," "Star Collector" Note: No laugh track. Directed by Peter Tork (who is credited under his birth name). Jack Good, who portrays Lance Kibbie the Sot, would later produce the 1969 TV special 33 1/3 Revolutions Per Monkee.
56	24	"Some Like It Lukewarm" "The Band Contest"	James Frawley	Joel Kane and Stanley Z. Cherry	March 4, 1968
The Monkees enter a band contest (hosted by radio DJ Jerry Blavat) with a $500 cash prize, but when they learn the entrants must be mixed-gender groups, Davy is chosen to pose as a girl. "Miss Jones" soon falls in love with another entrant, Daphne, (Deana Martin), who's posing as a male in her band. Songs: "Last Train to Clarksville," "The Door Into Summer," "She Hangs Out" Note: No laugh track. Special guest appearance by Charlie Smalls, who appears with Davy in the end-of-episode tag segment.
57	25	"The Monkees Blow Their Minds"	David Winters	Peter Meyerson	March 11, 1968
The Monkees swing to the rescue when mentalist Oracullo (Monte Landis) gains control of Peter's mind to use him in a nightclub act. Songs: "Valleri" (1968 version), "Gonna Buy Me a Dog" (instrumental track), "Daily Nightly" Note: No laugh track. Final appearance of Mr. Schneider. Frequent Monkees director James Frawley appears as Oracullo's assistant, Rudy. Featuring cameos by Frank Zappa (who appears with Mike in the teaser) and Burgess Meredith (as the Penguin).
58	26	"The Frodis Caper" "Mijacogeo"	Micky Dolenz	Story by : Jon C. Andersen and Micky Dolenz; Teleplay by : Micky Dolenz and Dave Evans	March 25, 1968
After Peter and their neighbors are hypnotized through their TV sets, Micky, Mike, and Davy must match wits with the insane Wizard Glick (Rip Taylor), who is out to control the minds of television viewers worldwide. Songs: "Zor and Zam" (Original version), "Song to the Siren" (performed by Tim Buckley); Saturday mornings: "I Never Thought It Peculiar" replaced "Zor and Zam." Notes: No laugh track. Directed by Micky Dolenz. Special guest appearance by Tim Buckley in the end-of-episode tag segment. One of Wizard Glick's henchmen says that the Monkeemen monitor "Ain't been activated in 5 years", implying that the fictional Monkees have been together since at least 1963, and had battled Wizard Glick before. The alternative title, "Mijacogeo," comes from the name of Micky Dolenz' childhood pet dog, who was named after all the members of Micky's family at the time: Micky, Janelle (his mother), Coco (his sister) and George (his father).

== Unproduced episode ==
- "Monkees Toy Around" (written by Coslough Johnson; first draft: February 27, 1967)

== Movie ==
The Monkees also filmed a movie called Head that started production in early 1968, and was released in theaters that November by the Monkees' parent studio, Columbia, just after their TV show was canceled. Head was co-written by a then-largely-unknown Jack Nicholson. The film included six new songs, but was poorly promoted and not received very well by the public (as the film had a somewhat darker and more mature tone than the TV series) or contemporary critics; in the decades since, it has become a cult hit; some of the film's songs joined the Monkees' concert setlist.

== Later television episodes ==
The Monkees' television series was canceled after its second season. The group hoped to take the television show in different directions, e.g. recasting it as an hour-long variety show with comedy sketches and musical guests. However, NBC wanted the show to stay the same. Both parties decided to throw in the towel. After the series was canceled, NBC contracted with The Monkees to create and broadcast three longer television specials.

33⅓ Revolutions Per Monkee was the first of these longer television productions. It aired on NBC on April 14, 1969 (opposite ABC's live telecast of the 41st Academy Awards) to lower-than-expected ratings. The second two planned television specials were never produced. Peter Tork quit the group between the taping of 33⅓ Revolutions Per Monkee and its broadcast; Michael Nesmith left the group - buying out of his contract - in early 1970 to focus on his solo career, leaving the Monkees as a duo of Dolenz and Jones, under which one final original Monkees album under the 1966 Colgems contract, Changes, was released in June 1970.

The Monkees returned to broadcast television with Hey, Hey, It's the Monkees, a reunion special which was broadcast on ABC on February 17, 1997. The special was written and directed by Nesmith, emulating the style of the original NBC series; all four of the "real" Monkees do comedy and sing songs, some of which were new songs from the quartet's 1996 album Justus. This would be the last time Dolenz, Jones, Nesmith, and Tork would appear together on a television special, although Dolenz, Jones, and Tork made semi-frequent guest appearances on TV talk shows (such as The Tonight Show with Jay Leno, the Rosie O'Donnell Show and the Today show) for a few years afterwards. Jones died in 2012.

Nesmith, Dolenz and Tork continued to make occasional TV interview appearances in later years. The trio appeared together for a May 2016 interview with Anthony Mason of CBS News Sunday Morning, on the occasion of the group's 50th anniversary. Tork died in 2019; Nesmith died in 2021.

== Notes ==
- Episodes frequently finished short of the allotted thirty minutes; this led producer Rafelson to film candid backstage interviews with the boys that lasted one minute, and led to a frequent quip, "We're a minute short." For the episode "Find the Monkees", the epilogue interview (in which the Monkees discussed the then-recent Sunset Strip riots) lasted three minutes.
- During the series' original NBC run and during CBS Saturday-morning repeats, some episodes were updated with music from the band's current releases. The Monkees ceased releasing new records in 1970, but altered episodes continued on CBS until 1972.
- Many of the episodes, particularly those of the second season, are known by more than one title. This is largely due to the episodes not having their titles shown on screen; and rerun episodes sometimes billed with different titles from that given on the original showings. Occasionally, the early draft titles were confused with the final title; and slogans from promotional advertisements (such as those in TV Guide) may also be confused with the actual episode title.
- The use of a laugh track was officially dropped starting with the second-season episode "Hitting the High Seas", with the exception of "The Monkees Watch Their Feet" and "The Devil and Peter Tork", as they were produced before the practice went into effect.
- A majority of Season 2 episodes were leftover scripts from Season 1 and shot in the spring of 1967, shortly after the first season finished shooting. The rest of the season was shot in the fall of 1967, but episodes were not aired in the order in which they were filmed. This explains the difference in appearances for each of the Monkees, as well as the alteration in Mike Nesmith's voice (a result of throat surgery). An example of this: "The Monkees Blow Their Minds" as compared to "The Wild Monkees." The differences show up in "The Monkees in Paris" between the teaser and epilogue (featuring Micky with his hair curled up) and the bulk of the episode (where Micky's hair is combed). This is also evident between the storyline filming and the music portions of some episodes. In "It's a Nice Place to Visit", Micky's hair is combed back throughout the episode. However, when they play "What Am I Doing Hanging 'Round?", Micky's hair is curly. Plus, Mike spoke with a slightly husky, stronger voice in episodes such as "The Monkee's Paw" and "The Monkees in Paris," whereas he kept his pre-surgery voice in such episodes as "The Devil and Peter Tork" and "Art for Monkee's Sake."
- When the TV series was distributed and broadcast in syndication beginning in 1975, the opening credits sequence used for all 58 episodes was the sequence from the original Season 2. This package was also commonly shown in the United Kingdom and seen on MTV in the 1980s. Many modern viewers of the program never saw the Season 1 opening credits sequence, which is included in most newer DVD compilations, until the show began airing on MeTV in a remastered widescreen version in 2019.
