= Monkee Flips =

Compilation album by the Monkees
- Released: February 1984
- Recorded: July 1966–April 1970
- Genre: Rock
- Label: Rhino
- Producer: Various

The Monkees chronology
Monkee Business (1982)	Monkee Flips (1984)	Hit Factory (1985)

Monkee Flips is a compilation album of songs by the Monkees, issued by Rhino Records in 1984. Labeled as the "Best of the Monkees, Volume Four" (as it followed the two Arista Records compilations Greatest Hits (1976) and More Greatest Hits (1982) and the Rhino Records picture disc Monkee Business (1982), the album featured an all-stereo selection of single sides and album tracks, including several songs featured in the Monkees TV series. It was available on both LP record and cassette formats.

"Tear Drop City", "Good Clean Fun" and "Oh My My", all of which charted in the Billboard Top 100, make their American "greatest hits" debut with this package (the latter two had previously appeared on the 1979 Australian compilation Monkeemania (40 Timeless Hits)). Seven of the 14 tracks — "You Told Me", "I Love You Better", "Forget That Girl", "No Time", "Dream World", "Little Girl" and "Daily Nightly" — all make their first appearance on any Monkees "greatest hits" package here. The album is also notable for containing a previously unreleased alternate mix of "Circle Sky" with a different lead vocal from Michael Nesmith.

The LP was reissued in 1986 with a different mix of "Forget That Girl" featuring some opening studio chatter and a mono mix of "Love Is Only Sleeping". The sleeve and label are the same for both releases, with only an "RE-1" in the run-off groove of the vinyl denoting the update.

The album cover shows a still photograph of the Monkees (with Peter Tork playing banjo) from a filmed performance of "What Am I Doing Hangin' 'Round", featured in the second season episode of The Monkees entitled "A Nice Place to Visit".

The liner notes included a detailed recap of the Monkees' career, with then-recent interview comments from Nesmith and Dolenz.

Monkee Flips went out of print as Rhino shifted from vinyl releases to compact discs. Each of the tracks have since been reissued, digitally remastered, on various individual Monkees CDs.

== Track listing ==
Side 1

No.	Title	Source	Length
1.	"You Told Me" (Michael Nesmith)	From Headquarters
2.	"Tear Drop City" (Tommy Boyce / Bobby Hart)	Single A-side; from Instant Replay
3.	"I Love You Better" (Jeff Barry / Andy Kim)	B-side of "Oh My My"; from Changes
4.	"Forget That Girl" (Chip Douglas)	From Headquarters
5.	"Love Is Only Sleeping" (Barry Mann / Cynthia Weil)	From Pisces, Aquarius, Capricorn & Jones, Ltd.
6.	"Good Clean Fun" (Michael Nesmith)	Single A-side, from The Monkees Present
7.	"Zor and Zam" (Bill Chadwick / John Chadwick)	From The Birds, The Bees & The Monkees

Side 2

No.	Title	Source	Length
1.	"No Time" (Hank Cicalo)	From Headquarters
2.	"Oh My My" (Jeff Barry / Andy Kim)	Single A-side; from Changes
3.	"Dream World" (David Jones / Steve Pitts)	From The Birds, The Bees & The Monkees
4.	"Circle Sky" (Michael Nesmith)	Alternate mix with different vocal; original version from Head
5.	"Little Girl" (Micky Dolenz)	From The Monkees Present
6.	"Daily Nightly" (Michael Nesmith)	From Pisces, Aquarius, Capricorn & Jones, Ltd.
7.	"Gonna Buy Me a Dog" (Tommy Boyce / Bobby Hart)	From The Monkees
