= If I Knew =

If I Knew may refer to:

- "If I Knew", 1969 song by The Monkees, from their album, The Monkees Present
- "If I Knew", 2013 Bruno Mars song from his album Unorthodox Jukebox
