= Good Clean Fun (The Monkees song) =

- US single cover

Single by The Monkees

from the album The Monkees Present
- B-side: "Mommy and Daddy"
- Released: September 6, 1969
- Recorded: 1968
- Studio: RCA Studio B, Nashville, Tennessee
- Genre: Country rock
- Length: 2:19
- Label: Colgems #5005
- Songwriter: Michael Nesmith
- Producer: Michael Nesmith

The Monkees singles chronology
"Listen to the Band" (1969)	"Good Clean Fun" (1969)	"Oh My My" (1970)

"Good Clean Fun" is a song by The Monkees from their 1969 album The Monkees Present. Colgems released the song as a single on September 6, 1969. Written and sung by Michael Nesmith, the song's title is never heard in the lyrics.

== Background ==
Michael Nesmith described "Good Clean Fun" as "poetic license" and said the song was "a direct insult to a songwriter publisher who had told me that in order to have successful tunes I had to write music that was 'good clean fun' and that had a recurring theme or hookline. Of course I just rejected that out of hand. So that was: OK, I'll write a song called 'Good Clean Fun' - but I just won't put it in there anywhere." According to Andrew Sandoval, the song was "labeled on one tape box as 'Here I Am'".

== Recording ==
The backing track was recorded at RCA Studio B in Nashville, Tennessee on June 1, 1968. Additional instrumental overdubs were recorded the next day. On August 21, Nesmith mixed the completed song at RCA in Hollywood. The song was remixed for the single's release the following year.

== Release ==
"Good Clean Fun" was edited into the soundtrack of The Monkees episode "I Was A Teenage Monster" when the series aired in Saturday morning reruns.

The song was remixed in 1991 when it was included on the Listen to the Band box set.

== Chart performance ==
"Good Clean Fun" reached No. 82 on the Billboard Hot 100 and No. 29 on the Easy Listening chart. In Canada it reached No. 80 Sandoval wrote that the single was "a difficult song to sell, considering it does not feature the title anywhere in the lyrics and is a hardcore country & western number". The flip-side, "Mommy and Daddy", is sung by its writer Micky Dolenz.

== Personnel ==
Credits adapted from Rhino Handmade 2013 "Deluxe Edition" box set.

The Monkees

- Michael Nesmith - lead vocals

Additional musicians

- Lloyd Green – steel guitar
- Wayne Moss – guitar
- Bobby Thompson – banjo
- David Briggs – piano
- Norbert Putnam – bass guitar
- Jerry Carrigan – drums
- Buddy Spicher - violin

Unconfirmed personnel and duties

- Harold Bradley or Billy Sanford – additional guitar
- Percussion
