= Oh My My (The Monkees song) =

- US single cover

Single by the Monkees

from the album Changes
- B-side: "I Love You Better"
- Released: April 1, 1970
- Recorded: February 5, 1970
- Studio: RCA, New York City, NY
- Genre: Bubblegum pop
- Length: 2:57
- Label: Colgems
- Songwriters: Jeff Barry; Andy Kim
- Producer: Jeff Barry

The Monkees singles chronology
"Good Clean Fun" (1969)	"Oh My My" (1970)	"Do It in the Name of Love" (1971)

Official audio
- "Oh My My" on YouTube

"Oh My My" is a 1970 song written by Jeff Barry and Andy Kim and performed by The Monkees. The single reached number 98 on the Billboard Hot 100 chart. The single was their last entry on the charts until 1986.

== Background ==
In early 1970, Michael Nesmith left the Monkees to pursue a solo career, although he briefly continued to appear in advertising with the group due to contractual obligations. The group became a duo consisting of Micky Dolenz and Davy Jones. On February 5, 1970, Jeff Barry produced the backing track for "Oh My My" at RCA's studios in New York City alongside the backing tracks for the song's B-side, "I Love You Better", and "Tell Me Love", all of which would appear on the Monkees' album Changes. Vocals were added at a later date.

== Release ==
"Oh My My" was released as a single in April or May 1970 by Colgems. The song appeared as the opening track of Changes when it was released in June. On June 13, Dolenz and Jones appeared on the music series Upbeat to promote the single.

A promo film was created for the song, showing Dolenz and Jones "on horses and motorcycles". In 2016, the clip was released as a bonus feature on The Monkees: The Complete Series Blu-ray boxset.

"Oh My My" was edited into the soundtracks of The Monkees episodes "Monkees A La Mode" and "Hitting the High Seas" when they were rerun on Saturday mornings.

== Critical reception ==
In a retrospective review, Matthew Greenwald of AllMusic described the song as a "somewhat funky and overall pale example of pop bubblegum." In the book The Monkees, Head, and the 60s, Peter Mills wrote that the song "possessed a sensual menace and a slowly funky feel, showing the ghost hadn't quite been given up."

== Personnel ==
Per Andrew Sandoval. Musician credits are unknown.

The Monkees

- Micky Dolenz - lead vocals

== Chart performance ==
Chart performance for "Oh My My"
Chart (1970)	Peak position
US Billboard Hot 100	98
US Cashbox Top 100	94
