= Do It in the Name of Love =

1971 song by The Monkees

Single by The Monkees
- B-side: "Lady Jane"
- Released: April 1971
- Recorded: September 22, 1970
- Genre: Bubblegum pop
- Length: 2:04
- Label: Bell
- Songwriters: Bobby Bloom; Neil Goldberg
- Producer: Jeff Barry

The Monkees singles chronology
"Oh My My" (1970)	"Do It in the Name of Love" (1971)	"Christmas Is My Time of Year" (1976)

"Do It in the Name of Love" is a song written by Bobby Bloom and Neil Brian Goldberg.

== The Monkees ==
Producer Jeff Barry tapped Bloom and Goldberg to write songs for what would be the Monkees' final album for Colgems Records. Barry had recently produced songs for The Archies with both songwriters. Following the release of Changes in May 1970, their collaboration with the Monkees continued for a final single. The remaining Monkees, Micky Dolenz and Davy Jones, recorded "Do It in the Name of Love" and its B-side "Lady Jane" during a single session on 22 September 1970. (Peter Tork and Michael Nesmith both left the group in a musical capacity before recording sessions for Changes began.) Both sides were produced and arranged by Jeff Barry and written by Bloom and Goldberg.

Before the single could be released, Colgems Records folded and its catalogue was transferred to Bell Records. Bell decided to release the single on its label, crediting "Mickey Dolenz & Davy Jones" as the artists, with the misspelling of Micky Dolenz's name going unnoticed at the time. The single was also released in Japan, where it had a picture sleeve and was credited to "The Monkees".

"Do It in the Name of Love" failed to chart, and the Monkees officially disbanded.

The song first re-emerged in 1981 in Japan, where the Monkees were having a resurgence in popularity. The reissued single from Arista Records managed to crack #93 on Japan's Oricon Singles Chart. It first reappeared in the United States on the Monkees' Rhino box set Listen to the Band in 1991. It also appeared on the 2001 box set Music Box. Both sides of the single were bonus tracks on the 1994 CD reissue of Changes and the Classic Album Collection from 2016.

== Candi Staton ==
"Do It in the Name of Love"

Single by Candi Staton

from the album Candi Staton
- B-side: "The Thanks I Get for Loving You"
- Released: December 1972
- Length: 3:00
- Label: FAME
- Songwriters: B. Bloom; N. Goldberg
- Producer: Rick Hall

Candi Staton singles chronology
"Lovin' You, Lovin' Me" (1972)	"Do It in the Name of Love" (1972)	"Something's Burning" (1973)

Neil Goldberg submitted "Do It in the Name of Love" to FAME Studios producer Rick Hall, who selected the song for soul artist Candi Staton.

Staton's recording became the lead track on her 1972 album Candi Staton, and was issued as a single in December of that year backed with her own composition "The Thanks I Get for Loving You". Her version of the song peaked at #63 on the Billboard Hot 100 and at #17 on the R&B charts.

"Do It in the Name of Love" appeared on the 1973 compilation Soul Train Hits That Made It Happen and a 2006 German CD Top 20 Greatest Hits. A 2004 collection by British label Honest Jon's included the B-side "The Thanks I Get for Loving You". Both sides were collected on a 1994 French CD The Ultimate Fame Years Collection and again in 2011 in a more complete UK collection on the Kent Soul label titled Evidence: The Complete Fame Records Masters.

== Other versions ==
Soul singer Betty Padgett's 1988 album Sweet Feeling on Pip Records included several Candi Staton covers, including "Do It in the Name of Love".
