= More Greatest Hits =

More Greatest Hits may refer to:

- More Greatest Hits (Connie Francis album)
- More Greatest Hits of The Monkees

== See also ==
- More Hits by The Supremes, 1965
