= Monkee Business =

Compilation album by the Monkees
- Released: 1982 (original); 1986 (reissue)
- Recorded: 1966–1969
- Genre: Rock
- Label: Rhino
- Producer: Various

The Monkees chronology
More Greatest Hits of The Monkees (1976)	Monkee Business (1982)	Monkee Flips (1984)

Monkee Business is a compilation album of songs by the Monkees, issued by Rhino Records in 1982. It was the first American Monkees rarities collection and was released on both LP and cassette formats, with the LP being a picture disc.

Monkee Business marked the U.S. LP debut of several non-album tracks which had only been released as singles or B-sides: "Goin' Down," "D.W. Washburn", "It's Nice to Be with You," "Someday Man" and "Tema Dei Monkees," the Italian version of "(Theme From) The Monkees." Additionally, "Steam Engine" and "Love to Love" had been previously unreleased until the 1979 Australian compilation album Monkeemania (40 Timeless Hits). As a picture disc, the playback quality of Monkee Business was inferior to standard vinyl of the early 1980s.

The album was reissued in 1986 with a recompiled track listing from different sources, which resulted in several mixing variations. This second pressing is notable for including studio chatter at the beginning of "Someday Man" that had not been heard on the 1982 edition. The 1986 edition can be identified by "RE-1" appearing in the LP's inner groove.

Monkee Business went out of print as Rhino shifted from vinyl releases to compact discs. Each of the tracks have since been reissued, digitally remastered, on various individual Monkees CDs, as part of the Missing Links collections or as bonus tracks on concurrent Monkees albums.

In fall of 1986 Rhino put out a New Release sheet advertising the title "The Rest Of The Monkees" with a catalog number and track listing.

The photo of the band used on the cover is a reversed image from the original.

== Track listing ==
=== Original 1982 LP ===
Side 1

No.	Title	Notes	Length
1.	"Porpoise Song" (Gerry Goffin / Carole King)	1968 mono mix. Single version; from Head. Sourced from vinyl.	4:04
2.	"Star Collector" (Gerry Goffin / Carole King)	Reversed channels mix. From Pisces, Aquarius, Capricorn & Jones, Ltd..	3:30
3.	"It's Nice to Be With You" (Jerry Goldstein)	1968 mono mix. B-side of "D.W. Washburn".	2:47
4.	"D.W. Washburn" (Jerry Leiber / Mike Stoller)	Single A-side.	2:47
5.	"Steam Engine" (Chip Douglas)	Previously unreleased in the U.S. 1969 mono TV mix.	2:21
6.	"Tema Dei Monkees" (Tommy Boyce / Bobby Hart / Nistri)	1967 mono mix. Italian single A-side.	2:30

Side 2

No.	Title	Notes	Length
1.	"Pleasant Valley Sunday" (Gerry Goffin / Carole King)	1967 mono mix. Single version; from Pisces, Aquarius, Capricorn & Jones. Ltd..	3:12
2.	"What Am I Doing Hangin' Round" (Michael Martin Murphey / Owens Castleman)	Reversed channels mix; from Pisces, Aquarius, Capricorn & Jones. Ltd..	3:02
3.	"She Hangs Out" (Ellie Greenwich / Jeff Barry)	1967 mono mix. Withdrawn Canadian single version. Sourced from vinyl.	2:33
4.	"Love to Love" (Neil Diamond)	Previously unreleased in the U.S.. 1969 mono mix.	2:35
5.	"Someday Man" (Paul Williams / Roger Nichols)	B-side of "Listen to the Band".	2:38
6.	"Goin' Down" (The Monkees / Diane Hildebrand)	1967 alternate mono mix. B-side of "Daydream Believer".	4:23

=== 1986 reissue LP ===
Side 1

No.	Title	Notes	Length
1.	"Porpoise Song (Theme from Head)" (Gerry Goffin / Carole King)	Single version; from Head	4:04
2.	"Star Collector" (Gerry Goffin / Carole King)	1967 alternate stereo mix; from Pisces, Aquarius, Capricorn & Jones, Ltd..	3:30
3.	"It's Nice to Be With You" (Jerry Goldstein)	1968 mono mix. B-side of "D.W. Washburn".	2:47
4.	"D.W. Washburn" (Jerry Leiber / Mike Stoller)	Single A-side.	2:47
5.	"Steam Engine" (Chip Douglas)	Previously unreleased in the U.S.. 1969 alternate mono mix.	2:21
6.	"Tema Dei Monkees" (Tommy Boyce/ Bobby Hart / Nistri)	1967 mono mix. Italian single A-side. Early fadeout.	2:16

Side 2

No.	Title	Notes	Length
1.	"Pleasant Valley Sunday" (Gerry Goffin / Carole King)	1967 mono mix. Single version; from Pisces, Aquarius, Capricorn & Jones. Ltd..	3:12
2.	"What Am I Doing Hangin' Round" (Michael Martin Murphey / Owens Castleman)	Reversed channels mix; from Pisces, Aquarius, Capricorn & Jones. Ltd..	3:02
3.	"She Hangs Out" (Ellie Greenwich / Jeff Barry)	1967 mono mix. Withdrawn Canadian single version.	2:33
4.	"Love to Love" (Neil Diamond)	Previously unreleased in the U.S.. 1969 mono mix.	2:35
5.	"Someday Man" (Paul Williams / Roger Nichols)	1969 mono mix with studio chatter. B-side of "Listen to the Band".	2:38
6.	"Goin' Down" (The Monkees / Diane Hildebrand)	B-side of "Daydream Believer".	4:24
