= Changes (The Monkees album) =

Studio album by the Monkees
- Released: June 30, 1970
- Recorded: October 28, 1966; January 21–24, February 4–6, 1967; July 16–September 12, 1969; February 5–April 2, 1970
- Studios: RCA Victor, B (New York City); RCA Victor (Hollywood); The Sound Factory (Hollywood)
- Genres: Pop rock; bubblegum
- Length: 32:05
- Label: Colgems
- Producers: Jeff Barry, Micky Dolenz, Tommy Boyce, Bobby Hart

The Monkees chronology
The Monkees Present (1969)	Changes (1970)	Barrel Full of Monkees (1971)

Singles from Changes
- 1. "Oh My My" / "I Love You Better" Released: April 1970

Professional ratings
Review scores
Source	Rating
AllMusic	3/5 stars

Changes is the ninth studio album by the American pop rock band the Monkees, released in 1970 by Colgems Records. The album was issued after Michael Nesmith's exit from the band, leaving only Micky Dolenz and Davy Jones to fulfill the recording contract they had signed in the mid-1960s. Changes was their last new album for Colgems Records and the group's last album of all new material until Pool It!, released in 1987.

== History ==
The album's title had originally been considered for the Monkees' movie (released in 1968), and a song with that title (co-written by Davy Jones with Steve Pitts) had been recorded. The movie was retitled Head, however, and the song was subsequently shelved, remaining unreleased until 1990, when it appeared on the archival compilation album Missing Links Volume Two.

Changes reunited Jones and Micky Dolenz with producer Jeff Barry, who now had his own successful record label, Steed Records. As with the earliest Monkees recordings, Jones and Dolenz provided only their vocals, despite the album cover featuring them playing percussion, while the backing tracks were provided by session musicians. Several of the songs selected for the album were outtakes from previous album sessions: Barry resurrected his own produced outtake of his song "99 Pounds" from the final Don Kirshner-supervised Monkees sessions in January 1967 that also yielded the hit single "A Little Bit Me, A Little Bit You"; Micky's "Midnight Train" was recorded during sessions for The Monkees Present and had been featured in CBS-TV reruns of The Monkees television show (most notably in "The Chaperone"); "I Never Thought It Peculiar," with vocals by Jones, was written by frequent Monkees collaborators Tommy Boyce and Bobby Hart and was recorded during the sessions for More of the Monkees (1967).

Jones later stated that Changes was his least favorite Monkees effort, going so far as to comment in the 1994 Rhino Records CD version's liner notes that the album "was Jeff Barry and Andy Kim doing an Andy Kim album," adding that he had terrible memories of the recording sessions. Dolenz, while not lavishing praise on Changes, said that he was pleased to be invited to record new material. "I was quite happy to do it as long as somebody wanted to record me. It was simple as that." Dolenz added, "By that time, it was pretty obvious that the Monkees were over. Davy and I were still getting along, but we were mainly fulfilling a contractual obligation to a record company — that's what Changes is all about".

== Release ==
"Oh My My" became the first single from the album and made the Top 100 in the Billboard charts. Written by Barry and Kim, it is unrelated to the later 1973 Ringo Starr single of the same name. In addition to being the album's opening track and lead-off single, "Oh My My" was also accompanied by a rare promo film directed by Dolenz, showing him and Jones riding their motorcycles and horses.

Changes appeared in June 1970 and initially failed to make the charts. Consequently, its initial pressing (COS-119) was limited and has become one of the more valuable Monkees albums. Jones announced shortly after its release that he was resuming his solo career, but he and Dolenz would release one more single together before reuniting with Boyce and Hart in 1976 as Dolenz, Jones, Boyce & Hart. In the wake of the success of the Monkees' television show being rebroadcast on Saturday mornings by CBS (in which all but two tracks from Changes were featured in the reruns), the duo recorded "Do It in the Name of Love" and "Lady Jane" in September 1970. Instead of appearing under the "Monkees" name on Colgems Records, however, the single was released on Bell Records, the successor label to Colgems, and was credited to "Mickey Dolenz [sic] and Davy Jones". This was due to the prohibitive costs of licensing the Monkees name in the US; however, in Japan, the record was issued under the name "the Monkees".

Like all of the original Monkees albums from 1966 to 1970, Changes was reissued in September 1986 by Rhino Records (RNLP-70148) and made a belated entry into the Billboard album charts, reaching No. 152. The Rhino vinyl reissue was transferred from a vinyl copy of the album, the master tape having been lost over the years. For the 1994 CD reissue on Rhino, a first-generation master tape was used, which had been found at the Screen Gems publishing division.

== Session outtakes ==
"Shake 'Em Up", a 1968 outtake from the sessions for The Birds, the Bees & the Monkees, written by Jerry Leiber and Mike Stoller and sung by Dolenz, was offered up for consideration to be included on Changes but was ultimately rejected by Barry in favor of new material. It was first issued in 1996 on another Monkees rarities collection, Missing Links Volume Three.

"Time and Time Again", a track written by Jones and Bill Chadwick and recorded in 1969, was originally slated to be on the album but was ultimately not chosen. The track later surfaced on the 1987 Monkees rarities collection Missing Links and again in remixed form as a bonus track on the 1994 CD release of Changes.

Another song, "Steam Engine", was recorded in 1969 and was written and produced by Chip Douglas, featuring Dolenz on vocals. The song was not released at the time, due to a disagreement between Screen Gems and Douglas over session costs, and only saw the light of day via a Saturday morning rerun of the Monkees' TV series episode "Monkees on Tour". In 1979, it was finally issued on the semi-official Australian compilation album Monkeemania (40 Timeless Hits), and in 1982 it was issued in the USA on the Rhino picture disc compilation Monkee Business.

Two known outtakes from the sessions—"Ride Baby Ride" and "Which Way Do You Want It?"—were thought to be lost as of the release of the 1994 Rhino CD. On February 17, 2023, the latter was unveiled during the "Jeff Barry & The Monkees" event in Los Angeles, featuring Barry in conversation with Monkees historian Andrew Sandoval and broadcast online over Zoom.

On April 7, 1970, a finished album master was compiled that closed with the songs "Which Way Do You Want It?" and "Time and Time Again", although these songs were replaced with "Midnight Train" and "I Never Thought It Peculiar" for unknown reasons on April 29.

== Track listing ==
Side one
No.	Title	Lead vocals	Length
1.	"Oh My My" (Jeff Barry, Andy Kim)	Micky Dolenz	3:02
2.	"Ticket on a Ferry Ride" (Barry, Bobby Bloom)	Dolenz	3:30
3.	"You're So Good to Me" (Barry, Bloom)	Davy Jones	2:34
4.	"It's Got to Be Love" (Neil Brian Goldberg)	Dolenz	2:25
5.	"Acapulco Sun" (Ned Albright, Steven Soles)	Dolenz	2:54
6.	"99 Pounds" (Barry)	Jones	2:29

Side two
No.	Title	Lead vocals	Length
1.	"Tell Me Love" (Barry)	Dolenz	2:38
2.	"Do You Feel It Too?" (Barry, Kim)	Jones	2:37
3.	"I Love You Better" (Barry, Kim)	Dolenz	2:28
4.	"All Alone in the Dark" (Albright, Soles)	Dolenz	2:52
5.	"Midnight Train" (Dolenz)	Dolenz	2:07
6.	"I Never Thought It Peculiar" (Tommy Boyce, Bobby Hart)	Jones	2:29

1994 CD bonus tracks
No.	Title	Lead vocals	Length
13.	"Time and Time Again" (Jones, Bill Chadwick)	Jones	2:40
14.	"Do It in the Name of Love" (Bloom, Goldberg)	Jones, Dolenz	2:08
15.	"Lady Jane" (Bloom, Goldberg)	Jones, Dolenz	2:45

- While Jeff Barry and Bobby Bloom are officially credited as writers of "You're So Good to Me", AllMusic incorrectly credits Robert Stone as a co-writer of the track.
- While Micky Dolenz is officially credited as the writer of "Midnight Train", AllMusic incorrectly credits Chris McCarty, Kenny Lee Lewis and Steve Miller as co-writers of the track.

== Personnel ==
Credits adapted from The Monkees: The Day-by-Day Story by Andrew Sandoval.

The Monkees

- Micky Dolenz – vocals
- Davy Jones – vocals

Additional musicians

Confirmed credits for tracks 6, 11 and 12, all outtakes from previous album sessions:

- Al Gorgoni – guitar (6)
- Don Thomas – guitar (6)
- Hugh McCracken – guitar (6)
- Lou Mauro – bass guitar (6)
- Artie Butler – organ (6)
- Stan Free – clavinet (6)
- Herb Lovelle – drums (6)
- Tom Cerone – tambourine (6)
- Louie Shelton – electric guitar (11–12)
- James Burton – banjo (11)
- Tommy Morgan – harmonica (11)
- Joe Osborn – bass guitar (11)
- Hal Blaine – drums (11)
- Coco Dolenz – backing vocals (11)
- Wayne Erwin – guitar (12)
- Gerry McGee – guitar (12)
- Tommy Boyce – acoustic guitar, backing vocals (12)
- Larry Taylor – bass guitar (12)
- Billy Lewis – drums (12)
- Gene Estes – bells (12)
- Bobby Hart – backing vocals (12)
- Ron Hicklin – backing vocals (12)
- Jay Migliori – saxophone (12)
- Dick Hyde – trombone (12)
- Chuck Findley – trumpet (12)
- Alan Robinson – French horn (12)
- Harold Ayres – violin (12)
- Joy Lule – violin (12)
- John DeVoogdt – violin (12)
- Norman Serkin – violin (12)
- Jimmy Getzoff – violin (12)
- Frederick Seykora – cello (12)
- William Hymanson – viola (12)
- Gareth Nuttycombe – viola (12)
- Michael Anthony – unknown (12)

Changes songwriter and guitarist Steven Soles cited the following musicians as having performed on the 1970 sessions, although they are not listed in The Monkees: The Day-by-Day Story:

- Bobby Bloom – unknown
- Steven Soles – guitar
- Jeff Barry – unknown
- Ned Albright – keyboards, unknown
- Ron Frangipane – keyboards
- Hugh McCracken – guitar, unknown
- Gary Chester – drums
- Buddy Saltzman – drums
- Chuck Rainey – bass guitar

Other unknown personnel:

- Engineer (6)
- Backing vocals, handclaps (6)

Technical

Credits adapted from CD liner notes, except where noted.

- Jeff Barry – producer, arranger (1–10)
- Mike Moran – engineer (1–5, 7–10)
- Ray Hall – engineer (6)
- Micky Dolenz – producer (11)
- Pete Abbott – engineer (11)
- Tommy Boyce – producer (12)
- Bobby Hart – producer (12)
- Jimmie Haskell – arranger (12)
- Dave Hassinger – overdubs engineer (12)
- Brendan Cahill – music co-ordinator
- Rickyflicks – cover photo

== Charts ==
Chart (1986)	Peak position
US Billboard Top Pop Albums	152

== Bibliography ==
- Sandoval, Andrew (2021). The Monkees: The Day-by-Day Story (2nd ed.). Beatland Books. ISBN 978-0-578-88087-7.
