= Hey, Hey, It's the Monkees =

- Written by: Michael Nesmith
- Directed by: Michael Nesmith
- Starring: Micky Dolenz; Davy Jones; Michael Nesmith; Peter Tork
- Composer: Misha Segal
- Country of origin: United States
- Original language: English

Production
- Producer: Ronnie Hadar
- Cinematography: James Mathers
- Editor: Terry Chiappe
- Running time: 60

Original release
- Network: ABC
- Release: February 17, 1997

Related
- 33⅓ Revolutions Per Monkee

Hey, Hey, It's the Monkees is a one-hour comedy special broadcast on the ABC Network on Monday February 17, 1997. The program features all four of the original Monkees and was the last time Micky Dolenz, Davy Jones, Michael Nesmith, and Peter Tork appeared together in a new television show. The program was written and directed by Mike Nesmith.

This special is not to be confused with the similarly titled documentary from 1997, Hey, Hey, We're the Monkees.

== Overview ==
Based on the conceit that the group had never stopped filming episodes of their television series (despite having no place to air them since the series was cancelled), the special shows the now-middle-aged Monkees trying to come up with a new plot (apparently they have all been done by now) while still trying to catch their big break. Much of the music featured in the special came from the quartet's 1996 album Justus, along with a medley of their hits from the 1960s. As of November 2023, it has not been made available on DVD or Blu-ray.

Game show host Chuck Woolery makes a cameo.

== Plot ==
While Davy tries to get the band to rehearse for a very important gig, Micky seeks to find a gimmick to give them an identity, and Mike debates the necessity for anything other than just hanging out together. Various potential story lines present themselves, but each time the Monkees are quick to point out that they have already used that plot line in a previous episode and do not want to do it again.

Several musical sequences and comedy sketches are included.

== Development ==
The project began when ABC approached Monkees manager Ward Sylvester in November, 1996 about producing a Monkees retrospective. Sylvester countered with the idea of doing a special in the format of an episode from the original series. Post production delays caused the final print to be delivered too late for advanced screening, but the marketing push included ads run during some of ABC's most popular shows at the time.

== Reception ==
The show ranked at 73 for its week, with 10 million viewers.
