= The Monkees (TV series) =

American musical sitcom (1966–1968)

- Season One title card
- Genre: Sitcom; Musical
- Created by: Bob Rafelson; Bert Schneider
- Developed by: Paul Mazursky; Larry Tucker
- Starring: David Jones; Micky Dolenz; Michael Nesmith; Peter Tork
- Theme music composer: Tommy Boyce; Bobby Hart
- Opening theme: "(Theme From) The Monkees"
- Ending theme: "For Pete's Sake" (season 2)
- Composer: Stu Phillips (score)
- Country of origin: United States
- Original language: English
- No. of seasons: 2
- No. of episodes: 58 (list of episodes)

Production
- Executive producers: Bob Rafelson; Bert Schneider
- Producers: Bob Rafelson; Bert Schneider; Ward Sylvester (season 2)
- Cinematography: Irving Lippman; Richard H. Kline
- Editor: Mike Pozen (and others)
- Camera setup: Single-camera
- Running time: 25 minutes
- Production companies: Raybert Productions; Screen Gems

Original release
- Network: NBC
- Release: September 12, 1966 – March 25, 1968

Related
- Head; 33⅓ Revolutions per Monkee; Hey, Hey, It's the Monkees; New Monkees

The Monkees is an American television musical sitcom that first aired on NBC for two seasons, from September 12, 1966, to March 25, 1968. The series follows the adventures of four young men (The Monkees) trying to make a name for themselves as a rock 'n roll band. The show introduced a number of innovative new-wave film techniques to series television and won two Emmy Awards in 1967, including Outstanding Comedy Series. The program ended in 1968 at the finish of its second season and has received a long afterlife through Saturday morning repeats (CBS from 1969 to 1972 and ABC from 1972 to 1973) and syndication, as well as overseas broadcasts.

It later enjoyed a 1980s revival, after MTV aired reruns of the program in 1986. It aired on Sunday afternoons on MeTV beginning on February 24, 2019, three days after the death of cast member Peter Tork, and ending on April 26, 2020. The network aired four episodes on December 12, 2021, as a tribute to Michael Nesmith, who died two days earlier, followed by a 'Weekend Binge' on December 11 and 12.

== Overview ==
Season	Episodes	Originally released	
Season	Episodes	First released	Last released
1	32	September 12, 1966	April 24, 1967
2	26	September 11, 1967	March 25, 1968

The series centered on the adventures of the Monkees, a struggling rock band from Los Angeles, California consisting of Micky, Davy, Michael, and Peter. The comic elements of the storyline were provided by the strange and often surreal encounters that the band would have while searching for their big break.

== Production ==
=== Conception and casting ===
In the early 1960s, aspiring filmmakers Bob Rafelson and Bert Schneider had formed Raybert Productions and were trying to get a foot in the door in Hollywood. They were inspired by the Beatles' film A Hard Day's Night and decided to develop a television series about a fictional rock and roll group. Raybert sold the series idea to Screen Gems in April 1965, and Paul Mazursky and Larry Tucker completed a pilot script by August entitled "The Monkeys". Rafelson has said that he had the idea for a TV series about a music group as early as 1960, but had a hard time interesting anyone in it until 1965, by which time rock and roll music was firmly entrenched in pop culture.

On September 8, 1965, the show business trade publications Daily Variety and The Hollywood Reporter ran an ad seeking "Folk & Roll Musicians-Singers for acting roles in new TV series." As many as 400 hopefuls showed up to be considered as one of "4 insane boys". Fourteen actors from the audition pool were brought back for screen tests and Raybert chose their final four after audience research.

Micky Dolenz, son of screen actor George Dolenz, had prior screen experience under the name "Mickey Braddock" as the 10-year-old star of the Circus Boy series in the 1950s. He was actively auditioning for pilots at the time and was told about the Raybert project by his agent.

Englishman Davy Jones was a former jockey who had achieved some initial success on the musical stage, appearing with the cast of Oliver! on The Ed Sullivan Show the night of the Beatles' live American debut. He was appearing in Columbia Pictures productions and recording for the Colpix record label and had been identified in advance as a potential star for the series.

Born in Texas, Michael Nesmith's mother Bette Nesmith Graham had invented a correction fluid and founded the company that became Liquid Paper. Nesmith had served a brief stint in the U.S. Air Force and had recorded a few singles for Colpix under the name "Michael Blessing". He was the only one of The four Monkees who came to the audition after actually seeing the trade magazine ad. He arrived at the audition with a bag of laundry and impressed Rafelson and Schneider with his laid-back style and droll sense of humor. He also wore a green woollen hat to keep his hair out of his eyes while riding his motorcycle, leading to early promotional materials which nicknamed him "Wool Hat". The hat remained part of Nesmith's wardrobe throughout the series but the nickname was dropped after the pilot.

Peter Tork had accompanied his friend Stephen Stills to his audition and was recommended to Rafelson and Schneider by Stills. Tork was an experienced multi-instrumentalist who had performed at various folk clubs in Greenwich Village before moving to California, where he was working as a busboy.

=== Development ===
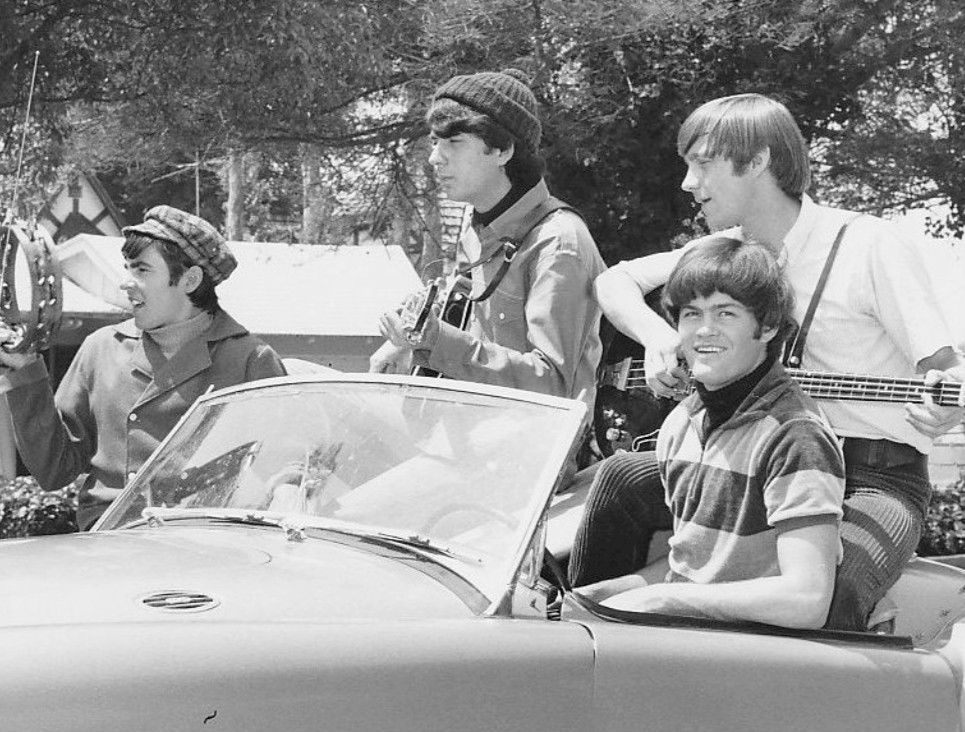
The Monkees in the spring of 1966, shortly after production for the first season had begun

Rafelson and Schneider wanted the style of the series to reflect avant garde film techniques — such as improvisation, quick cuts, jump cuts, breaking the fourth wall, and free-flowing, loose narratives — then being pioneered by European film directors. Each episode would contain at least one musical "romp" which might have nothing to do with the storyline. In retrospect, these vignettes now look very much like music videos: short, self-contained films of songs whose style echoed the Beatles' recent ventures into promotional films for their singles. Rafelson and Schneider also believed strongly in the program's ability to appeal to young people, intentionally framing the kids as heroes and the adults as heavies.

Rafelson and Schneider hired novice director James Frawley to teach the four actors improvisational comedy. Each of the four was given a different personality to portray: Dolenz the funny one, Nesmith the smart and serious one, Tork the naive one, and Jones the cute one. Their characters were loosely based on their real selves, with the exception of Tork, who was actually a quiet intellectual. The character types also had much in common with the respective personalities of the Beatles, with Dolenz representing the madcap attitude of John Lennon, Nesmith affecting the deadpan seriousness of George Harrison, Tork depicting the odd-man-out quality of Ringo Starr, and Jones conveying the pin-up appeal of Paul McCartney.

A pilot episode was shot in San Diego and Los Angeles on a shoestring budget — in many scenes, the Monkees wore their own clothes. Initial audience tests (which were just then being pioneered) produced very low responses. Rafelson then re-edited the pilot and included some of the screen tests to better introduce the band members to viewers. (Dolenz was credited in this pilot as "Micky Braddock".) The re-cut pilot tested so well that NBC placed an order for two seasons of episodes (the edited pilot was broadcast November 14, 1966, as the tenth episode of the first season, with Dolenz credited under his real last name, as for all other episodes).

=== Filming ===
The Monkees debuted September 12, 1966, on the NBC television network. The series was sponsored on alternate weeks by Kellogg's Cereals and Yardley of London.

According to a January 1967 Daily Variety article published during production of the first season, each episode cost $75,000 to produce. The individual members of The Monkees were paid $400 a week.

The series was filmed by Screen Gems, and many of the same sets and props from The Three Stooges short films made by the studio were used on The Monkees: A pair of pajamas with a bunny design on the front that had been worn by Curly Howard in shorts such as Cactus Makes Perfect and In the Sweet Pie and Pie were the same ones worn by Peter Tork in various episodes, such as "A Coffin Too Frequent" and "Monkee See, Monkee Die".

Unlike most television shows of the time, The Monkees episodes were written with many setups, requiring frequent breaks to prepare the set and cameras for short bursts of filming. Some of the "bursts" are considered proto-music videos, inasmuch as they were produced to sell the records. The Monkees Tale author Eric Lefcowitz noted that the Monkees were—first and foremost—a video group.

Due to the young men routinely wandering off set and being hard to find when needed for filming, any of the four Monkees who were not needed in front of the cameras were sequestered in a repurposed meat locker. In the DVD commentary, Tork noted that this had the added benefit of concealing any marijuana use that might be going on, although he admitted that he was the sole "serious 'head'" of the four of them (in the 1980s, Tork gave up alcohol and marijuana use and volunteered time to help people recovering from alcoholism). In a studio outtake included in the 1990s re-release of Headquarters, Nesmith quips, before launching into "Nine Times Blue": "Only difference between me and Peter is I'm just stone legal."

Due to the loosely scripted nature of the series, some episodes would come in too short for air. The producers decided to fill time with various "extras", including the Monkees' original screen tests and candid interviews with the group (conducted by Rafelson off-camera); these interviews usually lasted one minute, hence the frequent joke, "We're a minute short as usual," though the episode "Find the Monkees" featured a three-minute epilogue interview (in which the Monkees gave their opinions on the then-recently occurred Sunset Strip curfew riots). Although the early episodes contained a laugh track, which was standard practice at the time, the show eventually did not add one and half of the episodes from Season 2 had no canned laughter.

=== Music ===
The theme song to The Monkees, "(Theme From) The Monkees" (released as a single in some countries in 1967), is one of the group's most well-known songs. The line "We're the young generation and we've got somethin' to say" reflected the new youth counterculture and their desire to give their own opinions on world events and choosing how to live their own lives instead of abiding by the traditions and beliefs of their elders.

For the second season, the show used a version of the song "For Pete's Sake" as the closing theme, which appeared on the Monkees' album Headquarters.

== The Monkees' "pad" ==
The Monkees resided in a two-story beach house. The address 1334 North Beechwood Drive, Hollywood, California, was frequently given in 16 magazine as an address to contact Screen Gems and/or The Monkees. The front of the first floor was a combination of the living room, dining room and kitchen. In the back, overlooking the Pacific Ocean, was an alcove formed by massive floor-to-ceiling bay windows, where the Monkees kept their instruments and rehearsed songs. The walls were covered with various kitschy signs and posters. There were also two doors in the kitchen area; one led to a bathroom, the other to Davy and Peter's bedroom. The second floor (via spiral staircase near the front door) only consisted of Micky and Mike's bedroom. By the second season, the upstairs bedroom was occupied by all four Monkees. Also "residing" with the Monkees was Mr. Schneider, a mannequin who dispensed philosophical advice with the pull of his cord. Mr. Schneider was named after the show's co-producer Bert Schneider and was mostly voiced by main director James Frawley. During Season One, the boys also had to contend with their bad-tempered landlord Mr. Babbit, who was always yelling at them about various infractions that he thought they were responsible for or threatening to throw them out for not paying their rent.

== Monkeemobile ==
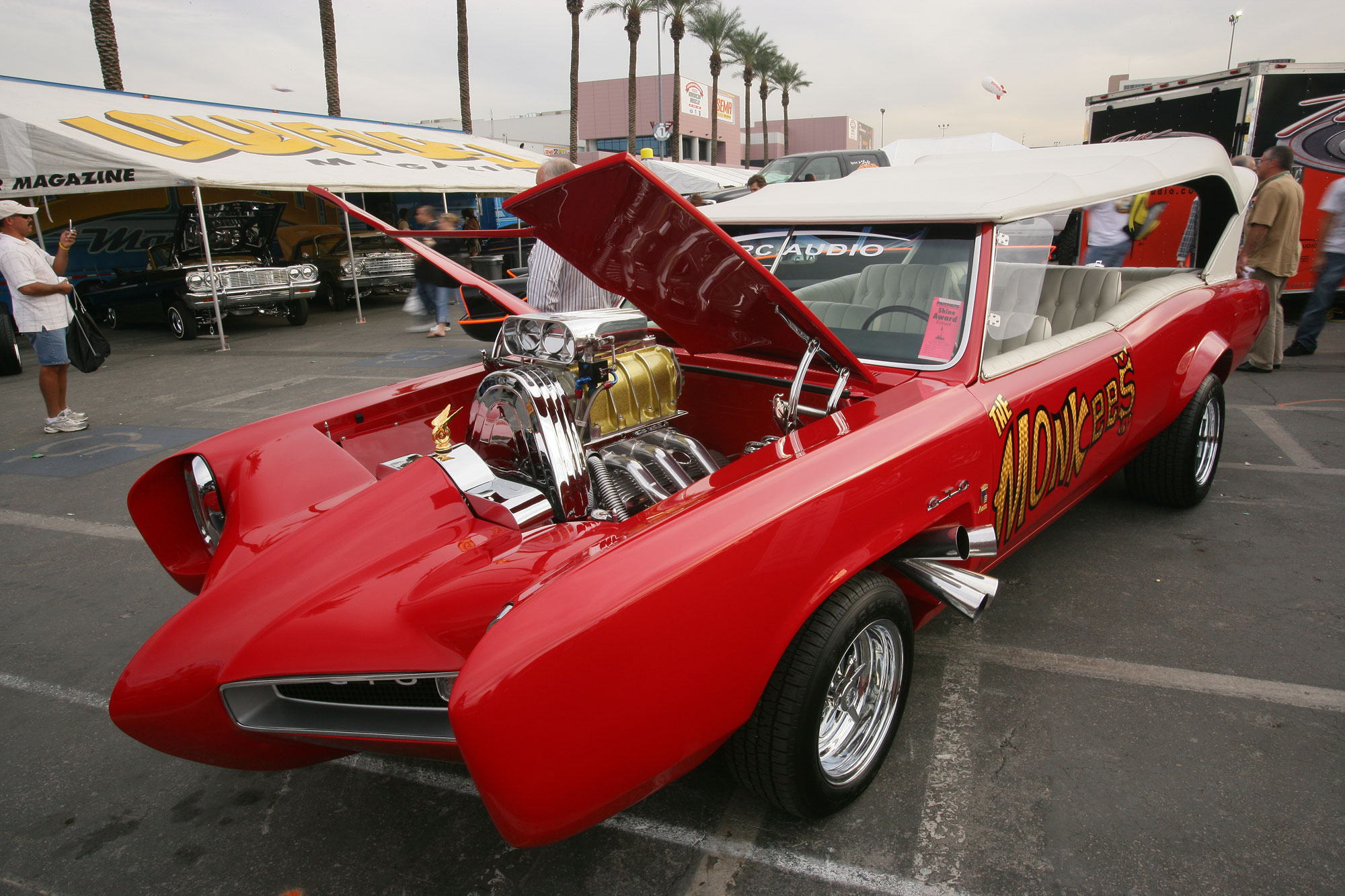
The Monkeemobile

The Monkeemobile was a modified Pontiac GTO designed and built by designer Dean Jeffries. The car featured a tilted forward split two-piece windshield, a touring car T-bucket-type convertible top, modified rear quarter panels and front fenders, exaggerated tail lamps, a set of four bucket seats with an extra third row bench where the rear deck should have been and a parachute. The front grille sported the GTO emblem.

== Awards and nominations ==
The Monkees won two Emmy Awards in 1967: Outstanding Comedy Series and Outstanding Directorial Achievement in Comedy (James Frawley, for the episode "Royal Flush"). Frawley was nominated for the same award the following season (for the episode "The Devil and Peter Tork"). Its win for Comedy Series was considered somewhat of an upset, as it bested long-time favorites The Andy Griffith Show, Bewitched, Get Smart and Hogan's Heroes.

== Decline and cancellation ==
For its first season (1966–1967), the series fared well in the television ratings bolstered by several hit records by the band. The Monkees became a huge pop culture sensation. However, the public did not realize the show and the band were just a regularly produced television series and the Monkees characters did not write or perform their own studio music except to provide the vocals. The only exception were their live performances. When the truth became known, there was considerable backlash from many fans and music critics. Liner notes for a 2006 re-release of More of the Monkees also noted that the album sales had consistently outperformed the TV show's Nielsen ratings; more were listening to the Monkees than watching The Monkees on TV. The West Coast American recording industry had many session musicians under contract performing for many musical acts, such as the Wrecking Crew, that recorded for the Monkees and many other music groups of this era, so this was nothing new.

However, NBC responded to the criticism and internal tensions by retooling the show in its second season with the Monkees now writing and performing much of their own music that was much less pop-oriented. Moreover, Don Kirshner, the producer for the Monkees for their first season and responsible for their first smash hits, was terminated by Colgems Records, resulting in a much less bubblegum rock sound for the band. In addition, the first season's clean cut looks were replaced by more hippy-looking attire. By 1968, both NBC and the band felt the series had run its course, as even with the changes, the formulaic premises of each episode were beginning to repeat themselves. The series was cancelled in 1968.

The series finale, Dolenz's original story "The Frodis Caper", featuring guest star Rip Taylor, was written as a satire of the industry and a parting shot thereto: an evil eye resembling the CBS logo is hypnotizing television viewers everywhere and the Monkees trace it to an alien plant being manipulated by a villain seeking world domination. When the plant emits smoke, it pacifies the villain, the meaning of which Dolenz stated he would leave to the imagination of the viewer. Tim Buckley, as a special guest, closes out the series with his "Song to the Siren".

Had the series been renewed for a third season, the Monkees had planned on abandoning the sitcom format and retooling the series. Ideas that had been bandied about included a music-centered live show, a variety show or a sketch comedy series.

In 1968, The Monkees starred in their own motion picture titled Head. Elements of the series were included in the film. The film did poorly at the box office and criticism was mostly mixed.

== Saturday morning and syndication ==
The Monkees enjoyed a resurgence on Saturday morning/afternoon television on CBS from September 1969 to September 1972 (sponsored by General Foods' Kool-Aid) and on ABC from September 1972 to August 1973. To coincide with the releases of The Monkees Present and Changes albums during this time period, many episodes replaced the older songs with tracks from these recent releases (this strategy was also employed during the summer of 1967, when many of the first-season episodes had their songs from the first two albums replaced with songs from the then-current single and from the third album Headquarters).

The 58 episodes were then sold to local markets for syndication in September 1975, where they typically appeared on independent television stations on weekday afternoons (the opening title sequence seen in the syndication package for all 58 episodes is from the second season of the original run). In many cases, episodes seen in the syndication package featured the updated soundtracks of the Saturday morning run or the earlier summer 1967 repeats.

A second, massive resurgence occurred when a Monkees marathon aired on February 23, 1986, on MTV. Within months, the 58 episodes were airing regularly throughout the United States on local stations (in edited form), Nickelodeon/MTV (uncut), as well as Canada on MuchMusic and on ITV in the UK as part of its Night Network strand from September 1987. Dolenz, Tork and Jones, already reunited for a "20th Anniversary Tour", went from playing small clubs to stadiums as the series caught on and the tour drew critical praise. The popularity led Columbia Pictures to create a "reboot" version of the franchise in 1987, New Monkees, but it flopped and was cancelled after a half season.

The series has aired edited versions on Antenna TV, a digital subchannel network that broadcasts classic programming from the 1950s-1990s era. IFC also picked up the series for reruns in spring 2015 until it was dropped a few years later. FETV, a cable and satellite network, began airing the series in December 2017 until it was removed a few years later itself. In 2018, Canadian superstation CHCH in Hamilton, Ontario began carrying the series; the station is viewable over-the-air in areas of New York State and Michigan that border Ontario.

From March 3, 2019, to April 26, 2020, restored episodes of The Monkees aired on MeTV on Sundays at 5 p.m. and 5:30 p.m., following an overwhelming response to Peter Tork's death after MeTV aired two episodes on February 24, 2019, as a tribute to the late Monkee.

AXS TV began airing the series on April 7, 2023, until it was removed in 2025.

Catchy Comedy presented a "Catchy Binge" of the series on the weekend of August 19–20, 2023, and again on Sunday, April 20, 2025. It was then added to the regular schedule on January 3, 2026, airing Saturdays at 8 a.m. and 8:30 a.m.

Rhino Records now serves as the underlying rights holder for this series, as they acquired the Monkees' music catalog, TV series and official logo from Raybert and Columbia Pictures in 1994. Sony Pictures Television, which has owned Columbia Pictures since 1989, remains the television distributor for syndication and cable.

== Legacy ==
The New Monkees was a 1987 reboot with a similar premise, with new actor/musicians playing new characters under their real names. The show lasted 13 episodes, and the New Monkees band released one album.

The 1999 children's TV show Miami 7 had a similar premise. S Club 7, which had been formed earlier by Simon Fuller, also played a fictionalized version of themselves, under their own names. The show aired on CBBC in 1999 before being imported to America on Freeform (then called the Fox Family Channel) under the name S Club 7 in Miami. Three additional seasons would be produced (set in L.A., Hollywood, and Spain), resulting in one for each of their four albums, as well as a nature series, S Club 7 Go Wild!, and a feature film, Seeing Double. The band had four UK #1 singles before breaking up in 2003.

The 2009-2013 Nickelodeon sitcom Big Time Rush followed the same basic format and premise; the producers of that show acknowledged The Monkees as their primary inspiration.

Dolenz said in a 2007 interview on the Roe Conn radio program that, while inspiration did come from the Beatles, the band's image was not meant to be a rip-off of them. He said that the Beatles were always depicted as superstars with legions of fans, whereas the Monkees were always depicted as unsigned and struggling to make a buck. This is reflected numerous times throughout the series, such as in the pilot, where Mike Nesmith is seen throwing darts at a Beatles poster and in the episode "Find the Monkees (The Audition)" where the Monkees struggle to see a famous television producer who is looking for a rock act for use in commercial advertisements; in the episode "I Was a 99-Pound Weakling", Micky is tricked into signing onto a bogus weight-training program, but objects by noting, "Where am I gonna get that kind of money? I'm an unemployed drummer." Also in a screen test, a Monkee asks what the Beatles have that they do not have. They sing "Thirteen million dollars!" Also, the last episode of the series, "The Frodis Caper", opens with the repetitive strains of the chorus of the Beatles' "Good Morning, Good Morning" from Sgt. Pepper's Lonely Hearts Club Band.

When commenting on the death of Davy Jones on February 29, 2012, Time magazine contributor James Poniewozik praised the show: "Even if the show never meant to be more than entertainment and a hit-single generator, we shouldn't sell The Monkees short. It was far better TV than it had to be; during an era of formulaic domestic sitcoms and wacky comedies, it was a stylistically ambitious show, with a distinctive visual style, absurdist sense of humor and unusual story structure. Whatever Jones and The Monkees were meant to be, they became creative artists in their own right, and Jones' chipper Brit-pop presence was a big reason they were able to produce work that was commercial, wholesome and yet impressively weird."

== Home video ==
Six two-episode VHS volumes of the television series were distributed by Musicvision/RCA/Columbia Pictures Home Video between July 15, 1986, and June 25, 1987, taking advantage of the group's 20th anniversary.

On October 17, 1995, with the Monkees' 30th anniversary looming, Rhino Home Video issued the complete series as a deluxe VHS boxed set containing all 58 episodes, plus the pilot and the 1969 special, 33⅓ Revolutions Per Monkee, in a total of 21 videotapes, along with a specially created full-color photo book that tells the history of the series, information about each episode and a variety of photographs from the series. First-run issues of the set also included a limited-edition wristwatch. A few months before, on May 22, Columbia House started releasing a Collector's Edition series also collecting all 58 Monkees episodes and the 1969 special; the one exception being the unaired 1965 Monkees pilot, which was available only on Rhino's video box set.

Rhino later released individual two-episode VHS volumes of the TV series between March 26, 1996, and April 11, 2000; it would be the last time The Monkees television show would be distributed on videocassette.

In 2003, Rhino Entertainment Company (under its Rhino Retrovision classic TV entertainment brand) released the complete series on DVD. Both seasons were re-released by Eagle Rock Entertainment in September 2011.

In honor of the band's 50th anniversary, Rhino released the complete series on Blu-ray on July 8, 2016.

== Bibliography ==
- Baker, Glenn A. (1986). Monkeemania: The Story of the Monkees. Plexus Publishing. ISBN 978-0-312-00003-5.
- Baker, Glenn A. (2000) [1986]. Monkeemania: The Story of the Monkees. Plexus Publishing. ISBN 978-0-85965-292-6.
- Lefcowitz, Eric (1985). The Monkees Tale. Last Gasp. ISBN 978-0-86719-338-1.
- Lefcowitz, Eric (1989) [1985]. The Monkees Tale. Last Gasp. ISBN 978-0-86719-378-7.
- Sandoval, Andrew (2005). The Monkees: The day-by-day story of the '60s TV pop sensation. Thunder Bay Press. ISBN 978-1-59223-372-4.
