= The Monkees Present =

Studio album by the Monkees
- Released: October 1, 1969
- Recorded: August – October 1966; June 1968 – August 1969
- Studios: RCA Victor (Hollywood); RCA Victor (Nashville); RCA Victor, B (Hollywood); Sunset Sound Recorders (Hollywood)
- Genres: Country rock; folk rock; pop; rock
- Length: 30:06
- Label: Colgems
- Producers: Micky Dolenz; Michael Nesmith; Davy Jones; Tommy Boyce; Bobby Hart; Bill Chadwick

The Monkees chronology
Greatest Hits (1969)	The Monkees Present (1969)	Changes (1970)

Singles from The Monkees Present
- 1. "Listen to the Band" / "Someday Man" Released: April 26, 1969; 2. "Good Clean Fun" / "Mommy and Daddy" Released: September 6, 1969

1994 Rhino CD reissue

Professional ratings
Review scores
Source	Rating
AllMusic	3/5 stars

The Monkees Present (full title being The Monkees Present Micky, David, Michael, also known as simply Present) is the eighth studio album by the American pop rock band the Monkees, released in 1969 by Colgems Records. It was the second Monkees album released after the departure of Peter Tork and the last to feature Michael Nesmith until 1996's Justus.

== History ==
The original plan for Present was to release a double album which devoted one side to each member of the group, who by now were recording virtually as solo artists. With Tork now gone, and record sales waning, the decision was made to pare the track selection down to a single disc.

By the time recording had begun in earnest for Present, the Monkees had passed their commercial peak. As Screen Gems' interest in the Monkees' activities waned, the members were given more control over the creation of the album. Unlike Instant Replay, all but two songs were recorded in 1968 or 1969, and the album was accompanied by a strong advertising push (including a cross promotion with Kool-Aid) and a tour with Sam & The Goodtimers — a seven-piece R&B backing band. This album was the Monkees' last attempt at commercial viability, reaching only No. 100 on the Billboard charts. Shortly after the album's release, Nesmith announced that he was leaving the Monkees to form his own group, the First National Band.

The album featured two singles: "Listen to the Band", b/w the non-LP song "Someday Man"; and "Good Clean Fun" b/w "Mommy and Daddy", which upon release reached No. 63 and No. 82, respectively, in the US, with neither charting in the UK. Both singles did much better in Australia, reaching No. 15 and No. 26, respectively, and giving the Monkees their last hits. The title of "Good Clean Fun", which bears no relation to the lyrics, was a direct response to a music publisher (believed to be Lester Sill) who told Michael Nesmith that, in order to have hits, he would have to write songs that were "good clean fun".

Though not a huge hit at the time, "Listen to the Band" has become a sort of theme for the group. Though Nesmith claims the lyrics weren't a plea to be judged on musical merit, people nonetheless chose to view them that way. Rhino records even chose the song's title as the name of the group's box set released in April 1991. Nesmith would later re-record it with his own group The First National Band. "Listen to the Band" was originally performed with Tork on their NBC TV Special 33 1/3 Revolutions Per Monkee early that same year. That version differs greatly from the single or album release. The album mix of the song has a slightly longer organ bridge section than the single mix does. "Mommy and Daddy" finds Micky overtly tackling the political issue of the treatment of American Indians. The album version was dramatically toned down from the original, which also touched on drug use, war, sexual reproduction, social ignorance and the JFK assassination.

Nesmith's "Hollywood", as well as Boyce and Hart's "Apples, Peaches, Bananas and Pears" and "(My) Storybook of You", were songs that were considered for the album but ultimately rejected.

== Track listing ==
Side one
No.	Title	Lead vocals	Length
1.	"Little Girl" (Micky Dolenz)	Dolenz	2:00
2.	"Good Clean Fun" (Michael Nesmith)	Nesmith	2:19
3.	"If I Knew" (Bill Chadwick, David Jones)	Jones	2:22
4.	"Bye Bye Baby Bye Bye" (Dolenz, Ric Klein)	Dolenz	2:20
5.	"Never Tell a Woman Yes" (Nesmith)	Nesmith	3:47
6.	"Looking for the Good Times" (Tommy Boyce, Bobby Hart)	Jones	2:04

Side two
No.	Title	Lead vocals	Length
1.	"Ladies Aid Society" (Boyce, Hart)	Jones	2:41
2.	"Listen to the Band" (Nesmith)	Nesmith	2:42
3.	"French Song" (Chadwick)	Jones	2:22
4.	"Mommy and Daddy" (Dolenz)	Dolenz	2:13
5.	"Oklahoma Backroom Dancer" (Michael Martin Murphey)	Nesmith	2:36
6.	"Pillow Time" (Janelle Scott, Matt Willis)	Dolenz	2:32

1994 CD bonus tracks
No.	Title	Length
13.	"Calico Girlfriend Samba (Previously Unissued)" (Nesmith)	2:33
14.	"The Good Earth (Previously Unissued)" (Ben Nisbet)	1:38
15.	"Listen to the Band (Previously Unissued Version)" (Nesmith)	2:46
16.	"Mommy and Daddy (Previously Unissued Version)" (Dolenz)	2:08
17.	"The Monkees Present Radio Promo (Previously Unissued)"	1:03

== Personnel ==
Credits adapted from Rhino Handmade 2013 "Deluxe Edition" box set, unless otherwise noted.

The Monkees

- Micky Dolenz – lead vocals (1, 4, 10, 12), backing vocals (1, 4, 6, 10), acoustic guitar (1, 12), harmony vocal (7), piano (10); drums (10)
- Michael Nesmith – lead vocals (2, 5, 8, 11), acoustic guitar (5), electric guitar (8)
- David Jones – lead vocals (3, 6, 7, 9), backing vocals (3, 4)

Additional musicians

- Louis Shelton – electric guitar (1, 4, 6–7, 12), acoustic guitar (9), guitar (11)
- Ray Pohlman – bass guitar (1, 12)
- Norbert Putnam – bass guitar (2, 8)
- Max Bennett – bass guitar (3, 9, 11)
- Joe Osborn – bass guitar (4–5)
- Larry Taylor – bass guitar (6–7)
- Earl Palmer – drums (1, 12)
- Jerry Carrigan – drums (2, 8)
- Hal Blaine – drums (3–5, 9)
- Billy Lewis – drums (6–7)
- Eddie Hoh – drums (11)
- Coco Dolenz – additional backing vocals (1, 10)
- Wayne Moss – guitar (2, 8)
- Gerry McGee – guitar (6–7)
- Dom DeMieri – guitar (10)
- Mike Deasy – guitar (11)
- Lloyd Green – steel guitar (2, 8)
- Bobby Thompson – banjo (2, 8)
- David Briggs – piano (2, 8)
- Buddy Spicher – violin (2)
- David Cohen – acoustic guitar (3)
- Michel Rubini – piano (3, 11), keyboards (8, 10), organ (9)
- Bill Chadwick – additional backing vocals (3)
- James Burton – banjo (4)
- Tommy Morgan – harmonica (4)
- Al Casey – banjo (5)
- Wayne Erwin – guitar (6–7), backing vocals (7)
- Tommy Boyce – acoustic guitar (6), backing vocals (6–7)
- Bobby Hart – organ (6), backing vocals (6–7), piano (7)
- Gene Estes – tambourine (6)
- Ron Hicklin – backing vocals (6–7)
- Emil Richards – percussion (7, 9), vibes (9), chimes (9), shaker (9)
- Bob Jung – horns (7)
- Don McGinnis – horns (7), brass (8, 10)
- Steve Huffsteter – trumpet (7)
- Gilbert Falco – trombone (7)
- Dick Hyde – trombone (7)
- Mike Saluzzi – guitar (8, 10)
- Charlie McCoy – harmonica (8)
- Bud Brisbois – trumpet (8, 10)
- Buddy Childers – trumpet (8, 10)
- Ray Triscari – trumpet (8, 10)
- Dick Nash – trombone (8, 10)
- John Kitzmiller – tuba (8, 10)
- Frank Bugbee – acoustic guitar (9)
- Tim Weisberg – flute (9)

Unconfirmed personnel and duties

- Harold Bradley or Billy Sanford – additional guitar (2, 8)
- Percussion (2, 8)
- Acoustic guitar, additional backing vocals (4)
- Larry Knechtel or Michel Rubini – piano (5)
- Pat Coghlan – unknown (10)
- Bass (10)
- Acoustic guitar, tambourine, shaker (11)

Technical

- Shorty Rogers – arranger (1, 4, 10, 12), horn arranger (8)
- Micky Dolenz – producer (1, 4, 10, 12)
- Michael Nesmith – producer (2, 5, 8, 11)
- Bill Chadwick – producer (3, 9)
- Davy Jones – producer (3, 9)
- Tommy Boyce – producer (6–7)
- Bobby Hart – producer (6–7)
- Brendan Cahill – music coordinator
- Neko Cholis – cover design

== Charts ==
=== Weekly charts ===
Chart (1969)	Peak position
US Billboard 200	100

=== Singles ===
Year	Single	Chart	Peak Position
1969	"Listen to the Band"	Billboard Hot 100	63
1969	"Good Clean Fun"	Billboard Hot 100	82
