= Music Box (The Monkees album) =

Box set by the Monkees
- Released: February 20, 2001
- Recorded: 1966–1996
- Genre: Rock
- Length: 288:32
- Label: Rhino
- Producers: Tommy Boyce, Bobby Hart, Jack Keller, Michael Nesmith, Jeff Barry, Gerry Goffin, Carole King, Carole Bayer Sager, Neil Sedaka, Chip Douglas, Micky Dolenz, Davy Jones, Peter Tork, Bones Howe, Felton Jarvis, Michael Lloyd, Roger Bechirian

The Monkees chronology
The Headquarters Sessions (2000)	Music Box (2001)	The Definitive Monkees (2001)

Professional ratings
Review scores
Source	Rating
Allmusic	2.5/5 stars

Music Box is a four-CD set by the Monkees. It replaced the previous Monkees box set, entitled Listen to the Band. In addition to music recorded in the 1960s, it also includes music from the Monkees reunions in 1986 and 1996, as well as previously unreleased versions.

== Track listing ==
Disc 1: 1966
No.	Title	Writer(s)	Original release	Length
1.	"(Theme From) The Monkees"	Tommy Boyce, Bobby Hart	From the album The Monkees (10/66)	2:19
2.	"I Wanna Be Free" (fast version)	Boyce, Hart	Originally unissued • First collected on the album Missing Links Volume Two (1/23/90)	2:47
3.	"Let's Dance On"	Boyce, Hart	From the album The Monkees (10/66)	2:30
4.	"Last Train to Clarksville"	Boyce, Hart	Originally issued as Colgems single #1001 (8/16/66) • Also included on the album The Monkees (10/66)	2:46
5.	"Take a Giant Step"	Gerry Goffin, Carole King	Originally issued as Colgems single #1001 (8/16/66) • Also included on the album The Monkees (10/66)	2:33
6.	"All the King's Horses"	Michael Nesmith	Originally unissued • First collected on the album Missing Links, Volume Two (1/23/90)	2:16
7.	"Saturday's Child"	David Gates	From the album The Monkees (10/66)	2:43
8.	"Papa Gene's Blues"	Nesmith	From the album The Monkees (10/66)	1:59
9.	"I Wanna Be Free" (album version)	Boyce, Hart	From the album The Monkees (10/66)	2:24
10.	"Sweet Young Thing"	Goffin, King, Nesmith	From the album The Monkees (10/66)	1:56
11.	"Gonna Buy Me a Dog"	Boyce, Hart	From the album The Monkees (10/66)	2:41
12.	"I Don't Think You Know Me" (first recorded version)	Goffin, King	Originally unissued • First collected on the album Missing Links (7/6/87)	2:16
13.	"I'm a Believer"	Neil Diamond	Originally issued as Colgems single #1002 (11/12/66) • Also included on the album More of the Monkees (1/10/67)	2:46
14.	"(I'm Not Your) Steppin' Stone"	Boyce, Hart	Originally issued as Colgems single #1002 (11/12/66) • Also included on the album More of the Monkees (1/10/67)	2:19
15.	"She"	Boyce, Hart	From the album More of the Monkees (1/10/67)	2:39
16.	"Mary, Mary"	Nesmith	From the album More of the Monkees (1/10/67)	2:17
17.	"Your Auntie Grizelda"	Diane Hildebrand, Jack Keller	From the album More of the Monkees (1/10/67)	2:28
18.	"Of You" (previously unissued mix)	Bill Chadwick, John Chadwick	Previously unissued • An alternate mix was first collected on the album Missing Links (7/6/87)	1:59
19.	"Look Out (Here Comes Tomorrow)" (previously unissued extended version)	Diamond	Previously unissued • An edited version was included on the album More of the Monkees (1/10/67)	2:48
20.	"The Kind of Girl I Could Love"	Roger Atkins, Nesmith	From the album More of the Monkees (1/10/67)	1:53
21.	"Sometime in the Morning"	Goffin, King	From the album More of the Monkees (1/10/67)	2:28
22.	"When Love Comes Knockin' (At Your Door)"	Carole Bayer Sager, Neil Sedaka	From the album More of the Monkees (1/10/67)	1:48
23.	"Do Not Ask for Love" (first recorded version)	Michael Martin Murphey	Originally unissued • First collected on the album Missing Links Volume Two (1/23/90)	3:00
24.	"Valleri" (first recorded version)	Boyce, Hart	Originally unissued • First collected on the album Missing Links Volume Two (1/23/90)	2:32
25.	"I'll Be Back Up on My Feet" (first recorded version)	Sandy Linzer, Denny Randell	Originally unissued • First collected on the album Missing Links Volume Two (1/23/90)	2:35

Disc 2: 1967
No.	Title	Writer(s)	Original release	Length
1.	"A Little Bit Me, A Little Bit You"	Diamond	Originally issued as Colgems single #1004 (3/8/67) • First collected on the album The Monkees Greatest Hits (6/69)	2:50
2.	"She Hangs Out" (single version)	Jeff Barry	Originally issued as Colgems (Canada) single #1003 (2/67) (withdrawn) • First collected on the albums Monkeemania (40 Timeless Hits) (10/79) and Monkee Business (11/82)	2:34
3.	"The Girl I Knew Somewhere"	Nesmith	Originally issued as Colgems single #1004 (3/8/67) • First collected on the album The Monkees (7/76)	2:35
4.	"All of Your Toys"	Bill Martin	Originally unissued • First collected on the album Missing Links (7/6/87)	3:08
5.	"Love to Love"	Diamond	Originally unissued • First collected on the albums Monkeemania (40 Timeless Hits) (10/79) and Monkee Business (11/82)	2:28
6.	"You Told Me"	Nesmith	From the album Headquarters (5/22/67)	2:26
7.	"I'll Spend My Life with You"	Boyce, Hart	From the album Headquarters (5/22/67)	2:24
8.	"Forget That Girl"	Douglas Farthing-Hatlelid	From the album Headquarters (5/22/67)	2:25
9.	"You Just May Be the One"	Nesmith	From the album Headquarters (5/22/67)	2:03
10.	"Shades of Gray"	Barry Mann, Cynthia Weil	From the album Headquarters (5/22/67)	3:22
11.	"For Pete's Sake"	Peter Tork, Joey Richards	From the album Headquarters (5/22/67)	2:11
12.	"Sunny Girlfriend"	Nesmith	From the album Headquarters (5/22/67)	2:33
13.	"No Time"	Hank Cicalo	From the album Headquarters (5/22/67)	2:07
14.	"Randy Scouse Git"	Micky Dolenz	From the album Headquarters (5/22/67)	2:33
15.	"Pleasant Valley Sunday" (single version)	Goffin, King	Originally issued as Colgems single #1007 (7/10/67) • First collected on the album Monkee Business (11/82) • An alternate mix was included on the album Pisces, Aquarius, Capricorn & Jones Ltd. (11/14/67)	3:07
16.	"Words"	Boyce, Hart	Originally issued as Colgems single #1007 (7/10/67) • Also included on the album Pisces, Aquarius, Capricorn & Jones Ltd. (11/14/67)	2:51
17.	"Daydream Believer"	John Stewart	Originally issued as Colgems single #1012 (10/25/67) • Also included on the album The Birds, The Bees & The Monkees (4/22/68)	3:00
18.	"Goin’ Down"	Dolenz, Hildebrand, Davy Jones, Nesmith, Tork	Originally issued as Colgems single #1012 (10/25/67) • First collected on the albums Monkeemania (40 Timeless Hits) (10/79) and Monkee Business (11/82)	4:23
19.	"Salesman"	Craig Vincent Smith	From the album Pisces, Aquarius, Capricorn & Jones Ltd. (11/14/67)	2:36
20.	"The Door Into Summer"	Douglas, Martin	From the album Pisces, Aquarius, Capricorn & Jones Ltd. (11/14/67)	2:49
21.	"Love Is Only Sleeping"	Mann, Weil	From the album Pisces, Aquarius, Capricorn & Jones Ltd. (11/14/67)	2:31
22.	"Cuddly Toy"	Harry Nilsson	From the album Pisces, Aquarius, Capricorn & Jones Ltd. (11/14/67)	2:40
23.	"What Am I Doing Hangin' 'Round?"	Murphey, Owen Castleman	From the album Pisces, Aquarius, Capricorn & Jones Ltd. (11/14/67)	3:08
24.	"Daily Nightly"	Nesmith	From the album Pisces, Aquarius, Capricorn & Jones Ltd. (11/14/67)	2:32
25.	"Star Collector"	Goffin, King	From the album Pisces, Aquarius, Capricorn & Jones Ltd. (11/14/67)	4:24

Disc 3: 1968
No.	Title	Writer(s)	Original release	Length
1.	"Valleri"	Boyce, Hart	Originally issued as Colgems single #1019 (3/2/68) • Also included on the album The Birds, The Bees & The Monkees (4/22/68)	2:20
2.	"Tapioca Tundra"	Nesmith	Originally issued as Colgems single #1019 (3/2/68) • Also included on the album The Birds, The Bees & The Monkees (4/22/68)	3:06
3.	"Dream World"	Jones, Steve Pitts	From the album The Birds, The Bees & The Monkees (4/22/68)	3:20
4.	"Auntie's Municipal Court"	Keith Allison, Nesmith	From the album The Birds, The Bees & The Monkees (4/22/68)	4:04
5.	"P.O. Box 9847"	Boyce, Hart	From the album The Birds, The Bees & The Monkees (4/22/68)	3:13
6.	"Zor and Zam"	Chadwick, Chadwick	From the album The Birds, The Bees & The Monkees (4/22/68)	2:07
7.	"Carlisle Wheeling" (first recorded version)	Nesmith	Originally unissued • First collected on the album Missing Links (7/6/87)	3:33
8.	"Tear the Top Right Off My Head"	Tork	Originally unissued • First collected on the album Listen to the Band (9/24/91)	2:06
9.	"The Girl I Left Behind Me" (first recorded version)	Sedaka, Bayer	Originally unissued • First collected on the deluxe reissue of the album The Birds, The Bees & The Monkees (9/20/94)	2:41
10.	"Nine Times Blue"	Nesmith	Originally unissued • First collected on the album Missing Links (7/6/87)	2:09
11.	"Come On In"	Jo Mapes	Originally unissued • First collected on the album Missing Links, Volume Two (1/23/90)	3:09
12.	"D.W. Washburn"	Leiber & Stoller	Originally issued as Colgems single #1023 (6/8/68) • First collected on the albums Monkeemania (40 Timeless Hits) (10/79) and Monkee Business (11/82)	2:49
13.	"It's Nice to Be with You"	Jerry Goldstein	Originally issued as Colgems single #1023 (6/8/68) • First collected on the album The Monkees (7/76)	2:52
14.	"St. Matthew"	Nesmith	Originally unissued • First collected on the album Missing Links, Volume Two (1/23/90)	2:43
15.	"Porpoise Song (Theme from Head)" (single version)	Goffin, King	Originally issued as Colgems single #1031 (10/5/68) • First collected on the also Monkeemania (40 Timeless Hits) (10/79) and Monkee Business (11/82) • An edited version was included on the album Head (12/1/68)	4:10
16.	"As We Go Along"	King, Toni Stern	Originally issued as Colgems single #1031 (10/5/68) • Also included on the album Head (12/1/68)	3:52
17.	"Ditty Diego – War Chant"	Jack Nicholson, Bob Rafelson	From the album Head (12/1/68)	0:49
18.	"Circle Sky" (live version)	Nesmith	Originally unissued • First collected on the albums Monkeemania (40 Timeless Hits) (10/79) and Monkee Business (11/82)	2:44
19.	"Can You Dig It"	Tork	From the album Head (12/1/68)	3:22
20.	"Daddy's Song" (previously unissued long version)	Nilsson	Originally unissued • An edited version was included on the album Head (12/1/68)	3:27
21.	"Long Title: Do I Have to Do This All Over Again"	Tork	From the album Head (12/1/68)	2:38

Disc 4: 1969–96
No.	Title	Writer(s)	Original release	Length
1.	"Tear Drop City"	Boyce, Hart	Originally issued as Colgems single #5000 (2/8/69) • Also included on the album Instant Replay (2/15/69)	2:01
2.	"A Man Without a Dream"	Goffin, King	Originally issued as Colgems single #5000 (2/8/69) • Also included on the album Instant Replay (2/15/69)	3:04
3.	"Through the Looking Glass"	Red Baldwin, Boyce, Hart	From the album Instant Replay (2/15/69)	2:41
4.	"I Won't Be the Same Without Her"	Goffin, King	From the album Instant Replay (2/15/69)	2:40
5.	"You and I"	Chadwick, Jones	From the album Instant Replay (2/15/69)	2:13
6.	"While I Cry"	Nesmith	From the album Instant Replay (2/15/69)	2:59
7.	"Shorty Blackwell"	Dolenz	From the album Instant Replay (2/15/69)	5:39
8.	"If I Ever Get to Saginaw Again"	Keller, Bob Russell	Originally unissued • First collected on the album Missing Links Volume Two (1/23/90)	2:44
9.	"Smile"	Jones	Originally unissued • First collected on the Deluxe Reissue of the album Instant Replay (1/24/95)	2:18
10.	"Listen to the Band" (single version)	Nesmith	Originally issued as Colgems single #5004 (4/26/69) • First collected on the album Listen to the Band (9/24/91) • An extended version was included on the album The Monkees Present (10/69)	2:29
11.	"Someday Man"	Roger Nichols, Paul Williams	Originally issued as Colgems single #5004 (4/26/69) • First collected on the album The Monkees (7/76)	2:40
12.	"Some of Shelly's Blues"	Nesmith	Originally unissued • First collected on the album Missing Links, Volume Two (1/23/90)	2:30
13.	"Mommy and Daddy"	Dolenz	Originally issued as Colgems single #5005 (9/6/69) • Also included on the album The Monkees Present (10/69)	2:13
14.	"Good Clean Fun"	Nesmith	Originally issued as Colgems single #5005 (9/6/69) • Also included on the album The Monkees Present (10/69)	2:18
15.	"Looking for the Good Times"	Boyce, Hart	From the album The Monkees Present (10/69)	2:03
16.	"Steam Engine"	Douglas	Originally unissued • First collected on the albums Monkeemania (40 Timeless Hits) (10/79) and Monkee Business (11/82)	2:23
17.	"I Never Thought It Peculiar"	Boyce, Hart	From the album Changes (6/70)	2:27
18.	"Midnight Train"	Dolenz	From the album Changes (6/70)	2:07
19.	"Oh My My"	Barry, Andy Kim	Originally issued as Colgems single #5011 (4/70) • Also included on the album Changes (6/70)	3:02
20.	"I Love You Better"	Barry, Kim	Originally issued as Colgems single #5011 (4/70) • Also included on the album Changes (6/70)	2:28
21.	"Do You Feel It Too?"	Barry, Kim	From the album Changes (6/70)	2:35
22.	"Do It in the Name of Love"	Bobby Bloom, Neil Goldberg	Originally issued as Bell single #986 (4/71) • First collected on the Deluxe Reissue of the album Changes (9/20/94)	2:07
23.	"That Was Then, This Is Now"	Vance Brescia	Originally issued as Arista single #ASI-9505 (6/27/86) • Also included on the album Then & Now... The Best of The Monkees (8/86)	4:02
24.	"Heart and Soul"	Simon Byrne, Andrew Howell	Originally issued as Rhino single #RNOR-74408 (7/87) • Also included on the album Pool It! (8/1/87)	3:56
25.	"MGBGT" (live version)	Tork	From the album 20th Anniversary Tour 1986 (7/87) • Also issued as Rhino single #RNOR-74408 (7/87)	2:35
26.	"Every Step of the Way" (single version)	Ian Hunter, Mark Clarke	Originally issued as Rhino single #RNOR-74410 (11/87) • First collected on the album Listen to the Band (9/24/91) • An alternate mix was included on the album Pool It! (8/1/87)	3:18
27.	"Oh, What a Night"	Jones	From the album Justus (10/15/96)	3:12
28.	"You and I"	Dolenz, Jones	From the album Justus (10/15/96)	2:55

=== Notes ===
- "I Wanna Be Free" (fast version), "I Don't Think You Know Me" (first recorded version), "Look Out (Here Comes Tomorrow)", "The Kind of Girl I Could Love", "Do Not Ask for Love" (first recorded version), "Valleri" (first recorded version), "All of Your Toys", "Carlisle Wheeling" (first recorded version), "The Girl I Left Behind Me" (first recorded version), "Ditty Diego – War Chant", and "Daddy's Song" are presented in new stereo mixes that were remixed for inclusion on this album.
- "All the King's Horses" is presented in a new mono mix that was remixed for inclusion on this album.
- The stereo mixes of "Love to Love", "Some of Shelly's Blues", and "Steam Engine" were previously unreleased, even though this is neither reflected on the back cover nor in the booklet. The stereo mix of "Love to Love" is very similar, but not identical to the one that was first released on Missing Links Volume Three.
- "Tapioca Tundra", "Auntie's Municipal Court", "Listen to the Band", and "Mommy and Daddy" are presented in alternate stereo mixes that were first released on the Listen to the Band box set.
- "Tear the Top Right Off My Head" is presented in an alternate mono mix that was first released on the Listen to the Band box set.
