= Re-Focus =

Greatest hits album by the Monkees
- Released: 1972
- Recorded: 1966–1969
- Genre: Pop rock
- Length: 30:51
- Label: Bell
- Producer: Various

The Monkees chronology
Barrel Full of Monkees (1971)	Re-Focus (1972)	The Monkees Greatest Hits (1976)

Re-Focus is a 1972 compilation album of songs by the Monkees, released on Bell Records, the successor to Colgems Records, the Monkees' original record label.

The album replaced Colgems' previous three "best-of" collections, Greatest Hits, Golden Hits, and Barrel Full of Monkees.

Re-Focus was repackaged and reissued a number of times in various territories. Each release featured the same track listing but with different packaging and artwork, usually under the title The Best of the Monkees or simply The Monkees (not to be confused with their debut album of the same name). In 1973, Polydor in the Netherlands issued the album as Superstarshine Vol. 29, and in 1979, Arista in Japan issued the album as The Best, with three additional tracks: "Star Collector," "Valleri", and "Words."

In 1976, following Bell Records' renaming to Arista Records, the track listing of Re-Focus was repackaged again for the US as The Monkees Greatest Hits.

== Track listing ==
Side 1

No.	Title	Source	Length
1.	"(Theme from) The Monkees" (Tommy Boyce / Bobby Hart)	From The Monkees	2:20
2.	"Last Train to Clarksville" (Tommy Boyce / Bobby Hart)	Single a-side; from The Monkees	2:40
3.	"She" (Tommy Boyce / Bobby Hart)	From More of the Monkees	2:27
4.	"Daydream Believer" (John Stewart)	Single a-side; from The Birds, The Bees & The Monkees	2:58
5.	"Listen to the Band" (Michael Nesmith)	Single a-side; from The Monkees Present	2:45
6.	"A Little Bit Me, A Little Bit You" (Neil Diamond)	Single a-side	2:35

Side 2

No.	Title	Source	Length
1.	"I'm a Believer" (Neil Diamond)	Single a-side; from More of the Monkees	2:41
2.	"I Wanna Be Free" (Tommy Boyce / Bobby Hart)	From The Monkees	2:24
3.	"Pleasant Valley Sunday" (Gerry Goffin / Carole King)	Single a-side; from Pisces, Aquarius, Capricorn & Jones, Ltd.	3:10
4.	"(I'm Not Your) Steppin' Stone" (Tommy Boyce / Bobby Hart)	B-side of "I'm a Believer"; from More of the Monkees	2:25
5.	"Shades of Gray" (Barry Mann / Cynthia Weil)	From Headquarters	3:20
