= Barrel Full of Monkees =

Compilation album by the Monkees
- Released: January 1971
- Genre: Pop rock
- Label: Colgems
- Producers: Jeff Barry, Chip Douglas, Jack Keller, Michael Nesmith, Boyce and Hart, The Monkees

The Monkees chronology
Changes (1970)	Barrel Full of Monkees (1971)	Re-Focus (1972)

Barrel Full of Monkees is a compilation album of songs by the American pop rock band the Monkees, released in 1971 by Colgems Records. The double album was produced and marketed for children, after the success of the Monkees' television show being rebroadcast on Saturday mornings by CBS, and was the last LP ever issued on the Colgems label.

Despite being issued on the Colgems label, the album was released by RCA Records as part of a specially priced 2-LP series called "This Is...". Several Popular RCA Victor artists including Chet Atkins, Harry Belafonte, Perry Como and Henry Mancini had albums in the series and the RCA LP releases carried a VPS prefix and listed for $5.98, which was the list price for an average single RCA Victor LP at the time. The Monkees' double set also listed for $5.98 and carried a then-new "SCOS" prefix and new numbering series, "1001", making it unrelated to any other previous Colgems issue or pricing series.

The 20-song collection included 13 of the 14 tracks found on the Monkees' Greatest Hits (1969), the missing exception being "Zor and Zam".

After the closing of Colgems in 1971, Barrel Full of Monkees was deleted, with the next Monkees compilation, Re-Focus (1972), being issued by Colgems' successor, Bell Records.

== Track listing ==
Side one
No.	Title	Length
1.	"I'm a Believer" (Neil Diamond)	2:41
2.	"Cuddly Toy" (Harry Nilsson)	2:45
3.	"Star Collector" (Gerry Goffin, Carole King)	3:30
4.	"What Am I Doing Hangin' Round" (Michael Martin Murphy, Owens Castleman)	3:02
5.	"Pleasant Valley Sunday" (Goffin, King)	3:10

Side two
No.	Title	Length
1.	"Last Train to Clarksville" (Tommy Boyce, Bobby Hart)	2:40
2.	"Valleri" (Boyce, Hart)	2:16
3.	"Randy Scouse Git" (Micky Dolenz)	2:35
4.	"I Wanna Be Free" (Boyce, Hart)	2:24
5.	"Listen to the Band" (Michael Nesmith)	2:45

Side three
No.	Title	Length
1.	"(Theme from) The Monkees" (Boyce, Hart)	2:20
2.	"She Hangs Out" (Jeff Barry, Ellie Greenwich)	2:33
3.	"Gonna Buy Me a Dog" (Boyce, Hart)	2:38
4.	"She" (Boyce, Hart)	2:27
5.	"(I'm Not Your) Steppin' Stone" (Boyce, Hart)	2:25

Side four
No.	Title	Length
1.	"Daydream Believer" (John Stewart)	2:58
2.	"Your Auntie Grizelda" (Jack Keller, Diane Hildebrand)	2:28
3.	"A Little Bit Me, A Little Bit You" (Diamond)	2:35
4.	"Mary, Mary" (Nesmith)	2:12
5.	"Shades of Gray" (Barry Mann, Cynthia Weil)	3:20
