= Summer 1967: The Complete U.S. Concert Recordings =

Live album by the Monkees
- Released: May 18, 2001
- Recorded: August 12, 25–27, 1967
- Venues: Municipal Auditorium (Mobile, Alabama) Seattle Center Coliseum (Seattle, Washington) The Coliseum (Spokane, Washington) Memorial Coliseum (Portland, Oregon)
- Genre: Rock
- Label: Rhino Handmade

The Monkees chronology
The Definitive Monkees (2001)	Summer 1967: The Complete U.S. Concert Recordings (2001)	2001: Live in Las Vegas (2001)

Professional ratings
Review scores
Source	Rating
AllMusic	2.5/5 stars

Summer 1967: The Complete U.S. Concert Recordings is a four-CD compilation of live recordings by the American pop rock band the Monkees, released in 2001 by Rhino Handmade. Recorded during the band's summer 1967 tour, the CD was a limited edition release, with 3,500 copies being made available. 16 of these tracks had previously been compiled by Rhino and released as Live 1967 in 1987.

The tour began after the May release of the band's third album, Headquarters (1967), and the bulk of the material was culled from that album, in addition to their biggest singles from the first album, The Monkees (1966), and second album, More of the Monkees (1967). There were also a quartet of cover songs, with each of the Monkees choosing one to perform with their opening act, the Sundowners.

The set list for each CD is identical, as the band performed the same group of songs in order at each show.

- CD 1: Municipal Auditorium, Mobile, Alabama - August 12, 1967 (mono)
- CD 2: Seattle Center Coliseum, Seattle, Washington - August 25, 1967 (stereo)
- CD 3: Memorial Coliseum, Portland, Oregon - August 26, 1967 (stereo)
- CD 4: The Coliseum, Spokane, Washington - August 27, 1967 (stereo)

== Track listing ==
1. "(Theme From) The Monkees" (Tommy Boyce, Bobby Hart)
2. "Last Train to Clarksville" (Boyce, Hart)
3. "You Just May Be the One" (Michael Nesmith)
4. "The Girl I Knew Somewhere" (Nesmith)
5. "I Wanna Be Free" (Boyce, Hart)
6. "Sunny Girlfriend" (Nesmith)
7. "Your Auntie Grizelda" (Diane Hildebrand, Jack Keller)
8. "Forget That Girl" (Chip Douglas)
9. "Sweet Young Thing" (Nesmith)
10. "Mary, Mary" (Nesmith)
11. "Cripple Creek" (Trad.; arranged by Peter Tork)
12. "You Can't Judge a Book by the Cover" (Willie Dixon)
13. "Gonna Build a Mountain" (Anthony Newley, Leslie Bricusse)
14. "I Got a Woman" (Ray Charles, Renald Richard)
15. "I'm a Believer" (Neil Diamond)
16. "Randy Scouse Git" (Micky Dolenz)
17. "(I'm Not Your) Steppin' Stone" (Boyce, Hart)

== Personnel ==
Credits adapted from CD box set.

The Monkees

- Mike Nesmith – lead guitar, harmonica, vocals
- Peter Tork – bass guitar, keyboards, banjo, vocals
- Davy Jones – tambourine, vocals
- Micky Dolenz – drums, vocals

The Sundowners
Backing musicians on tracks 11–14:

- Dom DeMieri – lead guitar
- Eddie Placidi – rhythm guitar
- Bobby Dick – bass guitar
- Kim Copli – drums, keyboards
- Eddie Brick – percussion

Technical

- Hank Cicalo – original recording engineer (Seattle, Portland, Spokane)
- Winton Teel – original recording engineer (Mobile)
- Roland Worthington Hand – compilation producer
- Rectangle Van Elk – assistant to the curator
- D K Baker – deputy chief archivist
- T M Tbyshatlt Tpaiad – archival assistance
- Bob Fisher – remixing, remastering, editing, assembly
- Bryan Lasley – art direction, design
- Patrick Pending – art direction, design
- Bryan Thomas – institute wordsmith
- Michael Ochs – archive photographs
- Hugh Brown – photographs
- Gary Strobl – archival materials
