= The Definitive Monkees =

Greatest hits album by The Monkees
- Released: February 26, 2001
- Recorded: 1966 – 1969, 1986 – 1987
- Genres: Rock, pop
- Label: WEA
- Producers: Tommy Boyce, Bobby Hart, Jack Keller, Jeff Barry, Michael Nesmith, Chip Douglas, Gerry Goffin, Carole King, Micky Dolenz, Davy Jones, Peter Tork, Michael Lloyd, Roger Bechirian, Felton Jarvis

The Monkees chronology
Music Box (2001)	The Definitive Monkees (2001)	Summer 1967: The Complete U.S. Concert Recordings (2001)

Professional ratings
Review scores
Source	Rating
Allmusic	4.5/5 stars

The Definitive Monkees is a limited edition Monkees compilation album released in 2001. It contains 29 of the Monkees' greatest hits. The album includes two tracks from the 1980s reunions. The album featured a bonus disc which featured 31 of The Monkees' rarity songs.

It has since been re-released in other countries, but the bonus disc was not included.

== Track listing ==
=== Disc one ===
1. "(Theme from) The Monkees" (Tommy Boyce, Bobby Hart) – 2:20
2. "Last Train to Clarksville" (Boyce, Hart) – 2:44
3. "Take a Giant Step" (Gerry Goffin, Carole King) – 2:31
4. "Saturday's Child" (David Gates) – 2:41
5. "I'm a Believer" (Neil Diamond) – 2:45
6. "I Wanna Be Free" (Album Version) (Boyce, Hart) – 2:24
7. "(I'm Not Your) Steppin' Stone" (Boyce, Hart) – 2:20
8. "She" (Boyce, Hart) – 2:37
9. "A Little Bit Me, A Little Bit You" (Diamond) – 2:48
10. "Mary, Mary" (Michael Nesmith) – 2:15
11. "The Girl I Knew Somewhere" (Nesmith) – 2:32
12. "Look Out (Here Comes Tomorrow)" (Diamond) – 2:13
13. "Shades of Gray" (Barry Mann, Cynthia Weil) – 3:20
14. "Sometime in the Morning" (Goffin, King) – 2:27
15. "For Pete's Sake" (Peter Tork, Joey Richards) – 2:09
16. "Forget That Girl" (Douglas Farthing Hatlelid) – 2:22
17. "Randy Scouse Git (Alternate Title)" (Micky Dolenz) – 2:35
18. "You Just May Be the One" (Nesmith) – 2:02
19. "Pleasant Valley Sunday" (Goffin, King) – 3:07
20. "Words" (Boyce, Hart) – 2:47
21. "Daydream Believer" (John Stewart) – 2:56
22. "Goin' Down" (Dolenz, Diane Hildebrand, Davy Jones, Nesmith, Tork) – 4:21
23. "What Am I Doing Hanging 'Round" (Michael Martin Murphey, Owen Castleman) – 3:04
24. "Cuddly Toy" (Harry Nilsson) – 2:37
25. "Valleri" (Boyce, Hart) – 2:20
26. "Porpoise Song (Theme from "Head")" (Goffin, King) – 4:09
27. "Listen to the Band" (Nesmith) – 2:31
28. "That Was Then, This Is Now (Vance Brescia) – 3:34
29. "Heart and Soul" (Simon Byrne, Andrew Howell) – 3:17

=== Bonus disc ===
1. "Tema Dei Monkees" (Boyce, Hart, Nistri) – 1:12
2. "So Goes Love" (Goffin, King) – 3:08
3. "Kicking Stones (Teeny Tiny Gnome)" (Wayne Erwin, Linda Castle) – 2:27
4. "Mr. Webster" (first recorded version) (Boyce, Hart) – 2:54
5. "Hold on Girl (Help is on its Way)" (first recorded version) (Billy Carr, Jack Keller, Ben Raleigh) – 2:44
6. "Apples, Peaches, Bananas and Pears" (Boyce, Hart) – 2:17
7. "Love to Love" (alternate mix) (Diamond) – 2:30
8. "Midnight Train" (demo version) (Dolenz) – 2:29
9. "She'll Be There" (Sharon Sheeley, Raul Abeyta) – 2:35
10. "Riu Chiu" (studio version) (Traditional) – 1:33
11. "Circle Sky" (alternate mix) (Nesmith) – 2:32
12. "Merry Go Round" (Hildebrand, Tork) – 1:44
13. "War Games" (Jones, Steve Pitts) – 2:32
14. "Seeger's Theme" (Seeger) – 0:45
15. "Party" (Jones, Pitts) – 2:44
16. "Shake 'Em Up (and Let 'Em Roll)" (Leiber & Stoller) – 2:10
17. "Rosemarie" (Dolenz) – 2:29
18. "Propinquity (I've Just Begun to Care)" (Nesmith) – 3:22
19. "Look Down" (King, Toni Stern) – 2:51
20. "The Crippled Lion" (Nesmith) – 2:51
21. "Hollywood" (Nesmith) – 2:17
22. "How Insensitive" (Antônio Carlos Jobim, Vinicius de Moraes, Norman Gimbel) – 2:32
23. "Down the Highway (Michigan Blackhawk)" (Goffin, King, Stern) – 2:15
24. "My Share of the Sidewalk" (Nesmith) – 3:07
25. "If You Have the Time" (Bill Chadwick, Jones) – 2:09
26. "Time and Time Again" (Chadwick, Jones) – 2:50
27. "Storybook of You" (Boyce, Hart) – 2:52
28. "You're So Good" (Robert Stone) – 2:41
29. "Steam Engine" (alternate mix) (Chip Douglas) – 2:24
30. "Angel Band" (William Bradbury, Jefferson Hascall, Traditional) – 3:25
31. "Little Red Rider" (Nesmith) – 3:17

=== Notes ===
- Several songs on the first disc, namely "Pleasant Valley Sunday", "Daydream Believer", "Listen to the Band", "That Was Then, This is Now" and "Heart and Soul" are presented in their single / shortened mixes, or else many of the tracks, such as "Cuddly Toy" have a sharper fade out than on most albums. This was probably done to fit 29 songs that otherwise would not have fit onto one disc.
- "Love to Love" is considered to be in an alternate mix, even though as of 2001 it is by far the most commonly used mix to date. The reason the mix is considered as such could be because it is a 1967 song featuring a Davy Jones vocal that was re-recorded in 1969, or it may have been remixed prior to release.
- "Teeny Tiny Gnome" is mislabeled. The correct title is "Kicking Stones", which can be found on the More of the Monkees Special Deluxe Edition, released in 2006.
- "Michigan Blackhawk" is a mistitled track; the song included here is a Gerry Goffin/Carole King country-rock tune, "Down The Highway", that Mike recorded in 1969; the mistitling comes from the use of the title "Michigan Blackhawk" on an unfinished Nesmith track from 1969.
- "Down The Highway" is erroneously credited to Michael Nesmith.
- "Down The Highway" is listed in the booklet as being recorded in 1968, despite being recorded in 1969, which could explain why it is placed with the 1968 tracks on the bonus disc. This error is also present in the booklet of the Missing Links Volume Two album it was first released on.
- "My Share of the Sidewalk" is listed in the booklet as being recorded in 1969, despite it being the 1968 version, which could explain why it is placed with the 1969 tracks on the bonus disc. This error is also present in the booklet of the Missing Links album it was first released on.
- "Angel Band" is in the public domain. The writing credit shown for Michael Nesmith is for the song's arrangement.
- The tracks "Little Red Rider" and "Hollywood" were re-recorded by Michael Nesmith for his solo album Magnetic South.
- "Midnight Train" and "She'll Be There" feature Micky Dolenz's sister, Coco Dolenz, singing harmony vocals.
- Micky and his sister Coco were responsible for the arrangement of the song "She'll Be There". However, the identity of the composer was unknown at the time of this release and, as a result, no official writer's credit was included.

== Charts ==
Chart performance for The Definitive Monkees
Chart (2001)	Peak position
Australian Albums (ARIA)	52
Norwegian Albums (VG-lista)	26
Scottish Albums (Official Charts)	16
UK Albums (Official Charts)	15

== Certifications ==
Region	Certification	Certified units/sales
Australia (ARIA)	Gold	35,000^{^}
^{^} Shipments figures based on certification alone.
