= 20th Anniversary Tour 1986 =

Live album by The Monkees
- Released: 1987, 1994
- Recorded: December 1 & 3, 1986
- Venues: Civic Center Arena, Charleston, West Virginia; Stabler Arena, Bethlehem, Pennsylvania
- Genre: Rock
- Length: 63:36
- Label: Rhino Records
- Producers: Davy Jones, Micky Dolenz, Peter Tork

The Monkees chronology
Then & Now... The Best of The Monkees (1986)	20th Anniversary Tour 1986 (1987)	Live 1967 (1987)

Alternative cover
- Cover of the 1994 CD release

20th Anniversary Tour 1986 is a live album by the Monkees recorded during their 20th anniversary tour in 1986. To date, it is the only known complete concert recorded during this era. The recording was available at 1987 tour stops in double-LP and cassette formats, though a planned 1988 retail release by Rhino Records was ultimately scrapped. The record credited the artists as Davy Jones, Micky Dolenz, Peter Tork to avoid paying royalties to Arista Records who owned the Monkees trademark at the time, though the band's logo is visible on the sleeve. A limited-edition CD was released in 1994 under the title Live! by the group's fan club in Nashville, and was sold at concerts during their 1996 tour.

Two of the album's tracks were used as B-sides on Monkees singles released in 1987 by Rhino Records. The Peter Tork-penned "MGBGT" backs "Heart and Soul", and is the only of the Monkees' U.S. singles to feature Tork as the sole lead vocalist. "(I'll) Love You Forever", written by Davy Jones, appears opposite "Every Step of the Way".

The album was recorded during the final two days of the Monkees' 1986 North American tour, at the Civic Center Arena in Charleston, West Virginia on December 1, and at Stabler Arena in Bethlehem, Pennsylvania on December 3. The idea of a tour to celebrate the Monkees' 20th anniversary came from promoter David Fishof. Initially, all four of the Monkees, including Mike Nesmith, agreed to a 20-date tour. While Tork and Jones were embarking on a warm-up tour in Australia, MTV unexpectedly ran a marathon of the Monkees' TV series, introducing the music to a new generation and persuading organizers to add over 100 dates to the tour. The expansion of the tour led Nesmith to bow out, and he appeared only for the encore at one show in Los Angeles. Ultimately, the 20th anniversary tour became one of the most profitable tours of 1986.

== Track listing ==
No.	Title	Lead vocals	Length
1.	"Last Train to Clarksville" (Tommy Boyce · Bobby Hart)	Micky Dolenz	3:30
2.	"A Little Bit Me, a Little Bit You" (Neil Diamond)	Davy Jones	2:38
3.	"(I'm Not Your) Steppin' Stone" (Boyce · Hart)	Micky Dolenz	2:55
4.	"Cuddly Toy" (Harry Nilsson)	Davy Jones	3:15
5.	"Goin' Down" (Diane Hildebrand · Dolenz · Tork · Jones · Michael Nesmith)	Micky Dolenz	4:10
6.	"Pleasant Valley Sunday" (Carole King · Gerry Goffin)	Micky Dolenz	3:06
7.	"I Wanna Be Free" (Boyce · Hart)	Davy Jones	3:53
8.	"Your Auntie Grizelda" (Jack Keller · Diane Hildebrand)	Peter Tork	3:32
9.	"She" (Boyce · Hart)	Micky Dolenz	3:03
10.	"For Pete's Sake" (Tork · Joey Richards)	Peter Tork	3:29
11.	"That Was Then, This Is Now" (Vance Brescia)	Micky Dolenz	3:55
12.	"Shades of Gray" (Barry Mann · Cynthia Weil)	Peter Tork	2:57
13.	"Look Out (Here Comes Tomorrow)" (Diamond)	Davy Jones	2:30
14.	"No Time" (Hank Cicalo)	Micky Dolenz, Peter Tork, Davy Jones	1:30
15.	"Daydream Believer" (John Stewart)	Davy Jones	2:42
16.	"Listen to the Band" (Nesmith)	Peter Tork, Micky Dolenz, Davy Jones	2:00
17.	"Randy Scouse Git" (Dolenz)	Micky Dolenz	3:17
18.	"I'll Love You Forever" (Jones)	Davy Jones	2:30
19.	"MGBGT" (Tork)	Peter Tork	2:29
20.	"Valleri" (Boyce · Hart)	Davy Jones	2:28
21.	"I'm a Believer" (Diamond)	Micky Dolenz	3:27
22.	"(theme from) The Monkees" (Boyce · Hart)	Micky Dolenz	1:00

== Personnel ==
The Monkees

- Davy Jones – vocals, percussion
- Micky Dolenz – vocals, electronic drums, rhythm guitar
- Peter Tork – vocals, lead and rhythm guitars, banjo

Backing band

- Dusty Hanvey – lead and rhythm guitars
- Mark Clarke – bass
- Larry Nelson – keyboards
- Eddie Zyne – drums
- John Leslie – saxophone
- Kevin Osborne – trombone
- Lon Seaman – trumpet
- Jim O'Connor – trumpet

=== Production staff ===
Sources:

- Davy Jones – producer
- Micky Dolenz – producer
- Peter Tork – producer, mixing
- Mark Clarke – mixing
- Patti Joblon – production coordinator
- Jay Messina – live recording engineer, mix engineer
- Greg Calbi – mastering engineer
- Frank Pekoc – assistant engineer
- Steve Marcantonio – additional engineering
- Michael G. Bush – cover photos (1987 release)
- Henry Diltz – cover photo (1994 release)

Mixed at Record Plant Studios in New York City.

Mastered at Sterling Sound in New York City.
