= The Monkees Greatest Hits =

Greatest hits album by the Monkees
- Released: July 1976
- Recorded: 1966–1969
- Genre: Pop rock
- Length: 30:51
- Label: Arista
- Producer: Various

The Monkees chronology
Re-Focus (1972)	The Monkees Greatest Hits (1976)	Monkeemania (40 Timeless Hits) (1979)

Professional ratings
Review scores
Source	Rating
AllMusic	4.5/5 stars
The Rolling Stone Album Guide	3.5/5 stars

The Monkees Greatest Hits is a 1976 greatest hits compilation album of songs by the Monkees released by Arista Records and a reissue of an earlier Bell Records compilation, Re-Focus.

While the Monkees were among the top-selling bands of the mid-1960s, their decline was sharp, and their last new albums and singles sold poorly. Earlier greatest hits collections (the first two from their original label, Colgems Records) had seen only limited release and were hard to find in stores. (The first compilation was also called The Monkees Greatest Hits, but its track listing was very different.) Several of the Monkees' hits had become radio staples, though, and with the sale of their television series into syndication in 1975, they found a new audience on daytime TV. Popular demand from old and new Monkees fans prompted the album's release.

The cover included a photo of the group on the front and a still from the show on the back. The songs were an all-stereo mix of both hit singles and album tracks featured in the series, with the exception of "Listen to the Band" which was not featured in the original series and was first heard (in a different live version) on 1969's post-series Monkees TV special 33 1/3 Revolutions Per Monkee. (The single version of "Listen to the Band" was dubbed into a rerun episode of The Monkees during its time airing on Saturday afternoons.) Of the group's first six A-sides, only "Valleri" does not appear, although that and several successful B-sides would later show up on 1982's More Greatest Hits of the Monkees.

The album became a best-seller and remained available through the 1980s, with cassette and compact disc editions also appearing.

When Rhino Records reissued the entire Monkees catalog during 1995, this and all previous Monkees compilations were deleted. In early 2019, however, this album returned to print in vinyl format.

== Track listing ==
1. "(Theme from) The Monkees" (Tommy Boyce, Bobby Hart)
2. "Last Train to Clarksville" (Boyce, Hart)
3. "She" (Boyce, Hart)
4. "Daydream Believer" (John Stewart)
5. "Listen to the Band" (Michael Nesmith)
6. "A Little Bit Me, a Little Bit You" (Neil Diamond)
7. "I'm a Believer" (Neil Diamond)
8. "I Wanna Be Free" (Boyce, Hart)
9. "Pleasant Valley Sunday" (Gerry Goffin, Carole King)
10. "(I'm Not Your) Steppin' Stone" (Boyce, Hart)
11. "Shades of Gray" (Barry Mann, Cynthia Weil)

== Charts ==
Original album
Chart (1976)	Peak position
Australian Albums (Kent Music Report)	55
US Billboard 200	58

== Certifications ==
Region	Certification	Certified units/sales
United States (RIAA)	Platinum	1,000,000^{^}
^{^} Shipments figures based on certification alone.
