= Live 1967 (The Monkees album) =

Live album by the Monkees
- Released: June 1987
- Recorded: August 25–27, 1967
- Venues: Seattle Center Coliseum (Seattle, Washington) The Coliseum (Spokane, Washington) Memorial Coliseum (Portland, Oregon)
- Genre: Pop rock
- Length: 58:30
- Label: Rhino
- Producer: Bert Schneider - Bob Rafelson

The Monkees chronology
20th Anniversary Tour 1986 (1987)	Live 1967 (1987)	Missing Links (1987)

Professional ratings
Review scores
Source	Rating
AllMusic	3.5/5 stars

Live 1967 is a live album by the American pop rock band the Monkees, released in 1987 by Rhino Records. The album was compiled from show dates in Seattle, Portland and Spokane on their 1967 United States tour. The songs mostly feature the Monkees themselves singing and playing, although the "solo spots" for each member feature music by opening act the Sundowners.

In 2001, Rhino Handmade released all recordings from these shows—as well as a date in Mobile, Alabama—as a limited edition CD: Summer 1967: The Complete U.S. Concert Recordings.

During these dates, Davy Jones and Kim Capli of the Sundowners went by themselves to a local recording studio to make "Hard to Believe", which was included on the Monkees' album Pisces, Aquarius, Capricorn, & Jones, Ltd. (1967).

== Track listing ==
CD version
No.	Title	Lead vocals	Length
1.	"Last Train to Clarksville" (Tommy Boyce, Bobby Hart)	Micky Dolenz	3:41
2.	"You Just May Be the One" (Michael Nesmith)	Nesmith	2:10
3.	"The Girl I Knew Somewhere" (Nesmith)	Dolenz	3:26
4.	"I Wanna Be Free" (Boyce, Hart)	Davy Jones	3:01
5.	"Sunny Girlfriend" (Nesmith)	Nesmith	2:32
6.	"Your Auntie Grizelda" (Diane Hildebrand, Jack Keller)	Peter Tork	2:39
7.	"Forget That Girl" (Chip Douglas)	Jones	2:19
8.	"Sweet Young Thing" (Gerry Goffin, Carole King, Nesmith)	Nesmith	2:35
9.	"Mary, Mary" (Nesmith)	Dolenz	5:09
10.	"Cripple Creek" (Trad.)	Tork solo spot, featuring the Sundowners	3:20
11.	"You Can't Judge a Book by Looking at the Cover" (Willie Dixon)	Nesmith solo spot, featuring the Sundowners	4:35
12.	"Gonna Build a Mountain" (Anthony Newley, Leslie Bricusse)	Jones solo spot, featuring the Sundowners	3:34
13.	"I Got a Woman" (Ray Charles, Renald Richard)	Dolenz solo spot, featuring the Sundowners	7:49
14.	"I'm a Believer" (Neil Diamond)	Dolenz	3:27
15.	"Randy Scouse Git" (Dolenz)	Dolenz	3:02
16.	"(I'm Not Your) Steppin' Stone" (Boyce, Hart)	Dolenz	5:11

- Tracks 10, 11, 12 and 13 are bonus tracks, available only on the 1988 Rhino CD and 2016 Friday Music LP.

== Personnel ==
Credits adapted from Rhino 1988 CD, except where noted.

The Monkees

- Mike Nesmith – lead guitar, harmonica, vocals
- Peter Tork – bass guitar, keyboards, banjo, vocals
- Davy Jones – tambourine, vocals
- Micky Dolenz – drums, vocals

The Sundowners

- Eddie Brick – percussion (10–13)
- Eddie Placidi – rhythm guitar (10–13)
- Dom DeMieri – lead guitar (10–13)
- Kim Capli – drums, keyboards (10–13)
- Bobby Dick – bass guitar (10–13)

Technical

- Bert Schneider – producer
- Bob Rafelson – producer
- Bill Inglot – mixdown producer, compact disc preparation
- Hank Cicalo – recording engineer
- Dan Matovina – remix engineer
- John Strother – remix engineer
- Don Brown – art direction
- Lisa Sutton – design
- Henry Diltz – photographs
- Winton D. Teel – photographs
- Caprice Carmona – production assistant
- Ken Perry – compact disc preparation
