= Dolenz, Jones, Boyce & Hart =

1976 album

Dolenz, Jones, Boyce & Hart was a supergroup, consisting of songwriting/performing duo Boyce and Hart and two members of the Monkees, Micky Dolenz and Davy Jones. Boyce and Hart had written many of the Monkees' biggest hits, such as "Last Train to Clarksville" and "(Theme From) The Monkees". The group existed only for a short time in 1976, recording one eponymous album.

== Background ==
The group was called Dolenz, Jones, Boyce & Hart because they were legally prohibited from using the name "The Monkees". Former Monkees members Michael Nesmith and Peter Tork—both of whom had left the Monkees before their final album, Changes (1970)—were also invited to join the supergroup, but both declined.

Dolenz and Jones had been the only two members of the Monkees to contribute to Changes. As such, and because of Boyce and Hart's close songwriting ties to the Monkees, several publications, such as Allmusic, consider Dolenz, Jones, Boyce & Hart to be a de facto Monkees reunion album, without the rights to the Monkees name. Most of the musicians that appear on the album were featured on Monkees albums in the past. A majority of the vocals are performed by Dolenz and Jones, with Boyce and Hart contributing backing vocals and the occasional lead vocal, such as Hart on "I Love You (And I'm Glad That I Said It)". Although the album failed to make much of an impact when originally released, renewal of interest in the Monkees led to its reissue on compact disc in 2005.

During their concert tour promoting the album, Tork joined Dolenz, Jones, Boyce & Hart onstage for a guest appearance at Disneyland on July 4, 1976. Later that year, Tork reunited with Jones and Dolenz in the studio for the recording of the single "Christmas Is My Time of the Year" b/w "White Christmas", which saw a limited release for fan club members that holiday season. A promotional live album, Concert in Japan, was released in 1981.

== Dolenz, Jones, Boyce & Hart ==
Dolenz, Jones, Boyce & Hart

Studio album by Dolenz, Jones, Boyce & Hart
- Released: May 29, 1976
- Genre: Pop rock
- Length: 38:33
- Label: Capitol
- Producer: Tommy Boyce, Bobby Hart

=== Track listing ===
| No. | Title | Writer(s) | Lead vocals | Length |
|---|---|---|---|---|
| 1. | "Right Now" | Tommy Boyce, Bobby Hart | Davy Jones | 2:46 |
| 2. | "I Love You (And I'm Glad That I Said It)" | Boyce, Hart | Bobby Hart | 3:09 |
| 3. | "You and I" | Micky Dolenz, Davy Jones | Micky Dolenz | 2:46 |
| 4. | "Teenager in Love" | Doc Pomus, Mort Shuman | Micky Dolenz | 3:00 |
| 5. | "Sail On Sailor" | Doug Trevor | Davy Jones & Bobby Hart with Micky Dolenz | 3:44 |
| 6. | "It Always Hurts the Most in the Morning" | Boyce, Dolenz | Tommy Boyce, Micky Dolenz & Bobby Hart | 3:30 |
| 7. | "Moonfire" | William E. Martin | Micky Dolenz | 3:31 |
| 8. | "You Didn't Feel That Way Last Night (Don't You Remember)" | Boyce, Hart | Micky Dolenz | 2:25 |
| 9. | "Along Came Jones" | Leiber, Stoller | Micky Dolenz & Bobby Hart with Davy Jones | 3:32 |
| 10. | "Savin' My Love for You" | Dolenz, Jones | Micky Dolenz | 3:24 |
| 11. | "I Remember the Feeling" | Boyce, Hart | Davy Jones & Micky Dolenz | 3:23 |
| 12. | "Sweet Heart Attack" | Boyce, Hart | Micky Dolenz | 3:07 |

=== Personnel ===
- Micky Dolenz – vocals, guitar, percussion, drums, keyboards
- Davy Jones – vocals
- Tommy Boyce – vocals, guitar
- Bobby Hart – vocals, keyboards

Additional musicians

- Henry Diltz – banjo
- Skip Edwards – keyboards
- Joey Carbone – keyboards
- Neil Norman – guitar, Moog synthesizer
- Chip Douglas – guitar
- Cyrus Faryar – guitar
- Jerry Yester – guitar
- Louie Shelton – guitar
- Jeffrey Staton – guitar
- Michael Staton – guitar
- Keith Allison – bass
- Jerry Summers – drums
- Jim Helmer – drums
- Emil Richards – percussion
- Daniel Catherine – effects

Technical

- Tommy Boyce – producer
- Bobby Hart – producer
- Jimmie Haskell – string arrangements
- David Hassinger – engineer
- Sergio Reye – engineer
- Ron Hicklin – vocal director
- Larry Michael White – photography

== Concert in Japan ==
Concert in Japan

Live album by Dolenz, Jones, Boyce & Hart
- Released: August 1981
- Recorded: July 20, 1976
- Venue: Yubin Chokin Hall, Tokyo, Japan
- Genre: Pop rock
- Length: 45:01
- Label: Capitol Records / Toshiba EMI
- Producer: Tommy Boyce, Bobby Hart

=== Track listing ===
| No. | Title | Writer(s) | Length |
|---|---|---|---|
| 1. | "Last Train to Clarksville" | Tommy Boyce, Bobby Hart | 2:48 |
| 2. | "Medley: Valleri / Daydream Believer / A Little Bit Me, A Little Bit You" | Boyce, Hart / John Stewart / Neil Diamond | 5:03 |
| 3. | "I Wonder What She's Doing Tonight?" | Boyce, Hart | 2:59 |
| 4. | "(I'm Not Your) Steppin' Stone" | Boyce, Hart | 2:50 |
| 5. | "I Wanna Be Free" | Boyce, Hart | 2:41 |
| 6. | "Savin' My Love for You" | Micky Dolenz, Davy Jones | 3:04 |
| 7. | "Pleasant Valley Sunday" | Gerry Goffin, Carole King | 3:35 |
| 8. | "I Remember the Feeling" | Boyce, Hart | 3:41 |
| 9. | "A Teenager in Love" | Doc Pomus, Mort Shuman | 2:50 |
| 10. | "Cuddly Toy" | Harry Nilsson | 2:13 |
| 11. | "Medley: Come a Little Bit Closer / Pretty Little Angel Eyes / Hurt So Bad / Peaches 'n' Cream / Something's Wrong With Me / Keep on Singing" | Boyce, Hart, Wes Farrell / Boyce, Curtis Lee / Hart, Teddy Randazzo, Bobby Weinstein / Boyce, Steve Venet / Hart, Danny Janssen / Hart, Janssen | 5:35 |
| 12. | "I Love You (And I'm Glad That I Said It)" | Boyce, Hart | 3:16 |
| 13. | "Action" | Boyce, Venet | 4:26 |

=== Personnel ===
- Micky Dolenz – vocals, guitar
- Davy Jones – vocals
- Tommy Boyce – vocals, guitar
- Bobby Hart – vocals

Additional musicians

- Keith Allison – guitar, vocals (lead on "Action")
- Steve Johnson – keyboards
- Rick Tierny – bass
- Jerry Summers – drums

Technical

- Micky Dolenz – producer
- Davy Jones – producer
- Tommy Boyce – producer
- Bobby Hart – producer
- John Palladino – executive producer
