= Take a Giant Step (song) =

- US single

Single by The Monkees

from the album The Monkees
- A-side: "Last Train to Clarksville"
- Released: 16 August 1966
- Recorded: 9 July 1966
- Studio: RCA Victor (Hollywood, California)
- Genre: Pop rock
- Length: 2:31
- Label: Colgems 1001
- Songwriters: Gerry Goffin; Carole King
- Producers: Tommy Boyce; Bobby Hart

"Take a Giant Step" is a song written by Gerry Goffin and Carole King, and first released by the American pop rock band the Monkees in 1966.

== History ==
The song was released as the B-side to the band's first single, "Last Train to Clarksville", and later appeared as the closing track on side one of their debut album. Micky Dolenz performed lead vocals.

The song is presented as a plea to a heartbroken girl to move on from her past romantic disappointments, and to "learn to live again at last", by "taking a giant step outside your mind". Critic Eric Lefcowitz describes the song as "proto-psychedelic". The song features a main lyric and a counterpoint, both of which Micky sang; Davy Jones later repeated that on "When Love Comes Knockin' (At Your Door)".

Fountain of Youth released a version of the song in June 1968 on the Monkees' own Colgems label, featuring a different arrangement.

The song was later covered by singer Taj Mahal, in a significantly rearranged version, and included as the title track to his 1969 double album release Giant Step/De Ole Folks at Home. It was also recorded by Rising Sons—featuring Mahal and Ry Cooder—in 1966, but not released until 1992 on their self-titled album.

The song was also covered by Bobby Sherman in the March 20, 1970, episode of the television series Here Come the Brides, titled "Absalom".

In 1994, Monkees member Peter Tork released a folk version on his debut solo album Stranger Things Have Happened. Nina Hagen released a German version of the song (titled "Riesenschritt") on her 1995 album FreuD euch.
