= List of Record World number-one albums of 1967 =

These are the Record World number-one albums of 1967.

== Chart history ==
Issue date	Album	Artist(s)	Label
January 7	S.R.O	Herb Alpert & The Tijuana Brass	
January 14	The Monkees	The Monkees	Colgems
January 21	The Monkees	The Monkees	Colgems
January 28	The Monkees	The Monkees	Colgems
February 4	The Monkees	The Monkees	Colgems
February 11	The Monkees	The Monkees	Colgems
February 18	More of The Monkees	The Monkees	Colgems
February 25	More of The Monkees	The Monkees	Colgems
March 4	More of The Monkees	The Monkees	Colgems
March 11	More of The Monkees	The Monkees	Colgems
March 18	More of The Monkees	The Monkees	Colgems
March 25	More of The Monkees	The Monkees	Colgems
April 1	More of The Monkees	The Monkees	Colgems
April 8	More of The Monkees	The Monkees	Colgems
April 15	More of The Monkees	The Monkees	Colgems
April 22	More of The Monkees	The Monkees	Colgems
April 29	The Mamas & Papas Deliver	The Mama's & Papa's	
May 6	The Mamas & Papas Deliver	The Mama's & Papa's	
May 13	More Of The Monkees	The Monkees	Colgems
May 20	More Of The Monkees	The Monkees	Colgems
May 27	More Of The Monkees	The Monkees	Colgems
June 3	Revenge	Bill Cosby	
June 10	I've Never Loved A Man The Way I Love You	Aretha Franklin	
June 17	Sounds Like...	Herb Alpert and the Tijuana Brass	A&M
June 24	Sounds Like...	Herb Alpert and the Tijuana Brass	A&M
July 1	Headquarters	The Monkees	Colgems
July 8	Sgt. Pepper's Lonely Hearts Club Band	The Beatles	Capitol
July 15	Sgt. Pepper's Lonely Hearts Club Band	The Beatles	Capitol
July 22	Sgt. Pepper's Lonely Hearts Club Band	The Beatles	Capitol
July 29	Sgt. Pepper's Lonely Hearts Club Band	The Beatles	Capitol
August 5	Sgt. Pepper's Lonely Hearts Club Band	The Beatles	Capitol
August 12	Sgt. Pepper's Lonely Hearts Club Band	The Beatles	Capitol
August 19	Sgt. Pepper's Lonely Hearts Club Band	The Beatles	Capitol
August 26	Sgt. Pepper's Lonely Hearts Club Band	The Beatles	Capitol
September 2	Sgt. Pepper's Lonely Hearts Club Band	The Beatles	Capitol
September 9	Sgt. Pepper's Lonely Hearts Club Band	The Beatles	Capitol
September 16	Sgt. Pepper's Lonely Hearts Club Band	The Beatles	Capitol
September 23	Sgt. Pepper's Lonely Hearts Club Band	The Beatles	Capitol
September 30	Sgt. Pepper's Lonely Hearts Club Band	The Beatles	Capitol
October 7	Ode to Billie Joe	Bobbie Gentry	Capitol
October 14	Ode to Billie Joe	Bobbie Gentry	Capitol
October 21	Ode to Billie Joe	Bobbie Gentry	Capitol
October 28	Ode to Billie Joe	Bobbie Gentry	Capitol
November 4	Diana Ross & the Supremes: Greatest Hits	The Supremes	Motown
November 11	Diana Ross & the Supremes: Greatest Hits	The Supremes	Motown
November 18	Diana Ross & the Supremes: Greatest Hits	The Supremes	Motown
November 25	Diana Ross & the Supremes: Greatest Hits	The Supremes	Motown
December 2	Diana Ross & the Supremes: Greatest Hits	The Supremes	Motown
December 9	Pisces, Aquarius, Capricorn & Jones Ltd.	The Monkees	Colgems
December 16	Pisces, Aquarius, Capricorn & Jones Ltd.	The Monkees	Colgems
December 23	Pisces, Aquarius, Capricorn & Jones Ltd.	The Monkees	Colgems
December 30	Pisces, Aquarius, Capricorn & Jones Ltd.	The Monkees	Colgems
