= The Monkees Greatest Hits (Colgems) =

Greatest Hits

Greatest hits album by the Monkees
- Released: June 9, 1969
- Recorded: 1966–1969
- Genre: Pop rock
- Label: Colgems
- Producers: Chip Douglas, The Monkees, Jeff Barry, Boyce and Hart, Michael Nesmith

The Monkees chronology
Instant Replay (1969)	Greatest Hits (1969)	The Monkees Present (1969)

The Monkees Greatest Hits is the first greatest hits compilation album by the American pop rock band the Monkees, released in 1969 by Colgems Records.

Greatest Hits was issued by RCA Records in an attempt to revive interest in the band prior to the return of their television series. It peaked at number 89 on the Billboard 200 album charts for the week of July 26.

It is the only original Monkees album not to feature any photographs of the group on either the front or back covers. The album was reissued on 180-gram vinyl by Friday Music in 2012.

== Track listing ==
Side one

1. "Daydream Believer" (John Stewart) – 2:58
2. "Pleasant Valley Sunday" (Gerry Goffin, Carole King) – 3:10
3. "Cuddly Toy" (Harry Nilsson) – 2:45
4. "Shades of Gray" (Barry Mann, Cynthia Weil) – 3:20
5. "Zor and Zam" (Bill Chadwick, John Chadwick) – 2:08
6. "A Little Bit Me, A Little Bit You" (Neil Diamond) – 2:35
7. "She" (Tommy Boyce, Bobby Hart) – 2:27

Side two

1. "Randy Scouse Git" (Micky Dolenz) – 2:35
2. "I Wanna Be Free" (Boyce, Hart) – 2:24
3. "I'm a Believer" (Diamond) – 2:41
4. "Valleri" (Boyce, Hart) – 2:16
5. "Mary Mary" (Michael Nesmith) – 2:12
6. "(I'm Not Your) Steppin' Stone" (Boyce, Hart) – 2:25
7. "Last Train to Clarksville" (Boyce, Hart) – 2:40

== Unreleased follow-up compilation ==
RCA/Colgems assembled a follow-up compilation, but it was never issued. The track line-up would have been as follows:

Side one

1. "(Theme From) The Monkees"
2. "Porpoise Song (Theme from Head)"
3. "Someday Man"
4. "Good Clean Fun"
5. "Oh My My"
6. "What Am I Doing Hangin' 'Round?"
7. "D.W. Washburn"

Side two

1. "For Pete's Sake"
2. "Listen to the Band"
3. "It's Nice to Be with You"
4. "The Girl I Knew Somewhere"
5. "Tear Drop City"
6. "Long Title: Do I Have to Do This All Over Again"
7. "Goin' Down"

== Charts ==
Original album
Chart (1969)	Peak position
US Billboard 200	69
