= List of Canadian number-one albums of 1967 =

This list contains the albums ranking number one in Canada in 1967.

== Albums ==
Week	Title	Artist	Ref
January 2 1967	The Monkees	The Monkees	
January 14 1967	The Monkees	The Monkees	
January 21 1967	More of the Monkees	The Monkees	
January 28 1967	More of the Monkees	The Monkees	
February 4 1967	The Monkees	The Monkees	
February 11 1967	The Monkees	The Monkees	
February 18 1967	The Monkees	The Monkees	
February 25 1967	More of the Monkees	The Monkees	
March 4 1967	More of the Monkees	The Monkees	
March 11 1967	More of the Monkees	The Monkees	
March 18 1967	More of the Monkees	The Monkees	
March 25 1967	More of the Monkees	The Monkees	
April 1 1967	More of the Monkees	The Monkees	
April 8 1967	More of the Monkees	The Monkees	
April 15 1967	More of the Monkees	The Monkees	
April 22 1967	More of the Monkees	The Monkees	
April 29 1967	The Mamas & Papas Deliver	Mamas & Papas	
May 6 1967	The Mamas & Papas Deliver	Mamas & Papas	
May 13 1967	The Mamas & Papas Deliver	Mamas & Papas	
May 20 1967	The Mamas & Papas Deliver	Mamas & Papas	
May 27 1967	More of the Monkees	The Monkees	
June 3 1967	More of the Monkees	The Monkees	
June 10 1967	More of the Monkees	The Monkees	
June 17 1967	More of the Monkees	The Monkees	
June 24 1967	Monkees Headquarters	The Monkees	
July 1 1967	Monkees Headquarters	The Monkees	
July 8 1967	Monkees Headquarters	The Monkees	
July 15 1967	Sgt. Pepper's Lonely Hearts Club Band	The Beatles	
July 22 1967	Sgt. Pepper's Lonely Hearts Club Band	The Beatles	
July 29 1967	Sgt. Pepper's Lonely Hearts Club Band	The Beatles	
August 5 1967	Sgt. Pepper's Lonely Hearts Club Band	The Beatles	
August 12 1967	Sgt. Pepper's Lonely Hearts Club Band	The Beatles	
August 19 1967	Sgt. Pepper's Lonely Hearts Club Band	The Beatles	
August 26 1967	Sgt. Pepper's Lonely Hearts Club Band	The Beatles	
September 2 1967	Sgt. Pepper's Lonely Hearts Club Band	The Beatles	
September 9 1967	Sgt. Pepper's Lonely Hearts Club Band	The Beatles	
September 16 1967	Sgt. Pepper's Lonely Hearts Club Band	The Beatles	
September 23 1967	Sgt. Pepper's Lonely Hearts Club Band	The Beatles	
September 30 1967	Sgt. Pepper's Lonely Hearts Club Band	The Beatles	
October 7 1967	Sgt. Pepper's Lonely Hearts Club Band	The Beatles	
