= I'm Gonna Buy Me a Dog =

Song by The Astronauts

from the album Rarities
- Released: 1991
- Recorded: June 7, 1965
- Studio: RCA Studio B, Hollywood
- Label: Bear Family
- Songwriters: Tommy Boyce, Bobby Hart
- Producer: Al Schmitt

"I'm Gonna Buy Me a Dog" is a novelty song written by Tommy Boyce and Bobby Hart. It was first recorded by The Astronauts in 1965, though their version was not released at the time. Bear Family Records included the track on the 1991 Astronauts Rarities CD compilation. Boyce contributed percussion and vocals to the track, while Hart played piano. The song was later recorded by The Monkees as "Gonna Buy Me a Dog" in 1966.

== Background ==
The lyrics to "Gonna Buy Me a Dog" were described by Andrew Sandoval as "intentionally banal". Hart said "The song itself could hardly be construed as ever being straight."

== Gamma Goochee Himself's version ==
"I'm Gonna Buy Me a Dog"

Song by Gamma Goochee Himself
- A-side: "(You Got) The Gamma Goochee"
- Released: October 1965
- Length: 2:25
- Label: Colpix
- Songwriters: Tommy Boyce, Bobby Hart
- Producers: Boyce & Hart for Screen Gems

The first released version of "I'm Gonna Buy Me a Dog" was recorded by dental technician John Mangiagli using the stage name Gamma Goochee Himself. Gamma Goochee's version was released as the B-side of "(You Got) The Gamma Goochee" on Colpix Records in 1965. In a 2001 interview, Mangiagli recalled the backing track had already been prepared when he recorded the song.

== The Monkees' version ==
"Gonna Buy Me a Dog"

Song by The Monkees

from the album The Monkees
- Released: October 1966
- Recorded: July 23–24, 1966
- Studio: RCA Studio A, Hollywood: Western Recorders, Los Angeles
- Genre: Novelty
- Length: 2:41
- Label: Colgems
- Songwriters: Tommy Boyce, Bobby Hart
- Producers: Tommy Boyce, Bobby Hart

On July 7, 1966, Michael Nesmith produced the first version of The Monkees' "Gonna Buy Me a Dog" at Western Recorders. During the session, ten takes of the backing track were recorded, which went unreleased at the time. Sandoval described the Nesmith-produced version of the track as having a "rocking, bluesy arrangement" and added, "[T]oday's results sound rather like another 'dog' hit from a few years back: Rufus Thomas's 'Walking The Dog.'" Peter Tork was one of five guitarists who played guitar during the session, which also produced "So Goes Love" and an early version of "Papa Gene's Blues". (Note: Sandoval mistakenly credits Davy Jones as providing a vocal for the first version of "I'm Gonna Buy Me a Dog". The body text of the July 7, 1966 entry states that Jones entered the session during the recording of "So Goes Love".)

A few weeks later, Boyce and Hart produced their own version of "Gonna Buy Me a Dog" for The Monkees. The backing track was recorded on July 23 at RCA Studio A. Don Kirshner visited the session and said to Hart, "Bobby, you see the thing is, it's a funny tune. I mean, if we're going to get funny, we might as well be funny and different." The next day, Micky Dolenz and Davy Jones added their vocals to the song at Western Recorders near the end of an eight-hour vocal overdub session. Prior to becoming a member of The Monkees, Jones had performed "Gonna Buy Me a Dog" on an episode of The Farmer's Daughter. Dolenz and Jones contributed several adlibs, which included a brief conversation during the guitar solo. Jones references Napoleon XIV's "They're Coming to Take Me Away, Ha-Haaa!" during the fade out. Hart said of the vocal session, "They didn't understand the song; they thought it was real stupid. They were just basically making fun of it. [...] We thought it was great and we kept the jokes in. They had some input on it. They didn't just walk in and do what they were told. There was some creativity involved."

=== Release and critical reception ===
The Boyce and Hart-produced version of "Gonna Buy Me a Dog" appeared as the last track on the Monkees' self-titled debut album in October. Regarding the song's inclusion on the album, Hart stated, "We were trying to follow the whole Beatles formula all the way. [...] We wanted to have one novelty number in there like Ringo's obligatory novelty piece on every Beatles record."

Mary O'Leary of the Arlington Heights Herald praised the song, calling it "a hilarious bit of cutting up between Micky and Davey [sic]". In a retrospective review of The Monkees album, Tim Sendra of AllMusic described the song as a "throwaway", but also called it "charming". Matthew Greenwald of AllMusic called the song "a funny end to an album and group that certainly wasn't supposed to be taken seriously, at least yet."

The Monkees' version of "Gonna Buy Me a Dog" reached #3 on Billboard's Hits of the World chart for Mexico in November 1967.

=== Personnel ===
Per Andrew Sandoval.

The Monkees

- Micky Dolenz - vocals
- Davy Jones - vocals

Other musicians

- Gerry McGee - guitar
- Wayne Erwin - guitar
- Louie Shelton - guitar
- Larry Taylor - bass
- Billy Lewis - drums
- Bobby Hart - organ

== In popular culture ==
Davy Jones performed "Gonna Buy Me a Dog" in the sixteenth episode of the third season of The Farmer's Daughter, "Moe Hill and the Mountains", which aired on January 7, 1966.

The Monkees' version of "Gonna Buy Me a Dog" later appeared in the twelfth episode of the first season of The Monkees, "I've Got a Little Song Here", which aired on November 28, 1966. An instrumental version of the song appeared in the second-to-last episode of the series, "Monkees Blow Their Minds".
