= The Headquarters Sessions =

2000 box set by The Monkees

Compilation album by The Monkees
- Released: September 21, 2000
- Recorded: January 16, 23, 30–31, February 23–24, and March 2–4, 7–11, 14, 16–19, 22–23, 28–30, 1967
- Studios: RCA Victor A, B and C (Hollywood)
- Genre: Rock
- Label: Rhino Handmade
- Producers: Douglas Farthing Hatlelid, Roland Worthington Hand, Andrew Sandoval

The Monkees chronology
The Monkees Anthology (1998)	The Headquarters Sessions (2000)	Music Box (2001)

Professional ratings
Review scores
Source	Rating
AllMusic	4/5 stars

The Headquarters Sessions is a compilation album by the American pop rock band the Monkees, released in 2000 by Rhino Handmade. It contains 84 tracks on three CDs, including 60 previously unreleased recordings from the sessions that produced the band's third album, Headquarters (1967).

The set includes recordings from sessions where the band exercised creative control over all aspects of the recording process and where they played most of the instruments. All vocal masters from the sessions that were not included on the original stereo album are included, as well as the surviving vocal demos and a few tracks with vocals which were never completed. In addition, the original mono masters are presented in an initially proposed, but ultimately unused, running order.

The packaging contained a gatefold digipack with a 40-page booklet including photographs and detailed liner notes written by Andrew Sandoval and Bill Inglot. The Headquarters Sessions was a limited edition release of 4,500 units.

== Track listing ==
Disc one

1. "She's So Far Out, She's In" (Tracking Session Takes 1 and 2)
2. "The Girl I Knew Somewhere" (First Version) (Tracking Session Composite Takes 1 to 16)
3. "The Girl I Knew Somewhere" (First Version) (Master Backing Track Take 22)
4. "All of Your Toys" (Rehearsal)
5. "All of Your Toys" (Tracking Session Composite Takes 1 to 10)
6. "All of Your Toys" (Master Backing Track Take 20 Mono Mix)
7. "The Girl I Knew Somewhere" (Second Version) (Tracking Session Composite Featuring Take 15)
8. "The Girl I Knew Somewhere" (Second Version) (Tracking Overdub Session Takes 1 and 2)
9. "The Girl I Knew Somewhere" (Second Version) (Master Backing Track Take 13A)
10. "Seeger's Theme" (Demo)
11. "Can You Dig It?" (Demo)
12. "Nine Times Blue" (Demo Vocal)
13. "Until It's Time for You to Go" (Demo Vocal)
14. "She'll Be There" (Demo Vocal)
15. "Midnight Train" (Demo Vocal)
16. "Sunny Girlfriend" (Acoustic Remix of Master Vocal)
17. "Sunny Girlfriend" (Tracking Session Take 7 With Scratch Vocal)
18. "Mr. Webster" (Tracking Session Take 28)
19. "Band 6" (Stereo Master)
20. "Setting Up the Studio for 'Randy Scouse Git'"
21. "Randy Scouse Git" (Tracking Session Composite)
22. "Randy Scouse Git" (Alternate Version Take 18 Vocal)
23. "You Told Me" (Master Backing Track)
24. "Monkee Chat" (Studio Dialogue)

Disc two

1. "You Told Me" (Take 15 With Rough Lead Vocal)
2. "Zilch" (Peter Tork Vocal Track)
3. "Zilch" (Davy Jones Vocal Track)
4. "Zilch" (Micky Dolenz Vocal Track)
5. "Zilch" (Michael Nesmith Vocal Track)
6. "I'll Spend My Life With You" (Master Backing Track Take 9)
7. "Randy Scouse Git" (Master Backing Track Take 23)
8. "Forget That Girl" (Rehearsal)
9. "Forget That Girl" (Master Backing Track)
10. "Where Has It All Gone?" (First Version) (Tracking Session Take 1)
11. "Memphis Tennessee"
12. "Twelve-String Improvisation"
13. "Where Has It All Gone?" (Second Version) (Master Basic Track Take 12)
14. "Jericho"
15. "Forget That Girl" (Rough Backing Vocals)
16. "Peter Gunn's Gun"
17. "I Was Born in East Virginia" (Informal Recording Vocal)
18. "Forget That Girl" (Rejected Overdub Session Vocal)
19. "Randy Scouse Git" (Alternate Mix With Unused Tag Vocal)
20. "Micky in Carlsbad Cavern" (Studio Dialogue)
21. "Pillow Time" (Take 1 Vocal)
22. "Shades of Gray" (Master Backing Track Take 9B)
23. "Masking Tape" (Tracking Session Composite Takes 6 to 8)
24. "You Just May Be the One" (Tracking Session Composite)
25. "You Just May Be the One" (Master Backing Track)
26. "No Time" (First Version) (Tracking Session Composite Takes 3 to 5)
27. "Blues" (Excerpt)

Disc three

1. "I Can't Get Her Off My Mind" (Master Backing Track)
2. "Banjo Jam" (Excerpt)
3. "Cripple Creek"
4. "Six-String Improvisation"
5. "The Story of Rock and Roll" (First Version) (Tracking Session Take 23)
6. "Early Morning Blues and Greens" (Master Backing Track)
7. "Two-Part Invention in F Major" (Informal Recording)
8. "The Story of Rock and Roll" (Second Version) (Tracking Session Take 5A)
9. "Don't Be Cruel"
10. "For Pete's Sake" (Master Backing Track)
11. "No Time" (Second Version) (Tracking Session Composite)
12. "No Time" (Second Version) (Master Backing Track Take 7A)
13. "Just a Game" (Demo Takes 1 to 3)
14. "Fever"
15. "Sunny Girlfriend" (Master Backing Track)
16. "No Time" (second version) (Master Take 7A With Backing Vocals)
17. "All Of Your Toys" (Mono Master)
18. "The Girl I Knew Somewhere" (First Version) (Mono Master)
19. "For Pete's Sake" (Mono Master)
20. "I'll Spend My Life With You" (Mono Master)
21. "Forget That Girl" (Mono Master)
22. "You Just May Be the One" (Mono Master)
23. "Shades of Gray" (Mono Master)
24. "Band 6" (Mono Master)
25. "Sunny Girlfriend" (Mono Master)
26. "Mr. Webster" (Mono Master)
27. "You Told Me" (Mono Master)
28. "The Girl I Knew Somewhere" (Second Version) (Mono Master)
29. "Zilch" (Mono Master)
30. "Early Morning Blues and Greens" (Mono Master)
31. "Randy Scouse Git" (Mono Master)
32. "I Can't Get Her Off My Mind" (Mono Master)
33. "No Time" (Mono Master)

== Personnel ==
Credits adapted from CD box set liner notes.

The Monkees

- Michael Nesmith – vocals, electric 12-string guitar, acoustic 12-string guitar, steel guitar, electric guitar
- Peter Tork – vocals, bass guitar, acoustic guitar, harpsichord, electric guitar, piano, banjo, acoustic 12-string guitar, organ, celeste, electric piano, tack piano, percussion
- Micky Dolenz – vocals, drums, electric guitar
- David Jones – vocals, maracas, tambourine, jawbone, percussion

Additional musicians

- John London – bass guitar ("The Girl I Knew Somewhere", "All of Your Toys", "Sunny Girlfriend", "Mr. Webster", "Where Has It All Gone"), tambourine ("The Girl I Knew Somewhere" [Version 2])
- Chip Douglas – bass guitar ("Randy Scouse Git", "You Told Me", "I'll Spend My Life With You", "Forget That Girl", "The Story of Rock and Roll", "Early Morning Blues and Greens", "For Pete's Sake", "No Time" [Version 2])
- Jerry Yester – bass guitar ("Shades of Gray", "Masking Tape", "I Can't Get Her Off My Mind", "No Time" [Version 1], "Banjo Jam", "Cripple Creek")
- Frederick Seykora – cello ("Shades of Gray")
- Vincent De Rosa – French horn ("Shades of Gray")

Unconfirmed personnel and duties

- Micky Dolenz – unknown ("Mr. Webster")
- Acoustic guitar ("Forget That Girl")
- Bass guitar ("Where Has It All Gone")
- Keith Allison – unknown ("No Time", "Blues")
- Gerry McGee – unknown ("No Time", "Blues")
- Electric guitar ("For Pete's Sake", "No Time")

Technical

- Douglas Farthing Hatlelid – original recording producer; mixing (disc 3, tracks 17–33)
- Roland Worthington Hand – compilation producer, liner notes
- Andrew Sandoval – project producer, liner notes, mixing (discs 1 and 2; disc 3, tracks 1–16), archival materials
- Dick Bogert – engineer ("She's So Far Out, She's In")
- Rick Schmidt – engineer ("She's So Far Out, She's In")
- Hank Cicalo – engineer; mixing (disc 3, tracks 17–33)
- Michael Nesmith – horn arranger ("Shades of Gray")
- Peter Tork – horn orchestrator ("Shades of Gray")
- Rectangle Van Elk – assistant to the curator
- D K Baker – deputy chief archivist
- Mr Robert Dobalena – archival assistance
- Dave Pearlman – mixing assistant (discs 1 and 2; disc 3, tracks 1–16)
- Dan Hersch – editing, assembly, remastering
- Bill Inglot – remastering
- Bryan Lansley – art direction, design
- Patrick Pending – art direction, design
- Michael Ochs Archive – photographs
