= List of Canadian number-one albums of 1966 =

This list contains the albums ranking number one in Canada in 1966.

== Albums ==
Date	Title	Artist	Ref
January 3	Rubber Soul	The Beatles	
January 10	Rubber Soul	The Beatles	
January 17	Rubber Soul	The Beatles	
January 24	Rubber Soul	The Beatles	
January 31	Rubber Soul	The Beatles	
February 7	Rubber Soul	The Beatles	
February 14	Rubber Soul	The Beatles	
February 21	Rubber Soul	The Beatles	
February 28	Whipped Cream	Tijuana Brass	
March 7	Whipped Cream	Tijuana Brass	
March 14	Rubber Soul	The Beatles	
March 21	Whipped Cream	Tijuana Brass	
March 28	Whipped Cream	Tijuana Brass	
April 4	Whipped Cream	Tijuana Brass	
April 11	Whipped Cream	Tijuana Brass	
April 18	Whipped Cream	Tijuana Brass	
April 25	Whipped Cream	Tijuana Brass	
May 2	Whipped Cream	Tijuana Brass	
May 9	Big Hits (High Tide)	Rolling Stones	
May 16	Big Hits (High Tide)	Rolling Stones	
May 23	Big Hits (High Tide)	Rolling Stones	
May 30	Big Hits (High Tide)	Rolling Stones	
June 6	Big Hits (High Tide)	Rolling Stones	
June 13	Big Hits (High Tide)	Rolling Stones	
June 20	Big Hits (High Tide)	Rolling Stones	
June 27	What Now My Love	Tijuana Brass	
July 4	Yesterday & Today	The Beatles	
July 11	Yesterday & Today	The Beatles	
July 18	Yesterday & Today	The Beatles	
July 25	Yesterday & Today	The Beatles	
August 1	Yesterday & Today	The Beatles	
August 8	Yesterday & Today	The Beatles	
August 15	Aftermath	The Rolling Stones	
August 22	Revolver	The Beatles	
August 29	Revolver	The Beatles	
September 5	Revolver	The Beatles	
September 12	Revolver	The Beatles	
September 19	Revolver	The Beatles	
September 26	Revolver	The Beatles	
October 3	Revolver	The Beatles	
October 10	Revolver	The Beatles	
October 17	The Monkees	The Monkees	
October 24	The Monkees	The Monkees	
October 31	The Monkees	The Monkees	
November 7	The Monkees	The Monkees	
November 14	The Monkees	The Monkees	
November 21	The Monkees	The Monkees	
November 28	The Monkees	The Monkees	
December 5	The Monkees	The Monkees	
December 12	The Monkees	The Monkees	
December 19	The Monkees	The Monkees	
