= Yes I Will =

- Cover of Swedish Single

Single by the Hollies
- B-side: "Nobody"
- Released: 22 January 1965
- Recorded: 3 January 1965
- Studio: EMI, London
- Genre: Pop rock
- Length: 2:57
- Label: Parlophone (UK); Imperial (US)
- Songwriters: Gerry Goffin, Russ Titelman
- Producer: Ron Richards

The Hollies singles chronology
"We're Through" (1964)	"Yes I Will" (1965)	"I'm Alive" (1965)

"Yes I Will", also known as "I'll Be True to You", is a song written by Gerry Goffin and Russ Titelman. The song was first recorded in 1964 by British Beat group the Hollies who released it as a single in January 1965 where it peaked at number 9 in the United Kingdom that April. Two versions of this song were released by the Hollies. An alternate take with prominent acoustic guitars and a different intro was included on the band's 1968 greatest hits album in the UK.

While a top 10 hit in the UK, it failed to chart entirely in the US and Canada where it was released two months later on the Imperial and Capitol labels, respectively. It would not see re-release on LP in either of those countries and original copies of the single are scarce.

== Cover versions ==
A version of the song titled "I'll Be True to You" was recorded by the Monkees and included on their 1966 self-titled debut album. Australian group the Twilights also recorded a version on their eponymous 1966 album.

== Charts ==
Chart (1965)	Peak position
Sweden	11
UK Singles (Official Charts)	9
