= Sweet Young Thing =

Song by the Monkees

from the album The Monkees
- Released: October 11, 1966
- Recorded: July 18 and 27, 1966
- Genre: Pop rock
- Length: 1:56
- Label: Colgems
- Songwriters: Gerry Goffin; Carole King; Michael Nesmith
- Producer: Nesmith

"Sweet Young Thing" is a song by the American pop rock band the Monkees, released as the penultimate track on their eponymous debut album (1966). Written as a one time collaboration between Gerry Goffin, Carole King and Michael Nesmith, and produced solely by Nesmith, the song has been seen as a fan favorite and included on many lists of Nesmith's best writing credits.

== Background and recording ==
Recording of "Sweet Young Thing" began during a late night session after a 10 minute break following the recording of "I Won't Be the Same Without Her" on July 18, 1966, with the group of session musicians and the Monkees recording six takes, with the final take being selected by Nesmith for later overdubs. They later regrouped on July 27 to add on overdubs, those being a second lead vocal from Nesmith, which was later double- tracked on to the original lead vocal take, and backing vocals from Peter Tork and Micky Dolenz, Tork also played a guitar on the recording.

== Critical reception ==
In a review for AllMusic, Matthew Greenwald wrote that "The result of a somewhat forced songwriting collaboration between Michael Nesmith and Carole King and Gerry Goffin, "Sweet Young Thing" actually ended up being a piece of proto-psychedelia. A simple, hard rock, bluesy chord progression drives the song, which is colored nicely by Nesmith's Texas twang." The A.V. Club noted that the song "doesn’t even hit the two-minute mark, but makes an unforgettable impact nonetheless." Mike Segretto called it in his book 33 1/3 Revolutions Per Minute: A Critical Trip Through the Rock LP Era, 1955–1999, a "truly far-out merger of thumping garage rock and wild Zydeco that sounded utterly unlike anything in the charts." Nesmith himself has said that he likes the track, with him stating that "I think "Sweet Young Thing" is a good song", noting that "It was not the sort of songwriting alliance that I would continue to any great effect", concluding by saying that "I really did enjoy working with them; it was just the circumstances that were tough."

== Personnel ==
According to author Andrew Sandoval:

The Monkees

- Michael Nesmith – lead vocal
- Peter Tork – guitar, Dano bass, backing vocals
- Micky Dolenz – backing vocals

Additional personnel

- Jimmy Bryant – fiddle
- James Burton – guitar, Dano bass
- Glen Campbell: guitar, Dano bass
- Al Casey – guitar, Dano bass
- Mike Deasy – guitar, Dano bass
- Hal Blaine – drums
- Gary Coleman – percussion
- Frank DeVito – percussion
- Larry Knechtel – piano
- Bob West – bass
- unknown – backing vocal

== Use in The Monkees TV show ==
"Sweet Young Thing" is included in two episodes of The Monkees TV show, those being episodes number 6, "Success Story", and episode 19, "The Audition (Find the Monkees)".
