= Christopher Cloud =

American rock band

- Christopher Cloud "Blown Away" LP

Background information
- Origin: United States
- Genres: Rock
- Years active: 1973
- Labels: Chelsea
- Past members: Tommy Boyce (Christopher Cloud); Michael Overly; Patrick O'Connor; Buggs Pemberton

Christopher Cloud was a band assembled by Tommy Boyce of Boyce and Hart fame, in 1973. They released an album called Blown Away on Chelsea Records (BCL1-0234) that same year. The band featured members of the group AIM. Boyce used an alias on the record of "Tomme" and his image (hidden behind clouds) was used for the cover. This album has never been reissued on CD. It is to note that the last song on side A (Thank God For Rock'n Roll) is not referenced anywhere but on the actual record label.

Billboard stated "This is an entertaining, off beat group with a taste of humor running through its music. There is a tinge of country in the arrangement, with Cloud's lead voice crisp and assertive: his vocal associates have a grand time repeating phrases in good tight harmonies."

The Retriever stated "They have a super-charged sound which moves at an incredible pace. Led by former AM whiz Tomme Boyce, the group tackles everything from Boogie Woogie to Rock 'N Roll, to Urban Blues. One thing I must say about Christopher Cloud is that I have never heard a group play rock as fast as they do at certain times on this album. A group with as much energy as they possess will have to cause some stir in the record world."

Two singles were released from the album, "Thank God for Rock 'N Roll" / "Krush on Kris" (BCBO-0101) and "Zip A Dee Doo Dah" / "Interpretation of War" (78-0118), both featuring non-LP B-sides.

AIM released an album in 1974 called Aim For The Highest on Blue Thumb Records (BST64).

== Track listing ==
1. "Brand New Boogie at 10AM" (Michael Overly, Tommy Boyce)
2. "Friendly Sabotage" (Michael Overly, Tommy Boyce)
3. "Celebration" (Tomme)
4. "Do You Want Me for Five Minutes?" (Tomme)
5. "Thank God For Rock'n Roll" (Boyce-Boyce)
6. "I Heard It All Thru The Wall" (Michael Overly, Tommy Boyce)
7. "Cecilia" (Paul Simon)
8. "Dr. Moss" (Tomme)
9. "Zip a Dee Doo Dah" (Allie Wrubel, Ray Gilbert)
10. "Sandra, The Cat Lover"

== Personnel ==
- Tomme (Tommy Boyce) and Michael Overly - vocals
- Michael Overly - vocals, lead guitar
- Patrick O'Connor - bass guitar
- Buggs Pemberton - drums
- Ben Benay - harmonica
- Nino Tempo - saxophone
- Christopher Cloud (Tommy Boyce) - arrangements
- Tomme (Tommy Boyce) - producer
