= I Wonder What She's Doing Tonight =

Single by Boyce and Hart

from the album I Wonder What She's Doing Tonight?
- B-side: "The Ambushers"
- Released: December 1967
- Genre: Pop rock, bubblegum pop
- Length: 2:43
- Label: A&M
- Songwriters: Tommy Boyce, Bobby Hart
- Producers: Tommy Boyce, Bobby Hart

Boyce and Hart singles chronology
"Love Every Day" (1968)	"I Wonder What She's Doing Tonight" (1967)	"Goodbye Baby (I Don't Want To See You Cry)" (1968)

"I Wonder What She's Doing Tonight" is a song written and originally recorded by Tommy Boyce and Bobby Hart (not to be confused with the Barry & the Tamerlanes song of the same title released in 1963). The Boyce and Hart composition was arranged by Artie Butler.

Entering the Billboard Hot 100 at #87 just before Christmas 1967, it became a true hit in 1968, reaching #7 on the Cash Box chart and #8 on the Billboard Hot 100 chart. In April 1968, an album of the same name was released, by which time the word 'Tonight' had been changed to 'Tonite'.

Marvin Stamm performs the trumpet solo and the recording features the voice of Tommy Boyce saying "Aww, come on now," in the second verse and "All right, Bobby, let's go," to Bobby Hart just before the third verse.

Boyce and Hart also recorded a version in French featuring the same instrumentation and verbal cues by Tommy Boyce. At the end of the song is the refrain from the 1966 Michel Polnareff song "La poupée que fait non" ("The Doll Who Says No").

In 1981, A&M released the album I Wonder What She's Doing Tonite? to the Japanese market.

== Other recorded versions ==
- Gary Lewis and the Playboys on their 1968 album Gary Lewis Now!
- Trini Lopez on his 1969 album The Whole Enchilada.
- Young Fresh Fellows on their 2001 album Because We Hate You
- An instrumental is featured in the 1969 film Cactus Flower.
- James Collen on his 1990 single for Amherst Records
- The Explorers Club on the album To Sing And Be Born Again (2020).
