= I Wanna Be Free (The Monkees song) =

Single by The Monkees

from the album The Monkees
- B-side: "You Just May Be the One"
- Released: May 1967
- Genre: Chamber pop
- Length: 2:27
- Label: RCA (Australia); Arista (Japan)
- Songwriter: Tommy Boyce, Bobby Hart
- Producers: Tommy Boyce, Bobby Hart

The Monkees singles chronology
"A Little Bit Me, a Little Bit You" (1967)	"I Wanna Be Free" (1967)	"Pleasant Valley Sunday" (1967)

"I Wanna Be Free" is a song written by Tommy Boyce and Bobby Hart that was first performed by The Monkees and appeared on their debut album The Monkees in 1966. It was released as a single in some countries, reaching the Top 20 in Australia. It was also covered by The Lettermen.

== Monkees version ==
Boyce and Hart wrote "I Wanna Be Free" for the Monkees before the group was even put together. Along with "(Theme from) The Monkees" and "Let's Dance On," it was one of the first songs written for the group. It was also the only song written for the Monkees' first album which was not written under deadline pressure. According to Allmusic critic Matthew Greenwald, the song was an attempt by Boyce and Hart to write a song like The Beatles' "Yesterday." Like "Yesterday," the instrumentation for "I Wanna Be Free" incorporates a string quartet. The instrumentation also incorporates acoustic guitar and harpsichord. Davy Jones sang the vocals.

A faster version of the song was recorded with Micky Dolenz sharing the vocals with Jones. This version appeared in the TV series and as a bonus track on some releases of The Monkees.

The song appeared in a number of episodes of The Monkees TV series, including the pilot episode and "Success Story." It was also included on the Monkees' debut album, in part to insure that the album included a gentle ballad. Since then, it has appeared on many Monkees' compilation albums, including Colgems' The Monkees Greatest Hits, Barrel Full of Monkees, Arista Records' The Monkees Greatest Hits, Rhino Records' Greatest Hits, The Monkees Anthology and The Best of The Monkees. It also appeared on the live albums Live 1967 and Summer 1967: The Complete U.S. Concert Recordings.

Allmusic's Matthew Greenwald calls the song a "positively beautiful and wistful statement of teenage coming of age" and also praises its melody. Greenwald also considers the song important in helping the Monkees gain a pre-teen audience, noting that Jones' "angst-filled" live performances of the song were especially effective at eliciting emotional responses from the girls in the audience. Fellow Allmusic critic Tim Sendra finds the song "achingly sweet, even a little soulful in a very British way." CMJ New Music Monthly author Nicole Keiper referred to the song as "heavenly." However, Digital Audio and Compact Disc Review magazine referred to the song as an "inconsequential teeny ballad."

According to Boyce, "I Wanna Be Free" was Jimmy Webb's favorite song and even inspired the song "By the Time I Get to Phoenix," which Webb wrote for Glen Campbell and which became a top 10 hit on the country music charts in 1967.

== Chart performance ==
"I Wanna Be Free" was released as a single in some countries in 1967. It reached #17 on Australia's Go-Set chart and #8 on Billboard Magazine's Australian "Hits of the World" charts. The song also reached #7 in Singapore on Billboard's "Hits of the World" charts.

== Covers ==
French singer Jean-Paul Vignon covered the song the same year it was first published. Jimmie Rodgers covered the song in 1968, in a recording that Billboard Magazine called "poignant ballad material...performed in first rate fashion." The Lettermen covered "I Wanna Be Free" on their 1968 album Goin' Out of My Head. Songwriters Tommy Boyce and Bobby Hart covered the song themselves on their 1968 album I Wonder What She's Doing Tonite? The Manhattan Strings recorded an instrumental version of the song in 1967. Andy Williams covered it for his 1967 LP Born Free. Ed Ames covered the song on the album "Who will Answer" (1968) with studio vocalists and musicians. The character Omar White (portrayed by actor Michael Wright) sings the slow version of the song during a variety show in the Season 5 (2002) episode "Variety" of the HBO hit prison series Oz.
