= Missing Links (album) =

Compilation album by the Monkees
- Released: June 1987
- Recorded: 1966–1969
- Genre: Rock
- Length: 41:56
- Label: Rhino
- Producer: Bill Inglot

The Monkees chronology
Live 1967 (1987)	Missing Links (1987)	Pool It! (1987)

Professional ratings
Review scores
Source	Rating
AllMusic	3/5 stars
New Musical Express	9/10

Missing Links is a compilation album of rare and previously unreleased songs by the American pop rock band the Monkees, issued by Rhino Records in 1987. It is the first volume of a three-volume set, followed by Missing Links Volume Two in 1990 and Missing Links Volume Three in 1996.

While "Apples, Peaches, Bananas and Pears" and "If You Have the Time" had both been featured in the reruns of their 1960s television series, none of the tracks had ever been issued commercially. "All of Your Toys", written by Bill Martin, was the first Monkees recording to feature all four members performing on the track, and was initially intended to become their third single. A publishing issue prevented the song from being released, with Neil Diamond's "A Little Bit Me, A Little Bit You" chosen instead. The bulk of the material on the album comes from the sessions for The Birds, The Bees and The Monkees (1968). Michael Nesmith later re-recorded "Nine Times Blue" for his Magnetic South album and "Carlisle Wheeling" (as "Conversations") for his Loose Salute album.

In 2021, Friday Music released the album on colored vinyl for Record Store Day.

== Track listing ==
CD version
No.	Title	Lead vocals	Length
1.	"Apples, Peaches, Bananas and Pears" (Tommy Boyce, Bobby Hart)	Micky Dolenz	2:16
2.	"If You Have the Time" (David Jones, Bill Chadwick)	Jones	2:09
3.	"I Don't Think You Know Me" (Gerry Goffin, Carole King)	Michael Nesmith	2:15
4.	"Party" (Jones, Steve Pitts)	Jones	2:46
5.	"Carlisle Wheeling" (Nesmith)	Nesmith	3:20
6.	"Storybook of You" (Boyce, Hart)	Jones	2:53
7.	"Rosemarie" (Dolenz)	Dolenz	2:29
8.	"My Share of the Sidewalk" (Nesmith)	Jones	3:07
9.	"All of Your Toys" (Bill Martin)	Dolenz	3:09
10.	"Nine Times Blue" (Nesmith)	Nesmith	2:10
11.	"So Goes Love" (Goffin, King)	Jones	3:08
12.	"Teeny Tiny Gnome" (Lynn Castle, Wayne Erwin)	Dolenz	2:28
13.	"Of You" (Bill Chadwick, John Chadwick)	Nesmith	1:58
14.	"War Games" (Jones, Pitts)	Jones	2:34
15.	"Lady's Baby" (Peter Tork)	Tork	2:27
16.	"Time and Time Again" (Jones, Chadwick)	Jones	2:50

- Tracks 7, 8, 15 and 16 are bonus tracks only available on the 1988 Rhino CD.

== Personnel ==
Credits as per CD liner notes.

- Tommy Boyce – producer (1, 6, 12)
- Bobby Hart – producer (1, 6, 12)
- Davy Jones – producer (2, 16)
- Bill Chadwick – producer (2, 16)
- Jeff Barry – producer (3)
- The Monkees – producer (4, 7–8, 14)
- Michael Nesmith – producer (5, 10–11, 13)
- Chip Douglas – producer (9)
- Peter Tork – producer (15)
- Bill Inglot – compact disc producer, compiler, remixer, digital prep and transfers
- Harold Bronson – compiler
- Don Brown – art direction
- Lisa Sutton – design
- Virginia LeRossignol – design
- Gene Trindl – front cover photo
- Ken Perry – digital prep and transfers
