= Your Auntie Grizelda =

Song by the Monkees

from the album More of the Monkees
- Released: January 10, 1967
- Recorded: October 23, 1966
- Studio: American, Studio City, California
- Genre: Psychedelic pop
- Length: 2:30
- Label: Colgems
- Composer: Jack Keller
- Lyricist: Diane Hildebrand
- Producers: Jeff Barry, Jack Keller

"Your Auntie Grizelda" is a song recorded by the American pop rock group the Monkees. Diane Hildebrand wrote the lyrics and Jack Keller composed the music. It is the first released song of the band with Peter Tork on lead vocals.

The song appeared on both the TV series and the 1967 album More of the Monkees. While originally published by Screen Gems-Columbia Music (BMI), it is now published by Colgems-EMI Music (ASCAP).

== Popularization ==
Although never released as a single, "Your Auntie Grizelda" has appeared on several of the band's subsequent "Greatest Hits" albums, and the Monkees regularly performed it in their live shows. In the instrumental break, Tork was told beforehand to make nonsensical sounds, according to songwriter Diane Hildebrand.

== Lyrics ==
"Your Auntie Grizelda" is a general complaint about a prissy and spinsterish aunt named Grizelda. The verses condemn her as pushy, righteous, and judgemental, with the chorus concluding that "No bird of grace ever lit on auntie Grizelda".

== Outside of The Monkees shows ==
An instrumental version of the song can be heard during Major Nelson's bachelor party in I Dream of Jeannie Season 5 Episode 6, and the hippie party in "Never Put A Genie on a Budget" Season 5 Episode 14. An instrumental version also is the background disco music in The Flying Nun Season 1 Episode 2.
