= More of the Monkees =

Studio album by the Monkees
- Released: January 9, 1967
- Recorded: June 25 – November 23, 1966
- Studios: RCA Victor A, B (Hollywood); RCA Victor A, B (New York); Western Recorders, No. 2 (Hollywood); American Recording Co. (Studio City); RCA Victor (Hollywood)
- Genre: Pop rock
- Length: 28:34
- Label: Colgems
- Producers: Tommy Boyce; Bobby Hart; Carole Bayer Sager; Neil Sedaka; Michael Nesmith; Jeff Barry; Jack Keller; Gerry Goffin; Carole King

The Monkees chronology
The Monkees (1966)	More of the Monkees (1967)	Headquarters (1967)

Singles from More of the Monkees
- 1. "I'm a Believer" / "(I'm Not Your) Steppin' Stone" Released: November 21, 1966; 2. "Mary, Mary" Released: 1968

Professional ratings
Review scores
Source	Rating
AllMusic	4/5 stars
MusicHound	3/5 stars
The Rolling Stone Album Guide	2/5 stars

More of the Monkees is the second studio album by the American pop rock band the Monkees, released in 1967 on Colgems Records. It was recorded in late 1966 and displaced the band's debut album from the top of the Billboard Top LPs chart, remaining at No. 1 for 18 weeks, the longest run of any Monkees album. The first two Monkees albums were at the top of the Billboard chart for 31 combined consecutive weeks. More of the Monkees also reached No. 1 in the UK. In the U.S., it has been certified quintuple platinum by the RIAA, with sales of more than five million copies. More of the Monkees is also notable as the first pop album to become the best-selling album of the year in the U.S.

== History ==
The Monkees' popularity was at its peak when the album was released. Their second single, "I'm a Believer", held the No. 1 position on the Billboard Hot 100 and they were about to embark on a highly successful concert tour.

The release of More of the Monkees was rushed to capitalize on the band's popularity, catching even its members by surprise. The band learned of the album's existence while on tour in Cleveland, Ohio, surprised that it had been released without their knowledge. They were dismayed by the cover image (which had been used in an advertisement for JCPenney) and were offended by production overseer Don Kirshner's liner notes, which praised his team of songwriters before mentioning, almost as an afterthought, the names of the Monkees. The band, particularly Nesmith, was also furious about the songs—selected for the record from 34 that had been recorded—leading Nesmith to later tell Melody Maker magazine that More of the Monkees was "probably the worst album in the history of the world".

The group began to grow concerned over their musical output because for this album and their debut, The Monkees, they were limited to just vocals with scattered instrumental contributions. Kirshner had a strict rule that the Monkees were to provide only vocals on his productions, although separate sessions produced by Michael Nesmith usually featured Peter Tork on guitar. More of the Monkees has Nesmith limited to one song as lead vocalist.

Within weeks of the release of More of the Monkees, Nesmith lobbied successfully with the group's creators, Bob Rafelson and Bert Schneider, for the Monkees to be allowed to play their instruments on future records, effectively giving the quartet artistic control. To make his point clear to Kirshner, who had balked at the idea, Nesmith punched a hole in the wall of a suite at the Beverly Hills Hotel during a group meeting with Kirshner and Colgems lawyer Herb Moelis, declaring to Moelis: "That could have been your face!". Kirshner was later dropped from the project.

=== Artwork ===
The original pressing catalog number is COM/COS 102. When the album was reissued in 1968, the Colgems symbol replaced the word "Colgems" on the bottom right-hand corner of the reverse side (catalog number COS 102 RE). It was standard practice for RCA to add an "RE" when any one side of a record sleeve had a revision.

== Track listing ==
Side one
No.	Title	Writer(s)	Lead vocals	Length
1.	"She"	Tommy Boyce, Bobby Hart	Micky Dolenz	2:40
2.	"When Love Comes Knockin' (At Your Door)"	Carole Bayer Sager, Neil Sedaka	Davy Jones	1:49
3.	"Mary, Mary"	Michael Nesmith	Dolenz	2:16
4.	"Hold On Girl"	Billy Carr, Jack Keller, Ben Raleigh	Jones	2:29
5.	"Your Auntie Grizelda"	Diane Hildebrand, Jack Keller	Peter Tork	2:30
6.	"(I'm Not Your) Steppin' Stone"	Boyce, Hart	Dolenz	2:25

Side two
No.	Title	Writer(s)	Lead vocals	Length
1.	"Look Out (Here Comes Tomorrow)"	Neil Diamond	Jones	2:16
2.	"The Kind of Girl I Could Love"	Nesmith, Roger Atkins	Nesmith	1:53
3.	"The Day We Fall in Love"	Sandy Linzer, Denny Randell	Jones	2:26
4.	"Sometime in the Morning"	Gerry Goffin, Carole King	Dolenz	2:30
5.	"Laugh"	Phil Margo, Mitch Margo, Hank Medress, Jay Siegel	Jones	2:30
6.	"I'm a Believer"	Diamond	Dolenz	2:50
Total length:				28:34

== Personnel ==
Credits adapted from 2017 Rhino "Super Deluxe Edition" box set.

The Monkees

- Micky Dolenz – lead vocals (1, 3, 6, 10, 12), backing vocals (1–4, 7–8, 10, 12)
- Davy Jones – backing vocals (1, 4, 7–8, 10–12), lead vocals (2, 4, 7, 9, 11)
- Peter Tork – backing vocals (1, 7–8, 10, 12), guitar (3), lead vocals (5)
- Michael Nesmith – lead vocals (8), backing vocals (8), steel guitar (8)

Additional musicians

- Wayne Erwin – guitar (1, 6), backing vocals (1, 6)
- Gerry McGee – guitar (1, 6)
- Louis Shelton – guitar (1, 6)
- Bobby Hart – organ (1, 6), backing vocals (1, 6)
- Larry Taylor – bass guitar (1, 6)
- Billy Lewis – drums (1, 6)
- Norm Jeffries – tambourine (1)
- Tommy Boyce – backing vocals (1, 6)
- Ron Hicklin – backing vocals (1)
- Al Gafa – guitar (2)
- Willard Suyker – guitar (2)
- Don Thomas – guitar (2)
- Neil Sedaka – keyboards (2)
- Russ Savakus – bass guitar (2, 7, 12)
- Herbie Lovelle – drums (2)
- James Burton – guitar (3, 8)
- Glen Campbell – guitar (3, 8)
- Al Casey – guitar (3, 8–9, 11)
- Mike Deasy – guitar (3)
- Michael Cohen – keyboards (3)
- Larry Knechtel – keyboards (3, 8)
- Bob West – bass guitar (3, 8)
- Hal Blaine – drums (3, 8–9, 11)
- Gary Coleman – percussion (3, 8)
- Jim Gordon – percussion (3, 8)
- Neil Diamond – guitar (7, 12)
- Sal DiTroia – guitar (7, 12)
- Al Gorgoni – guitar (7, 12)
- George Butcher – keyboards (7, 12)
- Stan Free – keyboards (7, 12)
- Buddy Saltzman – drums (7, 12)
- George Devens – percussion (7, 12)
- Carol Kaye – guitar (8, 11)
- Don Randi – keyboards (8, 11)
- Michel Rubini – keyboards (8, 11)
- Ray Pohlman – bass guitar (8, 11)
- Frank Capp – percussion (9, 11)
- Julius Wechter – percussion (9, 11)
- Louis Haber – violin (9)
- Irving Spice – violin (9)
- Louis Stone – violin (9)
- David Sackson – viola (9)
- Murray Sandry – viola (9)
- Seymour Barab – cello (9)
- Jeff Barry – backing vocals (11)

Unconfirmed personnel and duties

- Percussion (2, 6)
- Musicians (4–5, 10)
- Additional backing vocals (11)
- Other musicians (12)

Technical

- Don Kirshner – music supervisor
- Lester Sill – music coordinator
- Emil LaViola – music coordinator
- Tommy Boyce – producer (1, 6)
- Bobby Hart – producer (1, 6)
- Neil Sedaka – producer (2)
- Carole Bayer – producer (2)
- Michael Nesmith – producer (3, 8)
- Don Peake – conductor (3, 8)
- Jeff Barry – producer (4, 5, 7, 9, 10–12)
- Jack Keller – producer (4, 5, 7, 9, 11–12)
- Artie Butler – string arranger (9)
- Gerry Goffin – producer (10)
- Carole King – producer (10)
- Ernie Oelrich – engineer
- Henry Lewy – engineer
- Hank Cicalo – engineer
- Richie Schmitt – engineer
- Richard Podolor – engineer
- Dave Hassinger – engineer
- Ray Hall – engineer

== Charts ==
=== Album ===
Chart (1967)	Peak position
Australian Albums (Kent Music Report)	4
Canadian Albums (RPM)	1
Finnish Albums (Suomen virallinen lista)	1
French Albums (SNEP)	25
German Albums (Offizielle Top 100)	16
Norwegian Albums (VG-lista)	1
UK Albums (OCC)	1
US Billboard 200	1
US Top Current Album Sales (Billboard)	96

=== Singles ===
Year	Single	Chart	Peak position
1966	"I'm a Believer"	Billboard Hot 100	1
1966	"(I'm Not Your) Steppin' Stone"	Billboard Hot 100	20
1968	"Look Out (Here Comes Tomorrow)"	Mexico Singles Chart	1

== Certifications ==
Region	Certification	Certified units/sales
United States (RIAA)	5× Platinum	5,000,000^{^}
^{^} Shipments figures based on certification alone.
