= The Monkees (album) =

Studio album by the Monkees
- Released: October 10, 1966
- Recorded: July 5–30, 1966
- Studios: RCA Victor (Hollywood); Western Recorders (Hollywood)
- Genre: Pop rock
- Length: 29:39
- Label: Colgems
- Producers: Tommy Boyce; Bobby Hart; Jack Keller; Michael Nesmith

The Monkees chronology
The Monkees (1966)	More of the Monkees (1967)

Singles from The Monkees
- 1. "Last Train to Clarksville" / "Take a Giant Step" Released: August 16, 1966; 2. "(Theme From) The Monkees" Released: February 1967; 3. "I Wanna Be Free" Released: May 1967

Professional ratings
Review scores
Source	Rating
AllMusic	4/5 stars
MusicHound	3/5 stars
The Rolling Stone Album Guide	2/5 stars

The Monkees is the debut studio album by the American pop rock band the Monkees. It was released on October 10, 1966, by Colgems Records in the United States and RCA Victor in the rest of the world. It was the first of four consecutive U.S. number one albums for the group, taking the top spot on the Billboard 200 for 13 weeks, after which it was displaced by the band's second album. It also topped the UK charts in 1967. The Monkees has been certified quintuple platinum by the RIAA, with sales of over five million copies.

The song "Last Train to Clarksville" was released as a single shortly before the release of the album and went to the top of the Billboard Hot 100 chart. It was the only hit single from the album. "I'll Be True to You" was previously released as a single by the Hollies in January 1965 under the title "Yes I Will".

== Background ==
In late 1965, a pilot for the TV series The Monkees was approved by Screen Gems, the television branch of Columbia Pictures. Producers Bob Rafelson and Bert Schneider (also known as Raybert Productions), wishing to generate funding for experimental movies, came up with the idea of a sitcom about a garage band, inspired by Richard Lester's A Hard Day's Night and Rafelson's own experiences as a musician. After advertising an open casting call in Variety magazine and doing several applications with 437 aspirants, actor/musician Micky Dolenz, British singer/stage actor Davy Jones, recording artist/songwriter Michael Nesmith and Greenwich Village folk musician Peter Tork impressed Raybert enough to be chosen as the Monkees in September 1965. (Note: Jones was already attached to the project because of his contract in Colpix Records, the musical division of Columbia and predecessor of Colgems; Dolenz knew The Monkees by his agent; Tork was recommended by his friend and rejected applicant Stephen Stills and Nesmith was the only one of the four who saw the ad. Nesmith also had recorded some singles for Colpix.) Despite their different backgrounds and initial tensions, the Monkees got along during the filming rehearsals.

Before the pilot was filmed in November 1965, songwriters Tommy Boyce and Bobby Hart were brought to the project by their songs publisher, Screen Gems head of music division Don Kirshner, and commissioned by Raybert to score the episode. There were vague promises that Nesmith and Tork would record their own music. Boyce and Hart then composed and recorded four songs that were used on the original pilot. In February 1966, Columbia ordered 32 episodes of the show after the second screening of the pilot was a success. Soon after, Rafelson and Schneider called Kirshner to be the musical supervisor over the show, because he could supply music enough to the weekly episodes with his extensive portfolio of Brill Building songwriters in his publishing firm.

Dubbed "the Man with the Golden Ear", Kirshner viewed potential in merging television and music, and initially favored Mickie Most, Snuff Garrett, and Carole King for producing the Monkees, but sessions with them did not work well, so Boyce and Hart were called back. Kirshner then negotiated a partnership between Screen Gems and RCA Victor to enter into a joint venture called Colgems Records primarily to distribute Monkees records.

== Recording ==
The album was recorded in numerous separate sessions around Los Angeles from July 5–30, 1966. Early sessions were produced by the trio of Tommy Boyce, Bobby Hart, and Jack Keller; later sessions were produced by Boyce and Hart. Michael Nesmith produced two sessions scheduled around the work done by Boyce, Hart, and Keller.

Famously, the Monkees were not permitted by their management to function as a working band for this album. Although the album cover credits the band as playing instruments (drums for Dolenz; guitar for the other three members), the group's actual contributions were limited almost entirely to vocal tracks. Seven of the album's 12 tracks feature one lone Monkee singing lead vocal over instrumentation and backing vocals recorded entirely by a group of session musicians which varies from song to song. Other tracks feature multiple Monkees singing over session players; only on the two tracks produced by Michael Nesmith does a Monkee (Peter Tork) play an instrument (guitar). Nesmith wrote or co-wrote these tracks. No tracks on the album feature all four Monkees.

== Artwork ==
The photos in the "film strip" on the left side of the back cover are from two episodes of The Monkees'' TV series. The first three photos are from "Your Friendly Neighborhood Kidnappers"; the other two are from the episode "The Spy Who Came in from the Cool". Also included are brief stats on each band member (height, hair color, eye color).

Early pressings of the LP cover, as well as side 1 of the label, featured the misspelled song title "Papa Jean's Blues" (Catalog number COM/COS 101). This was soon corrected as "Papa Gene's Blues" (Catalog number COM/COS 101 RE). It was standard practice for RCA to add an "RE" when any one side of a record or sleeve had a revision. Open copies of both versions are easy to find. In addition, when the album was reissued in 1968 the Colgems' logo replaced the word "Colgems" on the bottom right-hand corner of the reverse side (Catalog number COS 101 RE2).

== Track listing ==
All tracks are written by Tommy Boyce and Bobby Hart, except where noted.

Side one
No.	Title	Writer(s)	Lead vocals	Length
1.	"(Theme From) The Monkees"		Micky Dolenz	2:18
2.	"Saturday's Child"	David Gates	Dolenz	2:43
3.	"I Wanna Be Free"		Davy Jones	2:39
4.	"Tomorrow's Gonna Be Another Day"	Tommy Boyce; Steve Venet	Dolenz	2:39
5.	"Papa Gene's Blues"	Michael Nesmith	Nesmith	1:57
6.	"Take a Giant Step"	Gerry Goffin; Carole King	Dolenz	2:33
Total length:				14:49

Side two
No.	Title	Writer(s)	Lead vocals	Length
1.	"Last Train to Clarksville"		Dolenz	2:44
2.	"This Just Doesn't Seem to Be My Day"		Jones	2:09
3.	"Let's Dance On"		Dolenz	2:30
4.	"I'll Be True to You"	Goffin; Russ Titelman	Jones	2:50
5.	"Sweet Young Thing"	Goffin; King; Nesmith	Nesmith	1:56
6.	"Gonna Buy Me a Dog"		Dolenz; Jones	2:41
Total length:				14:50

== Personnel ==
Credits adapted from 2021 Rhino LP.

The Monkees

- Micky Dolenz – lead vocals (1–2, 4, 6–7, 9), harmony vocals (5), backing vocals (9, 11), vocals (12)
- Davy Jones – lead vocals (3, 8, 10), backing vocals (8), vocals (12)
- Michael Nesmith – lead vocals (5, 11)
- Peter Tork – guitar (5, 11), backing vocals (9, 11)

Additional musicians

- Wayne Erwin – guitar (1–2, 7–10, 12), backing vocals (1–2, 8–9), acoustic guitar (3), electric guitar (4, 6)
- Gerry McGee – guitar (1–2, 7–10, 12), acoustic guitar (3), electric guitar (4, 6), harmonica (4)
- Louis Shelton – guitar (1–2, 7–10, 12), acoustic guitar (3), electric guitar (4, 6)
- Bobby Hart – organ (1–2, 9, 12), backing vocals (1–2, 8–10)
- Larry Taylor – bass guitar (1–2, 4, 6–10, 12)
- Billy Lewis – drums (1–2, 4, 6–10, 12)
- Gene Estes – tambourine (1–2, 7, 9), percussion (6, 8), mallets (6, 8, 10), maracas (9)
- Tommy Boyce – backing vocals (1–2, 8–10), acoustic guitar (4, 6)
- Ron Hicklin – backing vocals (1–2, 8–10)
- Michel Rubini – harpsichord (3, 6)
- Bonnie Douglas – violin (3)
- Paul Shure – violin (3)
- Myra Kestenbaum – violin (3)
- Frederick Seykora – cello (3)
- James Burton – guitar (5, 11), Dano bass (11)
- Glen Campbell – guitar (5, 11), Dano bass (11)
- Al Casey – guitar (5, 11), Dano bass (11)
- Jim Helms – guitar (5)
- Bill Pitman – bass guitar (5)
- Hal Blaine – drums (5, 11)
- Gary Coleman – percussion (5, 11)
- Jim Gordon – percussion (5)
- Jack Keller – piano (6)
- Bob Cooper – oboe (6)
- Joseph DiTullio – cello (8)
- Mike Deasy – guitar (11), Dano bass (11)
- Jimmy Bryant – fiddle (11)
- Larry Knechtel – piano (11)
- Bob West – bass guitar (11)
- Frank DeVito – percussion (11)

Unconfirmed personnel and duties

- Backing vocals (4, 6–7)
- Tambourine (4)
- Handclaps (4)
- Additional backing vocals (11)

Technical

- Tommy Boyce – producer (1–4, 6–10, 12)
- Bobby Hart – producer (1–4, 6–10, 12)
- Jack Keller – producer (1–4, 6, 8–10)
- Michael Nesmith – producer (5, 11)
- Don Peake – conductor (5, 11)
- Hank Cicalo – engineer
- Dave Hassinger – engineer
- Henry Lewy – engineer
- Richie Schmitt – engineer
- Don Kirshner – music supervisor
- Lester Sill – music coordinator
- Emil LaViola – music coordinator

== Charts ==
=== Album ===
Chart (1966–67)	Peak position
Australian Albums (Kent Music Report)	3
Canadian Albums (RPM)	1
Finnish Albums (Suomen virallinen lista)	1
German Albums (Offizielle Top 100)	11
Norwegian Albums (VG-lista)	3
UK Albums (OCC)	1
US Billboard 200	1

=== Single ===
Year	Single	Chart	Peak position
1966	"Last Train to Clarksville"	Billboard Hot 100	1
1967	"Last Train to Clarksville"	UK Charts	23

== Certifications ==
Region	Certification	Certified units/sales
United States (RIAA)	5× Platinum	5,000,000^{^}
^{^} Shipments figures based on certification alone.

== Sources ==
- Baker, Glenn A. (1997). Monkeemania! The Story of the Monkees. Plexus. ISBN 9780859652568.
- Dolenz, Micky; Bego, Mark (1993). I'm a Believer: My Life of Monkees, Music, and Madness. Hyperion. ISBN 9781562828479.
- Hart, Bobby; Ballantyne, Glenn (2015). Psychedelic Bubble Gum: Boyce & Hart, The Monkees, and Turning Mayhem Into Miracles. SelectBooks. ISBN 9781590792919.
- Hickey, Andrew (2011). Monkee Music. Lulu. ISBN 9781447887850.
- Jones, Davy (2000). Daydream Believin'. Hercules. ISBN 9780961861414.
- Lefcowitz, Eric (1985). The Monkees Tale. Last Grasp. ISBN 9780867193381.
- Lefcowitz, Eric (1989). The Monkees Tale (Revised ed.). Last Grasp. ISBN 9780867193787.
- Lefcowitz, Eric (2012). Monkee Business: The Revolutionary Made-for-TV Band. Retrofuture. ISBN 9780943249001.
- Livingston, Scot P. (2015). The Monkees: A Many Fractured Image. CreateSpace. ISBN 9781514694633.
- Massingill, Randi L. (2005). Total Control: The Monkees Michael Nesmith Story . FLEXquarters. ISBN 9780965821841.
- Sandoval, Andrew (2005). The Monkees: The Day-by-Day Story of the '60s TV Pop Sensation. Thunder Bay Press. ISBN 9781592233724.
- Ventrella, Michael A.; Arnold, Mark (2017). Long Title: Looking for the Good Times; Examining the Monkees' Songs, One by One. BearManor. ISBN 9781629331751.
