= Diane Hildebrand =

American pop singer-songwriter (born 1945)

- Also known as: Joya Diane Skye
- Born: April 13, 1945; Roswell, New Mexico, U.S.
- Died: February 19, 2025 (aged 79)
- Genres: Pop, Folk
- Occupation: Singer-songwriter
- Instruments: Vocals, guitar
- Years active: 1958–2025
- Label: Elektra Records

Diane Hildebrand (April 13, 1945 - February 19, 2025) was an American pop singer-songwriter. She wrote for several musicians during the 1960s and 1970s, but is most notable for her work with Screen Gems Music Publishing, penning material for the band the Monkees. In 1969, Hildebrand recorded her debut studio album, Early Morning Blues and Greens. She later released two additional albums under the name Joya Diane Skye.

== Biography ==
Hildebrand was born in Roswell, New Mexico in 1945. She began a songwriting career at age 13 while living in São Paulo, Brazil. One of her earliest compositions, "I'm on My Way", was performed by Barbara Dane on an episode of The Alfred Hitchcock Hour in 1963. The following year, Hildebrand penned the debut single, "He Walks Like a Man", for American country singer Jody Miller—a modest U.S. hit, reaching #66 on the Billboard Chart February 1964. The song was subsequently covered by French, Italian, and German artists.

In the mid-1960s, Hildebrand became a staff writer for Screen Gems, a publication company that supplied many of the songs recorded by the NBC television band the Monkees. For the group's second studio album, More of the Monkees, Hildebrand collaborated with veteran songwriter Jack Keller to write "Your Auntie Grizelda". The songwriting duo also wrote "Early Morning Blues and Greens" for the Monkees' 1967 album Headquarters, and the theme music for another ABC series, The Flying Nun. Without Keller, Hildebrand contributed lyrics to the B-side of the Monkees' chart-topping hit "Daydream Believer", titled "Goin' Down".

In 1967, Hildebrand negotiated a one-album deal with Elektra Records to be produced by David Anderle. She wrote half of the material on the album, titled Early Morning Blues and Greens, but also worked with Keller (on two tracks, including a reprise of the title track), Monkees saxophone player Jim Horn, Don Lottermoser, and bassist Colin Cameron. In his review of the album, music historian Richie Unterberger felt the project "showed a fuller and more serious side of Hildebrand than the Monkees' interpretations of her compositions had". The recording sessions for Early Morning Blues and Greens were conducted at the newly established TTG Studios in Hollywood. It brought together a collective of top session musicians, including Russell White, David Dawson, Fred Myrow, and Tony McCashen, as well as sound engineers Bruce Botnick and Jac Holzman.

Early Morning Blues and Greens was not commercially successful, nor was it heavily promoted by Elektra and Hildebrand. Unterberger surmises the album did not reach a large audience because its style "was neither too 'underground' nor too pop". Following the release of her album, Hildebrand began writing for country rock artists like The Lewis and Clarke Expedition, the Hondells, and Stone Country. Her collaboration with Keller resulted in "Easy Come, Easy Go", which was a Top 10 hit for Bobby Sherman in 1970. With Wes Farrell, she co-wrote the original theme song for The Partridge Family, "When We're Singing." After co-writing the theme for The Ghost Busters with Jackie Mills, in 1975, Hildebrand's songwriting activities declined.

Hildebrand left Hollywood in the late 1970s to live a more nomadic lifestyle and start a family. She independently released her second album, Skye Songs, in 1977, as Joya Diane Skye. Another album, called Sadhana in the Streets, was recorded in India and released in 2003. In 2006, Collector's Choice Music reissued Early Morning Blues and Greens. In 2017 American Windsong Music released a fourth album for Skye titled “Long Time Comin’.” In 2019 the label released a “Live” album of Skye performing many of her earlier hits and other work titled “Live at the Circle of Light” both albums are available from Americanwindsongmusic.com or can be heard on most streaming platforms.
