= Shades of Gray (song) =

Song by The Monkees

from the album Headquarters
- Released: May 22, 1967
- Recorded: March 16 and 22, 1967
- Studio: RCA Victor, C (Hollywood)
- Genre: Chamber pop
- Length: 3:20
- Label: Colgems
- Songwriters: Barry Mann; Cynthia Weil
- Producer: Chip Douglas

"Shades of Gray" is a song written by Barry Mann and Cynthia Weil, recorded by the Monkees for their 1967 album Headquarters. Lead vocals were shared by Davy Jones and Peter Tork, and this is the only track on the album featuring instruments performed by session musicians instead of the band members (and producer Chip Douglas) themselves (French horn and cello).

The song had been recorded previously by a folk-rock trio, the Will-O-Bees, and released in 1967 on the Date Records label. This version was accorded "Chart Spotlights – Predicted to reach the HOT 100" status in the December 31, 1966 issue of Billboard.

== Personnel ==
Credits adapted from 2022 Rhino "Super Deluxe Edition" box set.

The Monkees

- Peter Tork – lead vocals, backing vocals, piano
- Davy Jones – lead vocals, maracas, tambourine
- Michael Nesmith – pedal steel guitar
- Micky Dolenz – drums, harmony vocals

Additional musicians

- Jerry Yester – bass guitar
- Vincent DeRosa – French horn
- Frederick Seykora – cello

Technical

- Chip Douglas (as Douglas Farthing Hatlelid) – producer
- Hank Cicalo – engineer
