= (I'm Not Your) Steppin' Stone =

1966 song written by Tommy Boyce and Bobby Hart

Song by Paul Revere & the Raiders

from the album Midnight Ride
- Released: May 9, 1966
- Recorded: 1966
- Genre: Rock; garage rock; proto-punk
- Songwriter: Tommy Boyce and Bobby Hart
- Producer: Terry Melcher

"(I'm Not Your) Steppin' Stone" is a rock song written by Tommy Boyce and Bobby Hart. It was first recorded by the English band the Liverpool Five in early 1966 but remained unreleased before summer of that same year. In the meantime, the American band Paul Revere & the Raiders recorded the song which appeared on their album Midnight Ride, released in May 1966.

The song is simple musically, with a repeating verse chord progression of E major, G major, A major, and C major, and a repeating bridge in cut time of E major, G major, A major, and G major.

== Monkees version ==
"(I'm Not Your) Steppin' Stone"
- US picture sleeve (reverse)

Single by the Monkees

from the album More of the Monkees
- A-side: "I'm a Believer"
- Released: November 12, 1966
- Recorded: July 26, 1966
- Studio: Western, Hollywood
- Genre: Garage rock; proto-punk; psychedelic rock
- Length: 2:23
- Label: Colgems
- Songwriters: Tommy Boyce; Bobby Hart
- Producers: Tommy Boyce; Bobby Hart

The Monkees singles chronology
"Last Train to Clarksville" (1966)	"I'm a Believer" / "(I'm Not Your) Steppin' Stone" (1966)	"A Little Bit Me, a Little Bit You" (1967)

Official audio
- "(I'm Not Your) Steppin' Stone" (2006 Remaster) on YouTube

"(I'm Not Your) Steppin' Stone" is best known as a hit for the Monkees. Released in November 1966, the song became the first Monkees B-side to chart, reaching #20 on the Billboard Hot 100. Musicians featured on the recording are Micky Dolenz (lead vocal), Tommy Boyce (backing vocal), Wayne Erwin and Gerry McGee (rhythm guitar), Louis Shelton (lead guitar), Bobby Hart (Vox Continental organ), Larry Taylor (bass), Billy Lewis (drums) and Henry Lewy (percussion).

The single, stereo album, and mono album versions contain several differences. In the stereo version, the track's title is sung just before the second verse, whereas on the single and mono album versions, this segment is left instrumental. The stereo version has an edit in the fadeout, but the mono album version does not have this edit and therefore has a longer coda. The single also does not have the edit, but it fades out earlier than does the mono album. All Monkees hits compilations through the mid-1980s used the stereo version, and afterward typically used the single version.

The Monkees' version is featured in the "romp" segments of several episodes of the group's television series. It has also been heard in episodes of shows such as The Queen's Gambit and Zoo.

== Other versions ==
The song has been covered by many artists. Among the more notable is Modern Rocketry's version in 1983, which reached number 7 on the U.S. Hot Dance/Disco chart, and PJ & Duncan's version in 1996, which reached number 11 on the UK Singles Chart and number 27 on the UK Airplay Chart. A baggy version by the Farm was popular in clubs in 1990 and eventually reached number 58 in the UK. The punk bands Sex Pistols, State of Alert, the Queers, and Minor Threat also recorded versions of the song, as well as mod revival band The Merton Parkas.
