= (Theme From) The Monkees =

"(Theme from) The Monkees"

Single by the Monkees

from the album The Monkees
- B-side: "Mary, Mary"
- Released: February 1967
- Recorded: July 5 and 19, 1966
- Studio: RCA Victor (Hollywood, California)
- Genre: Pop rock
- Length: 2:21
- Label: Colgems
- Songwriter: Tommy Boyce and Bobby Hart
- Producers: Tommy Boyce, Bobby Hart and Jack Keller

"(Theme from) The Monkees" is a 1966 pop rock song, written by Tommy Boyce and Bobby Hart as the signature tune for the TV series The Monkees. Two versions were recorded – one for their first album The Monkees and a second shorter rendition designed to open the television show. Both feature vocals by Micky Dolenz.

== Background and composition ==
Boyce and Hart were inspired by the Dave Clark Five's 1965 hit single "Catch Us If You Can" in writing the song; both tracks feature similar musical structures, and in a retrospective interview, Hart was quoted as saying that the drum roll from "Catch Us If You Can" would "take us into the chorus 'Hey, hey, we're the Monkees'". A few years after the release of either song, drummer Dave Clark received a letter from Boyce and Hart in which they admitted to having plagiarized "(Theme from) The Monkees" from "Catch Us If You Can".

== Recording ==
The album version of "(Theme From) The Monkees" was produced by Boyce, Hart, and Jack Keller. According to Hart, music supervisor Don Kirshner advised him and Boyce to bring on Keller to help them produce the recording as he had "more experience". The song's backing track was recorded on July 5, 1966 at RCA Studio A in Hollywood, California. On July 19, work continued on the song. Andrew Sandoval suggests the vocals may have been recorded at a session later that day.

== Release ==
The full-length version was released as a single in several countries. It was a no. 1 hit on Norway's Verdens Gang and Japan's Cash Box singles charts, and reached the top 10 in Australia and Mexico. An Italian version of the song, "Tema Dei Monkees", was released as a single in Italy.

Boyce and Hart recorded a demo of the song for an early pre-broadcast version of The Monkees pilot episode, which was released as a bonus feature on the series' Season 1 DVD box set.

== Other versions ==
Ray Stevens did his take of the theme on his 1985 album He Thinks He's Ray Stevens featuring a male German group of singers, Wolfgang and Fritzy, that are arguing during the refrain of the song. ("Hey Hey Bist Du Monkees".)

The song is featured in the trailer for the 1994 film Monkey Trouble, and it is used on the Minions film soundtrack.

The song is referenced in the 2003 song by The Thrills, "Big Sur."

== Personnel ==
Credits adapted from 2021 Rhino LP.

- Micky Dolenz – lead vocals

Additional musicians

- Tommy Boyce – backing vocals
- Wayne Erwin – guitar, backing vocals
- Gene Estes – tambourine
- Bobby Hart – organ, backing vocals
- Ron Hicklin – backing vocals
- Billy Lewis – drums
- Gerry McGee – guitar
- Louie Shelton – guitar
- Larry Taylor – bass guitar
