= Last Train to Clarksville =

- US picture sleeve

Single by the Monkees

from the album The Monkees
- B-side: "Take a Giant Step"
- Released: August 16, 1966
- Recorded: July 25, 1966
- Studio: RCA Victor (Hollywood, California)
- Genre: Country rock; folk rock; jangle pop; pop rock
- Length: 2:46
- Label: Colgems 1001
- Songwriters: Tommy Boyce; Bobby Hart
- Producers: Tommy Boyce; Bobby Hart

The Monkees singles chronology
"Last Train to Clarksville" (1966)	"I'm a Believer" (1966)

Music video
- "Last Train To Clarksville" (Official Live Video) on YouTube

"Last Train to Clarksville" is a song by American pop rock band the Monkees. It was released as the band's debut single on August 16, 1966, and was later included on the group's self-titled album, which was released on October 10, 1966. The song, written by Tommy Boyce and Bobby Hart, was recorded at RCA Victor Studio B in Hollywood on July 25, 1966, and was already on the Boss Radio "Hit Bounds" playlist on August 17, 1966. The song topped the Billboard Hot 100 for the week ending November 5, 1966. Lead vocals were performed by the Monkees' drummer, Micky Dolenz. "Last Train to Clarksville" was featured in seven episodes of the band's television series, the most for any Monkees song.

== Composition ==
The song was written by the songwriting duo of Tommy Boyce and Bobby Hart. Boyce has said that the song's opening guitar part (played by Louis Shelton) was an attempt to emulate the type of memorable and clearly identifiable riff that the Beatles had used in songs such as "I Feel Fine," "Day Tripper" and "Paperback Writer". The latter Beatles' song had reached number one on the U.S. charts three months earlier, around the time that "Last Train to Clarksville" was written and recorded. The lyrics, too, were inspired by "Paperback Writer": Hart misheard the end of that song on the radio and thought Paul McCartney was singing "take the last train"; Hart then decided to use the line himself, after he found out that McCartney was actually singing "paperback writer."

Hart knew that the Monkees' TV series was being pitched as a music/comedy series in the spirit of the Beatles' film A Hard Day's Night, and he was hoping that by emulating the Beatles the song might become a successful single.

The lyrics tell of a man phoning the woman whom he loves, urging her to meet him at a train station in Clarksville before he must leave, possibly forever. There is no explicit reference to war in the song, but its last line, "And I don't know if I'm ever coming home," was an indirect reference to a soldier leaving for the Vietnam War. Hart has denied any connection by the song to the city of Clarksville, Tennessee, near Fort Campbell, the home of the 101st Airborne Division that was then serving in Vietnam. According to Hart, "We were just looking for a name that sounded good. There's a little town in northern Arizona I used to go through in the summer on the way to Oak Creek Canyon called Clarkdale. We were throwing out names, and when we got to Clarkdale, we thought Clarksville sounded even better. We didn't know it at the time, [but] there is an Army base near the town of Clarksville, Tennessee — which would have fit the bill fine for the storyline. We couldn't be too direct with the Monkees. We couldn't really make a protest song out of it—we kind of snuck it in."

== Recording ==
Boyce and Hart's band, Candy Store Prophets, performed the instrumental session work on the recording.

== B-side ==
The single's B-side, "Take a Giant Step," later appeared as the closing track on side 1 of the Monkees' debut album. Micky Dolenz performed lead vocals.

The song is presented as a plea to a heartbroken girl to move on from her past romantic disappointments and to "learn to live again at last" by "taking a giant step outside your mind." Critic Eric Lefcowitz describes the song as "proto-psychedelic."

== Reception ==
Of "Last Train to Clarksville," Billboard remarked that "all the excitement generated by the promotion campaign for the new group ... is justified by this debut disk loaded with exciting teen dance beat sounds." Cash Box said that it is "a hard-driving, pulsating romantic wailer with catchy repeating riff."

== Personnel ==
- Micky Dolenz – lead vocals
- Wayne Erwin – guitar
- Gerry McGee – guitar
- Louis Shelton – guitar
- Larry Taylor – bass
- Billy Lewis – drums
- Gene Estes – tambourine
- Tommy Boyce and Bobby Hart – producers
- unknown – backing vocals

== Charts ==
=== Weekly charts ===
Chart (1966–1967)	Peak position
Australia (Go-Set)	14
Ireland (IRMA)	5
Finland (Soumen Virallinen)	10
New Zealand (Listener)	6
South Africa (Springbok)	16
US Billboard Hot 100	1

Chart (1966)	Peak position
Canada Top Singles (RPM)	1

Chart (1967)	Peak position
UK Singles Chart	23

=== Year-end charts ===
Chart (1966)	Rank
US Billboard Hot 100	6

Chart (1967)	Rank
Canada (RPM)	12
