= Colgems Records =

Former American record label (1966–1971)

- Parent company: Columbia-Screen Gems; RCA Victor
- Founded: 1966; 60 years ago
- Defunct: 1971
- Status: Defunct
- Distributor: RCA Victor
- Country of origin: U.S.

Colgems Records was a record label that existed from 1966 to 1971.

== History ==
Colgems was a joint venture between Screen Gems, the television division of Columbia Pictures, and RCA Victor to issue records by the Monkees and other artists affiliated with Columbia/Screen Gems. The label also issued soundtrack recordings for Screen Gems and Columbia Pictures productions. RCA acted as manufacturer and distributor for Colgems. Outside of the United States, Colgems productions appeared on the RCA Victor label.

An earlier label, Colpix Records, was dissolved to make way for the new company, and nearly all Colpix titles went out of print. Even before the Monkees began, Colpix had signed two future members – Davy Jones, recruited to Screen Gems by Ward Sylvester, and Michael Nesmith, who recorded as "Michael Blessing". The Colpix catalog was sold to Roulette Records. The Colpix catalog is owned by Warner Music Group with its Rhino Records unit holding the rights in North America and its Parlophone unit the rights in the rest of the world.

The non-Monkees Colgems roster included Sally Field, Jewel Akens, Sajid Khan, Paula Wayne, P.K. Limited, the Hung Jury, Fountain of Youth, the Lewis & Clarke Expedition (whose members included Michael Martin Murphey), Hoyt Axton, Alex Keenan and comedian Rich Little.

They also released soundtracks to Oliver!, In Cold Blood, Head, Guess Who's Coming to Dinner, Casino Royale, Hammerhead, The Professionals, The Night of the Generals, Murderers' Row, Lawrence of Arabia, The Southern Star, The Happening, Interlude and Getting Straight. The Monkees albums released include, The Monkees, More of the Monkees, Headquarters, Pisces, Aquarius, Capricorn & Jones Ltd., and The Birds, the Bees & the Monkees.

== Decline and phaseout ==
Colgems Records slumped after the critical and commercial failure of the final Monkees album Changes, which featured only Davy Jones and Micky Dolenz. The label's last release, titled Barrel Full of Monkees and showcasing its flagship act, appeared in January 1971 and sold poorly but charted on Billboard at 207. Colgems then closed, and its master recordings and artists were folded into Bell Records, which, unlike Colgems, was wholly owned by Columbia Pictures. Bell itself was later disbanded and Columbia's music division was reorganized into Arista Records, headed by Clive Davis.

In 1979, Columbia Pictures sold Arista (including the Colgems assets) to BMG-owned Ariola Records. Six years later, Ariola's parent company, BMG, merged with RCA Records.

Today, the assets of Colgems Records (except for the Monkees' output) are controlled by Sony Music Entertainment. The parent company, Sony, acquired Columbia Pictures in 1989. All of The Monkees' recordings are currently owned by Warner Music Group's Rhino Records, which licensed the group's original Colgems LPs from Arista and reissued them in the mid-1980s. Rhino acquired the entire Monkees audio catalog, The Monkees TV series, their 1968 feature film Head, and the rights to the Monkees name and logo, in August 1994.

SME merged Arista into RCA Records in 2011 but revived it in 2018.

== SGC Records ==
A label related to Colgems was SGC (Screen Gems-Columbia) Records. SGC issued albums by Nazz through Atlantic Records in a distribution deal similar to the one Screen Gems held with RCA.

== See also ==
- List of record labels
- Colpix Records
