= Boyce and Hart =

American singer-songwriter duo

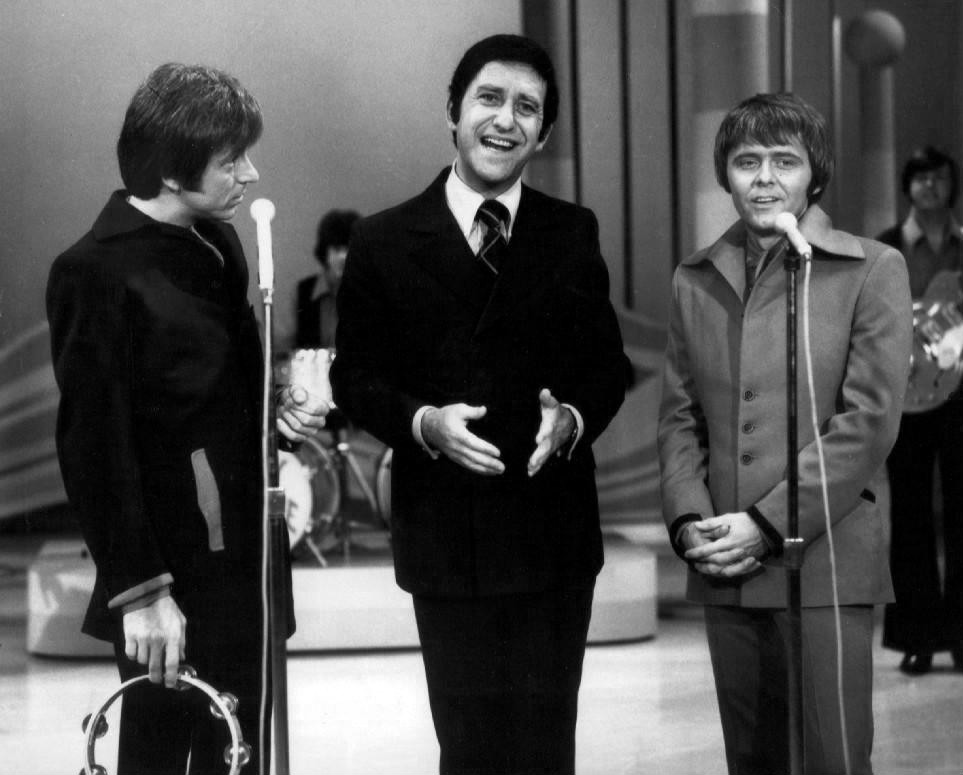
- Boyce and Hart appearing on Soupy Sales' show, 1970

Tommy Boyce
- Born: Sidney Thomas Boyce; September 29, 1939; Charlottesville, Virginia, U.S.
- Died: November 23, 1994 (aged 55) Nashville, Tennessee, U.S.
- Genres: Pop
- Occupation: Singer-songwriter
- Formerly of: Dolenz, Jones, Boyce & Hart; The Tommy Band

Bobby Hart
- Born: Robert Luke Harshman; February 18, 1939; Phoenix, Arizona, U.S.
- Died: September 10, 2025 (aged 86) Los Angeles, California, U.S.
- Occupation: Singer-songwriter
- Formerly of: Dolenz, Jones Boyce & Hart

Sidney Thomas Boyce (September 29, 1939 – November 23, 1994) and Robert Luke Harshman (February 18, 1939 – September 10, 2025), known professionally as Bobby Hart, were an American duo of singer-songwriters. In addition to three top-40 hits as artists, the duo is well known for its songwriting for the Monkees.

== Early years ==
Hart's father was a church minister and he himself served in the Army after leaving high school. Upon discharge, he travelled to Los Angeles seeking a career as a singer. Boyce was separately pursuing a career as a songwriter. After being rejected numerous times, Boyce took his father's suggestion to write a song called "Be My Guest" for rock and roll star Fats Domino. He waited six hours at Domino's hotel room to present him with the demo, and got Domino to promise to listen to the song. Released in 1959, the song hit No. 8 in the US and No. 11 in the UK, becoming Domino's biggest hit there in several years, and sold over a million copies. Boyce also found success as the co-writer, with Curtis Lee, of Lee's 1961 hits "Pretty Little Angel Eyes" and "Under the Moon of Love".

Boyce met Hart in 1959, and the following year played guitar on Hart's single "Girl in the Window", which flopped, but marked the first time he used the name Bobby Hart, since his manager shortened his surname from Harshman to fit the label. Their partnership made a breakthrough with a song recorded by Chubby Checker, "Lazy Elsie Molly", in 1964. They went on to write hits for Jay & the Americans ("Come a Little Bit Closer"), Paul Revere & the Raiders ("(I'm Not Your) Steppin' Stone"), and the Leaves ("Words"). The latter two songs provided the Monkees with hit B-sides in 1967. The duo also wrote the theme song of the daytime soap Days of Our Lives. At one point in this period, Hart also co-wrote "Hurt So Bad" for Little Anthony & the Imperials with Teddy Randazzo and his regular songwriting partner Bobby Weinstein. Boyce co-wrote the song "Hello Pretty Girl", which was a minor hit for singer Ronnie Dove, with Wes Farrell. Boyce also co-wrote the hit "Peaches 'N' Cream" by the Ikettes.

== The Monkees ==
In late 1965, they wrote, produced and performed the soundtrack of the pilot for The Monkees, including singing lead vocals (which were later replaced, once the show was cast). In 1966, despite some conflicts with Don Kirshner, who was the show's musical supervisor, they were retained in essentially the same role. It was Boyce and Hart who wrote, produced and recorded, accompanied by their backing band, the Candy Store Prophets, backing tracks for a large portion of the first season of The Monkees, and the band's accompanying debut album.

The Monkees themselves re-recorded their vocals over Boyce and Hart's when it came time to release the songs, including both "(Theme from) The Monkees" and "Last Train to Clarksville", the latter being a huge hit. Kirshner suddenly relieved Boyce and Hart as producers, by claiming they were using studio time booked for Monkees songs to record tracks for their own solo project.

After their departure from the Monkees, and the negative publicity that erupted when word got out that the band had not played the instruments on their early records, Boyce and Hart were unsure how the Monkees felt about them personally. Attending one of their concerts, though, the duo was spotted in the audience, and singer Davy Jones invited them onstage to introduce them: "These are the fellows who wrote our great hits — Tommy and Bobby!" Every original Monkees album (except for the Head soundtrack, Justus, and Christmas Party) included Boyce and Hart songs.

== Other successes ==
While working with The Monkees, Boyce and Hart embarked on a successful career as recording artists in their own right, releasing three albums on A&M Records: Test Patterns, I Wonder What She's Doing Tonight, and It's All Happening on the Inside (released in Canada as Which One's Boyce and Which One's Hart?). The duo also had five charting singles; the most well-known of these was "I Wonder What She's Doing Tonight", which reached No. 8 in early 1968. It sold over one million copies and was awarded a gold disc. "Out & About" (#39) and "Alice Long" (#27) were their other Top 40 hits.

The duo also performed "I'll Blow You a Kiss in the Wind" (Note: aka "I'm Gonna Blow You a Kiss in the Wind".) on the television show Bewitched, in one of several TV series appearances that included guest spots on The Flying Nun and I Dream of Jeannie ("Jeannie the Hip Hippie" performing "Girl, I'm Out To Get You"). All of these shows were produced by Screen Gems, the television subsidiary of Columbia Pictures. Each of the three sitcom guest appearances featured their music, including two unreleased covers they performed on The Flying Nun.

Boyce and Hart had filmed video promos for their songs "Out and About" and "Alice Long".

Boyce and Hart were involved in producing music for Columbia Pictures' motion pictures during the mid-late 1960s, including two Matt Helm movies (The Ambushers and Murderers' Row), Winter A-Go-Go and Where Angels Go, Trouble Follows. They also provided the music score for a TV movie called Three's a Crowd starring Larry Hagman and Jessica Walter. Boyce and Hart did promos for the U.S. Army Reserve and Coca-Cola. This included the creation of two Coca-Cola commercial jingles, one being a powerful psychedelic song, "Wake Up Girl", while the other was their single "Smilin'" with totally different lyrics.

In 1971 a sitcom named Getting Together appeared on ABC-TV, starring Bobby Sherman and Wes Stern as two struggling songwriters, who were friends of The Partridge Family (and were introduced on their show in the last episode of the show's first season). The series was reportedly based loosely on Boyce and Hart's partnership. At this point, they decided to work on various solo projects. Hart co-wrote the 1974 Helen Reddy hit "Keep On Singing" with Danny Janssen.

== Dolenz, Jones, Boyce, and Hart ==
In the mid-1970s, Boyce and Hart reunited with Davy Jones and Micky Dolenz, performing the songs Boyce and Hart had written for The Monkees a decade before. Legally prohibited from using the Monkees name, they called themselves Dolenz, Jones, Boyce & Hart. The group toured amusement parks and other venues throughout America, Japan and other locations from July 4, 1975, to early 1977, also becoming the first American band to play in Thailand. Signed to Capitol Records by Al Coury, the group released an album of new material in 1976. (A live album was also recorded in Japan, but was not released in the United States until the mid-1990s.) The tours coincided with the syndication of The Monkees TV series, and helped boost sales of Arista's The Monkees Greatest Hits.

Dolenz, Jones, Boyce and Hart also starred in their own TV special called The Great Golden Hits of the Monkees Show, which appeared in syndication. It featured a medley of other Boyce and Hart songs, as well as the songs they had produced for the Monkees. It did not include any songs from their new album.

== Later years ==
Boyce released an album under the pseudonym Christopher Cloud in 1973. He produced several hit records for the UK rock n roll revival group Darts including, "Daddy Cool/The Girl Can't Help It", "Come Back My Love" and "It's Raining". In 1979, he formed his own band, called The Tommy Band, and toured the UK as support for Andrew Matheson (ex-Hollywood Brats). The tour was largely ignored by the public, especially in Middlesbrough where reportedly just one person paid to watch the show.

During that same year (1979), The First Bobby Hart Solo Album was released in Europe on WEA. The group included: Bobby Hart on keyboard and vocals, Victor Vanacore on keyboards, Larry Taylor on bass, Vince Megna on guitar, John Hoke on drums, and "Blue Jay" Patton on saxophone. Five years later, in 1983, Hart was nominated for an Oscar for his song "Over You", written for the film Tender Mercies.

Boyce and Hart reunited during the 1980s resurgence of the Monkees, and performed live.

After a stint living in the UK, Boyce returned to live in Memphis, where he taught songwriting on Beale Street, and Nashville, Tennessee. But he struggled with depression, and later had a brain aneurysm. On November 23, 1994, he died by suicide by gunshot. He was 55 years old.

Hart died on September 10, 2025, at the age of 86.

According to the Rolling Stone Encyclopedia of Rock & Roll, Boyce and Hart wrote more than 300 songs, and sold more than 42 million records as a partnership.

== Discography ==
=== Albums ===
- Test Patterns (A&M LP 126 (Mono)/SP 4126 (Stereo), 1967, US No. 200)
- I Wonder What She's Doing Tonite? (A&M LP 143/SP 4143, 1968, US No. 109)
- It's All Happening On The Inside* (A&M SP 4162, 1968)
- Dolenz, Jones, Boyce & Hart (Capitol ST-11513, 1976)
- Dolenz, Jones, Boyce & Hart – Live in Japan (Capitol/Toshiba-EMI ECS-91018, 1981)
- 16 Rarities (SG Records, 1981 – This is a bootleg of B-sides and oddities)
- The Anthology (A&M Records Australia/Polygram 525 193–2, 1995)

Album Notes

- It's All Happening on the Inside was released in Canada as Which One's Boyce & Which One's Hart? (A&M Records SP 4162)

=== Singles ===
Year	Single (A-side, B-side) Both sides from same album except where indicated	US Billboard charts	Album
1967	"Out & About" b/w "My Little Chickadee"	39	Test Patterns
1967	"Sometimes She's A Little Girl" b/w "Love Every Day" (from I Wonder What She's Doing Tonite)	110	Test Patterns
1967	"I Wonder What She's Doing Tonight" b/w "The Ambushers" (Non-album track)	8	I Wonder What She's Doing Tonite
1968	"Goodbye Baby (I Don't Want To See You Cry)" b/w "Where Angels Go, Trouble Follows" (Non-album track)	53	I Wonder What She's Doing Tonite
1968	"Alice Long (You're Still My Favorite Girlfriend)" b/w "P.O. Box 9847" (Non-album track)	27	It's All Happening on the Inside
1968	"We're All Going to the Same Place" b/w "Six + Six" (Non-album track)	123	It's All Happening on the Inside
1969	"L.U.V. (Let Us Vote)" b/w "I Wanna Be Free" (from I Wonder What She's Doing Tonite)	111	Non-album tracks
1969	"I'm Gonna Blow You A Kiss in the Wind" b/w "Smilin'"		Non-album tracks
Dolenz, Jones, Boyce & Hart
1975	"I Remember The Feeling" b/w "You and I"		Dolenz, Jones, Boyce & Hart
1976	"I Love You (and I'm Glad That I Said It)" b/w "Savin' My Love For You"		Dolenz, Jones, Boyce & Hart

Singles notes:

- "L.U.V. (Let Us Vote)" was the official campaign song for the Let Us Vote movement to lower the voting age to 18.
- "P.O. Box 9847" and "I Wanna Be Free" were originally released by The Monkees.
- "You and I" (DJB&H) was later re-recorded and released in 1996 by The Monkees.
- "I'll Blow You A Kiss In The Wind" was featured on the Bewitched episode "Serena Stops the Show", aired on February 19, 1970, on which Boyce and Hart appeared as themselves. The episode also features Elizabeth Montgomery's performance (as Serena) of the song.
- "The Ambushers" and "Where Angels Go, Trouble Follows" are Columbia Pictures movie theme titles.

Tommy Boyce Singles:

- Along Came Linda (1962, US 118)
- I'll Remember Carol (1962, US 80)
- Have You Had A Change of Heart (1962, US MV 146)
- Sunday, the Day Before Monday (1966, US 132)

Bobby Hart Singles:

- Lovers for the Night (1980, US 110)
