= List of songs recorded by the Monkees =

This list documents every song released by American pop rock band The Monkees. It does not include songs released only separately by the individual members.

== Official Monkees songs ==
| Song | Year | Album debut | Songwriter(s) | Lead vocal(s) | Ref. |
|---|---|---|---|---|---|
| "99 Pounds" | 1967 | Changes | Jeff Barry | Davy Jones | |
| "Acapulco Sun" | 1970 | Changes | Ned Albright, Steven Soles | Micky Dolenz | |
| "Admiral Mike" | 1996 | Justus | Michael Nesmith | Micky Dolenz | |
| "All Alone in the Dark" | 1970 | Changes | Ned Albright, Steven Soles | Micky Dolenz, with Unknown | |
| "All of Your Toys" | 1967 | Missing Links | Bill Martin | Micky Dolenz | |
| "All the King's Horses" | 1966 | Missing Links Volume Two | Michael Nesmith | Micky Dolenz, with Michael Nesmith | |
| "Alvin" | 1968 | The Birds, The Bees & The Monkees - 1994 Rhino CD reissue (bonus track) | Nicholas Thorkelson | Peter Tork | |
| "Angel Band" | 1969 | Missing Links Volume Three | Traditional, arr. William Bradbury, Jefferson Hascall | Michael Nesmith | |
| "Angels We Have Heard on High" | 2018 | Christmas Party | Traditional, lyrics by James Chadwick, arr. James Lee Stanley, Peter Tork | Peter Tork | |
| "Anytime, Anyplace, Anywhere" | 1986 | Then & Now... The Best of The Monkees | Dick Eastman, Bobby Hart | Micky Dolenz | |
| "Apples, Peaches, Bananas and Pears" | 1966 | Missing Links | Tommy Boyce, Bobby Hart | Micky Dolenz | |
| "As We Go Along" | 1968 | Head | Carole King, Toni Stern | Micky Dolenz | |
| "Auntie's Municipal Court" | 1968 | The Birds, The Bees & The Monkees | Keith Allison, Michael Nesmith | Micky Dolenz, with Michael Nesmith | |
| "Band 6" | 1967 | Headquarters | Micky Dolenz, Davy Jones, Michael Nesmith, Peter Tork | Micky Dolenz, Chip Douglas | |
| "Banjo Jam" | 1967 | The Headquarters Sessions | – | Unknown | |
| "A Better World" | 2016 | Good Times! (bonus track) | Nick Thorkelson | Peter Tork | |
| "Birth of an Accidental Hipster" | 2016 | Good Times! | Noel Gallagher, Paul Weller | Michael Nesmith, with Micky Dolenz | |
| "Black and Blue" | 1967 | Headquarters (2022 Super Deluxe CD Reissue) | Neil Diamond, Jerry Leiber, Mike Stoller | – | |
| "Blues" | 1967 | The Headquarters Sessions | – | Micky Dolenz | |
| "Bye Bye Baby Bye Bye" | 1969 | The Monkees Present | Micky Dolenz, Ric Klein | Micky Dolenz | |
| "California Here I Come" (w/ alternate lyrics): The End theme to 33 1/3 Revolutions Per Monkee) | 1968 | Head (2010 Rhino Handmade deluxe CD reissue) | Buddy DeSylva, Joseph Meyer (original song) | Peter Tork | |
| "Calico Girlfriend Samba" | 1969 | The Monkees Present - 1994 Rhino CD reissue (bonus track) | Michael Nesmith | Michael Nesmith | |
| "Can You Dig It?" | 1968 | Head | Peter Tork | Micky Dolenz, with Peter Tork | |
| "Cantata and Fugue in C and W (Six-String Improvisation)" | 1967 | The Headquarters Sessions | Michael Nesmith | – | |
| "Carlisle Wheeling" (first recorded version) | 1967 | Missing Links | Michael Nesmith | Michael Nesmith | |
| "Ceiling in My Room" | 1967 | I'm a Believer and Other Hits | Dominick DeMieri, Robert Dick, Davy Jones | Davy Jones | |
| "Changes" | 1968 | Missing Links Volume Two | David Jones, Steve Pitts | Davy Jones | |
| "Christmas Is My Time of Year" (Micky Dolenz, Davy Jones & Peter Tork) | 1976 | Christmas Party (bonus track) | Howard Kaylan, Chip Douglas | Micky Dolenz, Davy Jones | |
| "Christmas Party" (features audio sourced from The Monkees episode "The Christmas Show", filmed November 22, 1967) | 2018 | Christmas Party | Peter Buck, Scott McCaughey | Micky Dolenz | |
| "The Christmas Song" | 2018 | Christmas Party | Bob Wells, Mel Tormé | Michael Nesmith | |
| "Circle Sky" | 1967 | Head | Michael Nesmith | Michael Nesmith | |
| "Circle Sky" (remake w/alternate lyrics ) | 1996 | Justus | Michael Nesmith | Michael Nesmith | |
| "Come On In" | 1968 | Missing Links Volume Two | Jo Mapes | Peter Tork | |
| "Counting on You" | 1987 | Pool It! | Alan Green | Davy Jones | |
| "Cripple Creek" (live version) | 1967 | Live 1967 | Traditional | Peter Tork | |
| "The Crippled Lion" | 1968 | Missing Links Volume Two | Michael Nesmith | Michael Nesmith | |
| "Cuddly Toy" | 1967 | Pisces, Aquarius, Capricorn & Jones Ltd. | Harry Nilsson | Davy Jones | |
| "D. W. Washburn" | 1968 | The Monkees' Golden Album, Volume Two | Jerry Leiber, Mike Stoller | Micky Dolenz | |
| "Daddy's Song" | 1968 | Head | Harry Nilsson | Davy Jones | |
| "Daily Nightly" | 1967 | Pisces, Aquarius, Capricorn & Jones Ltd. | Michael Nesmith | Micky Dolenz | |
| "Dandruff?" | 1968 | Head | Jack Nicholson, Bob Rafelson | Micky Dolenz, Davy Jones, Michael Nesmith, Peter Tork, Charles Macaulay, Bob Rafelson, Logan Ramsey | |
| "The Day We Fall in Love" | 1966 | More of the Monkees | Sandy Linzer, Denny Randell | Davy Jones | |
| "Daydream Believer" | 1967 | The Birds, The Bees & The Monkees | John Stewart | Davy Jones | |
| "Ditty Diego – War Chant" | 1968 | Head | Jack Nicholson, Bob Rafelson | Michael Nesmith, Peter Tork, Micky Dolenz, Davy Jones | |
| "Do It in the Name of Love" (Micky Dolenz & Davy Jones) | 1970 | Listen to the Band | Bobby Bloom, Neil Goldberg | Micky Dolenz, Davy Jones | |
| "Do You Feel It Too?" | 1970 | Changes | Jeff Barry, Andy Kim | Davy Jones | |
| "Don't Be Cruel" | 1967 | The Headquarters Sessions | Otis Blackwell | – | |
| "Don't Bring Me Down" | 1987 | Pool It! | Tommy James, Tom Teeley, Glenn Wyka | Micky Dolenz | |
| "Don't Call on Me" | 1967 | Pisces, Aquarius, Capricorn & Jones Ltd. | Michael Nesmith, John London | Michael Nesmith | |
| "Don't Listen to Linda" | 1967 | Instant Replay | Tommy Boyce, Bobby Hart | Davy Jones | |
| "Don't Wait for Me" | 1968 | Instant Replay | Michael Nesmith | Michael Nesmith | |
| "The Door Into Summer" | 1967 | Pisces, Aquarius, Capricorn & Jones Ltd. | Bill Martin | Michael Nesmith, with Micky Dolenz | |
| "Dream World" | 1968 | The Birds, The Bees & The Monkees | David Jones, Steve Pitts | Davy Jones | |
| "Dyin' of a Broken Heart" | 1996 | Justus | Micky Dolenz | Micky Dolenz | |
| "Early Morning Blues and Greens" | 1967 | Headquarters | Diane Hildebrand, Jack Keller | Davy Jones | |
| "Eve of My Sorrow" | 1967 | Headquarters (2022 Super Deluxe CD Reissue) | Jeff Barry, Jerry Leiber, Joey Levine, Mike Stoller | – | |
| "Every Step of the Way" | 1987 | Pool It! | Mark Clarke, Ian Hunter | Davy Jones | |
| "Fever" | 1967 | The Headquarters Sessions | – | Micky Dolenz, Peter Tork | |
| "For Pete's Sake (Closing Theme)" | 1967 | Headquarters | Joseph Richards, Peter Tork | Micky Dolenz | |
| "Forget that Girl" | 1967 | Headquarters | Douglas Farthing Hatlelid | Davy Jones | |
| "French Song" | 1969 | The Monkees Present | Bill Chadwick | Davy Jones | |
| "Gettin' In" | 1987 | Pool It! | Peter Tork | Peter Tork | |
| "Girl" (live version) | 1995 | Together Again | Charles Fox, Norman Gimbel | Davy Jones | |
| "The Girl I Knew Somewhere" | 1967 | The Monkees' Golden Album | Michael Nesmith | Micky Dolenz | |
| "The Girl I Left Behind Me" | 1968 | Instant Replay | Carole Bayer Sager, Neil Sedaka | Davy Jones | |
| "Goin' Down" | 1967 | Monkeemania (40 Timeless Hits) | Diane Hildebrand, with Micky Dolenz, David Jones, Michael Nesmith, Peter Tork | Micky Dolenz | |
| "Goldilocks Sometime": musical number for 33 1/3 Revolutions Per Monkee TV Special | 1968 | Instant Replay (2011 Rhino Handmade deluxe CD reissue) | Bill Dorsey | Davy Jones | |
| "Gonna Build a Mountain" (live version) | 1967 | Live 1967 | Leslie Bricusse, Anthony Newley | Davy Jones | |
| "Gonna Buy Me a Dog" | 1966 | The Monkees | Tommy Boyce, Bobby Hart | Micky Dolenz, Davy Jones | |
| "Good Clean Fun" | 1968 | The Monkees Present | Michael Nesmith | Michael Nesmith | |
| "The Good Earth" | 1969 | The Monkees Present - 1994 Rhino CD reissue (bonus track) | Ben Nisbet | Davy Jones | |
| "Good Times!" | 1968 | Good Times! | Harry Nilsson | Micky Dolenz, with Harry Nilsson | |
| "Gotta Give It Time" | 1967 | Good Times! | Jeff Barry, Jerry Leiber, Joey Levine, Mike Stoller | Micky Dolenz | |
| "Gravy" | 1968 | Head | Jack Nicholson, Bob Rafelson | Davy Jones, I. J. Jefferson | |
| "Happy Birthday to You" | 1968 | Head - 1994 Rhino CD reissue (bonus track) | Mildred J. Hill, Patty Smith Hill | Micky Dolenz, Davy Jones, Peter Tork | |
| "Hard to Believe" | 1967 | Pisces, Aquarius, Capricorn & Jones Ltd. | Eddie Brick, Kim Capli, David Jones, Charlie Rockett | Davy Jones | |
| "Head Radio Spot" | 1968 | Head - 1994 Rhino CD reissue (bonus track) | Jack Nicholson, Bob Rafelson | Timothy Carey, June Fairchild, Teri Garr, Charles Irving, I. J. Jefferson, Charles Macaulay, Ray Nitschke, Unknown | |
| "Heart and Soul" | 1987 | Pool It! | Simon Byrne, Andrew Howell | Micky Dolenz | |
| "Hold on Girl (Help is on its Way)" | 1966 | More of the Monkees | Billy Carr, Jack Keller, Ben Raleigh | Davy Jones | |
| "Hollywood" | 1968 | Missing Links Volume Three | Michael Nesmith | Michael Nesmith | |
| "House of Broken Gingerbread" | 2018 | Christmas Party | Michael Chabon, Adam Schlesinger | Micky Dolenz | |
| "How Insensitive" | 1968 | Missing Links Volume Three | Antônio Carlos Jobim, Vinícius de Moraes, Norman Gimbel | Michael Nesmith | |
| "I Believe You" | 1996 | Justus | Peter Tork | Peter Tork | |
| "I Can't Get Her off My Mind" | 1967 | Headquarters | Tommy Boyce, Bobby Hart | Davy Jones | |
| "I Didn't Know You Had It in You Sally (You're a Real Ball of Fire)" | 1967 | Headquarters (2022 Super Deluxe CD Reissue) | Sandy Linzer, Denny Randell | Micky Dolenz | |
| "I Don't Think You Know Me" (first recorded version) | 1966 | Missing Links | Gerry Goffin, Carole King | Michael Nesmith, with Micky Dolenz | |
| "I Go Ape": musical number for 33 1/3 Revolutions Per Monkee TV Special | 1968 | Instant Replay (2011 Rhino Handmade deluxe CD reissue) | Neil Sedaka | Micky Dolenz | |
| "I Got a Woman" (live version) | 1967 | Live 1967 | Ray Charles, Renald Richard | Micky Dolenz | |
| "I Know What I Know" | 2016 | Good Times! | Michael Nesmith | Michael Nesmith | |
| "I Love You Better" | 1970 | Changes | Jeff Barry, Andy Kim | Micky Dolenz | |
| "I Never Thought It Peculiar" | 1966 | Changes | Tommy Boyce, Bobby Hart | Davy Jones | |
| "(I Prithee) Do Not Ask for Love" | 1966 | Missing Links Volume Two | Michael Martin Murphey | Micky Dolenz | |
| "I Wanna Be Free" | 1966 | The Monkees | Tommy Boyce, Bobby Hart | Davy Jones | |
| "I Wanna Be Your Puppy Dog" | 1967 | Headquarters (2022 Super Deluxe CD Reissue) | Sandy Linzer, Denny Randell | – | |
| "I Was Born in East Virginia" | 1967 | The Headquarters Sessions | Traditional | Micky Dolenz, Peter Tork, Unknown | |
| "I Was There (And I'm Told I Had a Good Time)" | 2016 | Good Times! | Micky Dolenz, Adam Schlesinger | Micky Dolenz | |
| "I Wish It Could Be Christmas Every Day" | 2018 | Christmas Party | Roy Wood | Micky Dolenz | |
| "I Won't Be the Same Without Her" | 1966 | Instant Replay | Gerry Goffin, Carole King | Michael Nesmith, with Micky Dolenz | |
| "(I'd Go the) Whole Wide World" | 1987 | Pool It! | Eric Goulden | Micky Dolenz | |
| "I'll Be Back Up on My Feet" | 1968 | The Birds, The Bees & The Monkees | Sandy Linzer, Denny Randell | Micky Dolenz | |
| "I'll Be True to You" | 1966 | The Monkees | Gerry Goffin, Russ Titelman | Davy Jones | |
| "(I'll) Love You Forever" | 1987 | Pool It! | David Jones | Davy Jones | |
| "I'll Spend My Life with You" | 1967 | Headquarters | Tommy Boyce, Bobby Hart | Micky Dolenz, with Peter Tork | |
| "I'm a Believer" | 1966 | More of the Monkees | Neil Diamond | Micky Dolenz | |
| "I'm Gonna Try" | 1968 | The Birds, The Bees & The Monkees - 1994 Rhino CD reissue (bonus track) | David Jones, Steven Pitts | Davy Jones, with Unknown | |
| "(I'm Not Your) Steppin' Stone" | 1966 | More of the Monkees | Tommy Boyce, Bobby Hart | Micky Dolenz | |
| "If I Ever Get to Saginaw Again" | 1968 | Missing Links Volume Two | Jack Keller, Bob Russell | Michael Nesmith | |
| "If I Knew" | 1969 | The Monkees Present | Bill Chadwick, David Jones | Davy Jones | |
| "If I Learned to Play the Violin" | 1967 | Headquarters (2007 Deluxe CD Reissue) | Joey Levine, Artie Resnick | Davy Jones | |
| "If You Have the Time" | 1969 | Missing Links | Bill Chadwick, David Jones | Davy Jones | |
| "It's Got to Be Love" | 1970 | Changes | Neil Goldberg | Micky Dolenz | |
| "It's My Life" | 1996 | Justus | Micky Dolenz | Micky Dolenz | |
| "It's Nice to Be with You" | 1968 | Monkee Business | Jerry Goldstein | Davy Jones | |
| "It's Not Too Late" | 1996 | Justus | David Jones | Davy Jones | |
| "Jesus Christ" | 2018 | Christmas Party | Alex Chilton | Micky Dolenz | |
| "Joshua Fit the Battle of Jericho" | 1967 | Headquarters - 1995 Rhino CD reissue (bonus track) | Traditional, arr. Micky Dolenz, David Jones, Peter Tork, Chip Douglas | Micky Dolenz, Peter Tork, with Chip Douglas | |
| "Just a Game" | 1968 | Instant Replay | Micky Dolenz | Micky Dolenz | |
| "Kellogg's Jingle" | 1966 | Missing Links Volume Three | – | Micky Dolenz | |
| "Kicks" | 1986 | Then & Now... The Best of The Monkees | Barry Mann, Cynthia Weil | Micky Dolenz | |
| "The Kind of Girl I Could Love" | 1966 | More of the Monkees | Roger Atkins, Michael Nesmith | Michael Nesmith | |
| "Ladies Aid Society" | 1966 | The Monkees Present | Tommy Boyce, Bobby Hart | Davy Jones | |
| "Lady Jane" | 1970 | Changes - 1994 Rhino CD reissue (bonus track) | Bobby Bloom, Neil Goldberg | Davy Jones, Micky Dolenz | |
| "Lady's Baby" | 1967 | Missing Links | Peter Tork | Peter Tork | |
| "Last Train to Clarksville" | 1966 | The Monkees | Tommy Boyce, Bobby Hart | Micky Dolenz | |
| "Laugh" | 1966 | More of the Monkees | Phil Margo, Mitch Margo, Hank Medress, Jay Siegel | Davy Jones | |
| "Laurel and Hardy" | 1968 | The Birds, The Bees & The Monkees (2010 Rhino Handmade Deluxe CD reissue) | Jan Berry and Roger Christian | Davy Jones | |
| "Let's Dance On" | 1966 | The Monkees | Tommy Boyce, Bobby Hart | Micky Dolenz | |
| "Listen to the Band" | 1968 | The Monkees Present | Michael Nesmith | Michael Nesmith | |
| "A Little Bit Me, A Little Bit You" | 1967 | The Monkees' Golden Album | Neil Diamond | Davy Jones | |
| "Little Girl" | 1969 | The Monkees Present | Micky Dolenz | Micky Dolenz | |
| "Little Girl (Sunny Side Up)" | 2016 | Good Times! | Peter Tork | Peter Tork | |
| "Little Red Rider" | 1969 | Missing Links Volume Three | Michael Nesmith | Michael Nesmith | |
| "Long Title: Do I Have to Do This All Over Again" | 1968 | Head | Peter Tork | Peter Tork | |
| "Long Way Home" | 1987 | Pool It! | Dick Eastman, Bobby Hart | Davy Jones | |
| "Look Down" | 1968 | Missing Links Volume Three | Carole King, Toni Stern | Davy Jones | |
| "Look Out (Here Comes Tomorrow)" | 1966 | More of the Monkees | Neil Diamond | Davy Jones | |
| "Looking for the Good Times" | 1966 | The Monkees Present | Tommy Boyce, Bobby Hart | Davy Jones, with Micky Dolenz | |
| "Love is on the Way" | 1967 | Headquarters (2022 Super Deluxe CD Reissue) | Sandy Linzer, Denny Randell | – | |
| "Love is only Sleeping" | 1967 | Pisces, Aquarius, Capricorn & Jones Ltd. | Barry Mann, Cynthia Weil | Michael Nesmith, with Micky Dolenz | |
| "Love to Love" | 1967 | Monkeemania (40 Timeless Hits) (also overdubbed and re-released on Good Times!) | Neil Diamond | Davy Jones | |
| "The Love You Got Inside" | 1967 | Headquarters (2022 Super Deluxe CD Reissue) | Jeff Barry, Andy Kim, Jerry Leiber, Mike Stoller | – | |
| "Love's What I Want" | 2016 | Good Times! (bonus track) | Andy Partridge | Micky Dolenz | |
| "MGBGT" (live version) | 1986 | Live! | Peter Tork | Peter Tork | |
| "Magnolia Simms" | 1967 | The Birds, The Bees & The Monkees | Michael Nesmith | Michael Nesmith | |
| "A Man Without a Dream" | 1968 | Instant Replay | Gerry Goffin, Carole King | Davy Jones | |
| "Mary, Mary" | 1966 | More of the Monkees | Michael Nesmith | Micky Dolenz | |
| "Masking Tape" | 1967 | The Headquarters Sessions | Unknown, credited to Barry Mann, Cynthia Weil | Micky Dolenz, Michael Nesmith, Peter Tork, Unknown | |
| "Me & Magdalena" | 2016 | Good Times! | Ben Gibbard | Michael Nesmith, with Micky Dolenz | |
| "Me Without You" | 1968 | Instant Replay | Tommy Boyce, Bobby Hart | Davy Jones | |
| "Mele Kalikimaka" (new music played to an archived vocal track) | 1991 | Christmas Party | Robert Alexander Anderson | Davy Jones | |
| "Memphis, Tennessee" | 1967 | The Headquarters Sessions | Chuck Berry | Micky Dolenz, Peter Tork, Unknown | |
| "Merry Christmas, Baby" | 2018 | Christmas Party | Lou Baxter, Johnny Moore | Micky Dolenz | |
| "Merry Go Round" | 1968 | Missing Links Volume Three | Diane Hildebrand, Peter Tork | Peter Tork | |
| "Michigan Blackhawk" | 1969 | – | Michael Nesmith | Michael Nesmith | |
| "Michigan Blackhawk" (a.k.a. "Down the Highway") | 1969 | Missing Links Volume Two | Gerry Goffin, Carole King, Toni Stern | Michael Nesmith | |
| "Midnight (When It All Comes Down)" | 1987 | Pool It! | John David | Micky Dolenz | |
| "Midnight Train" | 1969 | Changes | Micky Dolenz | Micky Dolenz | |
| "Mommy and Daddy" | 1968 | The Monkees Present | Micky Dolenz | Micky Dolenz | |
| "The Monkees Present – Radio Promo" | 1969 | The Monkees Present - 1994 Rhino CD reissue (bonus track) | – | Unknown | |
| "Mr. Webster" | 1967 | Headquarters | Tommy Boyce, Bobby Hart | Micky Dolenz | |
| "My Share of the Sidewalk" | 1968 | Missing Links | Michael Nesmith | Davy Jones | |
| "Naked Persimmon": musical number for 33 1/3 Revolutions Per Monkee TV Special | 1968 | Instant Replay (2011 Rhino Handmade deluxe CD reissue) | Michael Nesmith | Michael Nesmith | |
| "Never Enough" | 1996 | Justus | Micky Dolenz | Micky Dolenz, with Davy Jones | |
| "Never Tell a Woman Yes" | 1969 | The Monkees Present | Michael Nesmith | Michael Nesmith | |
| "Nine Times Blue" | 1968 | Missing Links | Michael Nesmith | Michael Nesmith | |
| "No Time" | 1967 | Headquarters | Micky Dolenz, Michael Nesmith, with Davy Jones, Peter Tork | Micky Dolenz | |
| "Of You" | 1966 | Missing Links | Bill Chadwick, John Chadwick | Michael Nesmith, with Micky Dolenz | |
| "Oh My My" | 1970 | Changes | Jeff Barry, Andy Kim | Micky Dolenz | |
| "Oh, What a Night" | 1996 | Justus | David Jones | Davy Jones | |
| "Oklahoma Backroom Dancer" | 1969 | The Monkees Present | Michael Martin Murphey | Michael Nesmith | |
| "Oliver Medley" (Consider Yourself, I'd Do Anything, Who Will Buy?) (live version) | 2001 | 2001: Live in Las Vegas | Lionel Bart | Davy Jones | |
| "Opening Ceremony" | 1968 | Head | Jack Nicholson, Bob Rafelson | Charles Irving, with Timothy Carey, June Fairchild, Teri Garr, I. J. Jefferson, Charles Macaulay, Ray Nitschke, Unknown | |
| "Our Own World" | 2016 | Good Times! | Adam Schlesinger | Micky Dolenz | |
| "P.O. Box 9847" | 1967 | The Birds, The Bees & The Monkees | Tommy Boyce, Bobby Hart | Micky Dolenz | |
| "Papa Gene's Blues" | 1966 | The Monkees | Michael Nesmith | Michael Nesmith | |
| "Party" | 1968 | Missing Links | David Jones, Steve Pitts | Davy Jones | |
| "Penny Music" | 1969 | Missing Links Volume Three | Michael Leonard, John Stroll, Bobby Weinstein | Davy Jones | |
| "Peter Gunn's Gun" | 1967 | Headquarters - 1995 Rhino CD reissue (bonus track) | Henry Mancini | Micky Dolenz, Michael Nesmith, Peter Tork | |
| "Peter Percival Patterson's Pet Pig Porky" | 1967 | Pisces, Aquarius, Capricorn & Jones Ltd. | Public Domain, arr. Peter Tork | Peter Tork | |
| "Pillow Time" | 1969 | The Monkees Present | Janelle Scott, Matt Willis | Micky Dolenz | |
| "Pleasant Valley Sunday" | 1967 | Pisces, Aquarius, Capricorn & Jones Ltd. | Gerry Goffin, Carole King | Micky Dolenz | |
| "Poll" | 1968 | Head | Jack Nicholson, Bob Rafelson | Davy Jones, Michael Nesmith, Peter Tork, Timothy Carey, Frank Zappa, Unknown | |
| "Poor Little Me" | 1967 | Headquarters (2022 Super Deluxe CD Reissue) | Jeff Barry, Andy Kim | – | |
| "Porpoise Song" | 1968 | Head | Gerry Goffin, Carole King | Micky Dolenz, with Davy Jones | |
| "The Poster" | 1968 | The Birds, The Bees & The Monkees | David Jones, Steve Pitts | Davy Jones | |
| "Propinquity (I've Just Begun to Care)" | 1968 | Missing Links Volume Three | Michael Nesmith | Michael Nesmith | |
| "Randy Scouse Git" (a.k.a. "Alternate Title") | 1967 | Headquarters | Micky Dolenz | Micky Dolenz | |
| "Regional Girl" | 1996 | Justus | Micky Dolenz | Micky Dolenz | |
| "Ride Baby Ride" | 1970 | – | Unknown | Unknown | |
| "Riu Chiu" | 1967 | Missing Links Volume Two | Traditional, attributed to Mateo Flecha | Micky Dolenz, with Michael Nesmith, Peter Tork, Chip Douglas | |
| "Rosemarie" | 1968 | Missing Links | Micky Dolenz | Micky Dolenz | |
| "Run Away from Life" | 1996 | Justus | Peter Tork | Davy Jones | |
| "Salesman" | 1967 | Pisces, Aquarius, Capricorn & Jones Ltd. | Craig Vincent Smith | Michael Nesmith | |
| "Saturday's Child" | 1966 | The Monkees | David Gates | Micky Dolenz | |
| "Secret Heart" | 1987 | Pool It! | Brian Fairweather, Martin Page | Micky Dolenz | |
| "Seeger's Theme" | 1968 | Missing Links Volume Two | Pete Seeger | Peter Tork (whistling) | |
| "Shades of Gray" | 1967 | Headquarters | Barry Mann, Cynthia Weil | Davy Jones, Peter Tork | |
| "Shake 'Em Up (and Let 'Em Roll)" | 1968 | Missing Links Volume Three | Jerry Leiber, Mike Stoller | Micky Dolenz | |
| "She" | 1966 | More of the Monkees | Tommy Boyce, Bobby Hart | Micky Dolenz | |
| "(She Calls Herself) St. Matthew" | 1968 | Missing Links Volume Two | Michael Nesmith | Michael Nesmith | |
| "She Hangs Out" | 1967 | Pisces, Aquarius, Capricorn & Jones Ltd. | Jeff Barry, Ellie Greenwich | Davy Jones | |
| "She Makes Me Laugh" | 2016 | Good Times! | Rivers Cuomo | Micky Dolenz | |
| "She'll Be There" | 1967 | Missing Links Volume Three | Raul Abeyta, Sharon Sheeley, arr. Micky Dolenz, Coco Dolenz | Micky Dolenz, with Coco Dolenz | |
| "She's Movin' in with Rico" | 1987 | Pool It! | Eddie Howell | Davy Jones | |
| "She's So Far Out, She's In" | 1967 | The Headquarters Sessions | Thomas Baker Knight | Micky Dolenz, Michael Nesmith, Peter Tork, Chip Douglas | |
| "Shorty Blackwell" | 1968 | Instant Replay | Micky Dolenz | Micky Dolenz | |
| "Silver Bells" (new music played to an archived vocal track) | 1991 | Christmas Party | Jay Livingston, Ray Evans | Davy Jones | |
| "Since You Went Away" | 1987 | Pool It! | Michael Levine | Peter Tork | |
| "Smile" | 1968 | Instant Replay (1995 CD reissue) | David Jones | Davy Jones | |
| "Snowfall" | 2018 | Christmas Party | Claude Thornhill | Michael Nesmith | |
| "So Goes Love" (second recorded version) | 1966 | Missing Links | Gerry Goffin, Carole King | Davy Jones | |
| "Some of Shelly's Blues" | 1968 | Missing Links Volume Two | Michael Nesmith | Michael Nesmith | |
| "Someday Man" | 1968 | The Monkees' Golden Album, Volume Two | Roger Nichols, Paul Williams | Davy Jones | |
| "Sometime in the Morning" | 1966 | More of the Monkees | Gerry Goffin, Carole King | Micky Dolenz | |
| "Special Announcement" | 1967 | Pisces, Aquarius, Capricorn & Jones Ltd. - 1995 Rhino CD reissue (bonus track) | – | Peter Tork | |
| "Star Collector" | 1967 | Pisces, Aquarius, Capricorn & Jones Ltd. | Gerry Goffin, Carole King | Davy Jones, with Micky Dolenz | |
| "Steam Engine" | 1969 | Monkeemania (40 Timeless Hits) | Chip Douglas | Micky Dolenz | |
| "The Story of Rock and Roll" | 1967 | The Headquarters Sessions | Harry Nilsson | Unknown | |
| "Storybook of You" | 1969 | Missing Links | Tommy Boyce, Bobby Hart | Davy Jones | |
| "Sugar Man" | 1967 | Headquarters (2022 Super Deluxe CD Reissue) | Sandy Linzer, Denny Randell | – | |
| "Sunny Girlfriend" | 1967 | Headquarters | Michael Nesmith | Michael Nesmith, with Micky Dolenz | |
| "Superstitious" | 1934 | Head | Peter Ruric | Béla Lugosi, David Manners | |
| "Supplicio" | 1968 | Head | Jack Nicholson, Bob Rafelson | Unknown | |
| "Swami – Plus Strings, Etc." | 1968 | Head | Ken Thorne, arr. Jack Nicholson, Bob Rafelson | Abraham Sofaer, with Micky Dolenz, Timothy Carey, June Fairchild, Teri Garr, Charles Irving, I. J. Jefferson, Charles Macaulay, Ray Nitschke, Unknown | |
| "Sweet Young Thing" | 1966 | The Monkees | Gerry Goffin, Carole King, Michael Nesmith | Michael Nesmith | |
| "Take a Giant Step" | 1966 | The Monkees | Gerry Goffin, Carole King | Micky Dolenz | |
| "Tapioca Tundra" | 1967 | The Birds, The Bees & The Monkees | Michael Nesmith | Michael Nesmith | |
| "Tear Drop City" | 1966 | Instant Replay | Tommy Boyce, Bobby Hart | Micky Dolenz | |
| "Tear the Top Right Off My Head" | 1968 | Listen to the Band | Peter Tork | Peter Tork | |
| "Teeny Tiny Gnome" (a.k.a. "Kicking Stones") | 1966 | Missing Links | Lynn Castle, Wayne Erwin | Micky Dolenz | |
| "Tell Me Love" | 1970 | Changes | Jeff Barry | Micky Dolenz | |
| "Tema Dei Monkees" (Italian version of "(Theme from) The Monkees)") | 1966 | Monkeemania (40 Timeless Hits) | Tommy Boyce, Bobby Hart, Nistri | Micky Dolenz, with Tommy Boyce, Bobby Hart | |
| "Terrifying" | 2016 | Good Times! (bonus track) | Zach Rogue | Micky Dolenz | |
| "That Was Then, This Is Now" (Micky Dolenz & Peter Tork) | 1986 | Then & Now... The Best of The Monkees | Vance Brescia | Micky Dolenz, with Peter Tork | |
| "(Theme from) The Monkees" | 1966 | The Monkees | Tommy Boyce, Bobby Hart | Micky Dolenz | |
| "This Just Doesn't Seem to Be My Day" | 1966 | The Monkees | Tommy Boyce, Bobby Hart | Davy Jones | |
| "Through the Looking Glass" | 1967 | Instant Replay | Red Baldwin, Tommy Boyce, Bobby Hart | Micky Dolenz | |
| "Ticket on a Ferry Ride" | 1970 | Changes | Jeff Barry, Bobby Bloom | Micky Dolenz | |
| "Time and Time Again" | 1969 | Missing Links | Bill Chadwick, David Jones | Davy Jones | |
| "Tomorrow's Gonna Be Another Day" | 1966 | The Monkees | Tommy Boyce, Steve Venet | Micky Dolenz | |
| "Too Much Monkey Business" (live version) | 1994 | Together Again | Chuck Berry | Micky Dolenz | |
| "Twelve-String Improvisation" | 1967 | The Headquarters Sessions | – | Micky Dolenz, Michael Nesmith, Unknown | |
| "Two Part Invention in F Major" | 1967 | The Headquarters Sessions | Johann Sebastian Bach | Michael Nesmith, Peter Tork, Unknown | |
| "Unlucky Stars" | 1996 | Justus | Micky Dolenz | Micky Dolenz | |
| "Until It's Time for You to Go" | 1967 | The Headquarters Sessions | Buffy Sainte-Marie | Michael Nesmith | |
| "Unwrap You At Christmas" | 2018 | Christmas Party | Andy Partridge | Micky Dolenz | |
| "Valleri" | 1967 | The Birds, The Bees & The Monkees | Tommy Boyce, Bobby Hart | Davy Jones | |
| "War Games" | 1968 | Missing Links | David Jones, Steve Pitts | Davy Jones | |
| "Wasn't Born to Follow" | 1968 | Good Times! | Gerry Goffin, Carole King | Peter Tork | |
| "We Were Made for Each Other" | 1968 | The Birds, The Bees & The Monkees | Carole Bayer Sager, George Fischoff | Davy Jones | |
| "We'll Be Back in a Minute" | 1969 | Missing Links Volume Three | Micky Dolenz | Micky Dolenz | |
| "We'll Be Back in a Minute #2" | 1969 | Missing Links Volume Three | Micky Dolenz | Micky Dolenz | |
| "What Am I Doing Hangin' 'Round?" | 1967 | Pisces, Aquarius, Capricorn & Jones Ltd. | Michael Martin Murphey, Owen Castleman | Michael Nesmith | |
| "What Would Santa Do" | 2018 | Christmas Party | Rivers Cuomo | Micky Dolenz | |
| "Whatever's Right" | 2016 | Good Times! | Tommy Boyce, Bobby Hart | Micky Dolenz | |
| "When Love Comes Knockin' (At Your Door)" | 1966 | More of the Monkees | Carole Bayer Sager, Neil Sedaka | Davy Jones | |
| "Which Way (Do You Want It)?" | 1970 | – | Jeff Barry, Bobby Bloom | Micky Dolenz | |
| "While I Cry" | 1968 | Instant Replay | Michael Nesmith | Michael Nesmith | |
| "White Christmas" (Micky Dolenz, Davy Jones & Peter Tork) | 1976 | b/wChristmas Is My Time of Year (single) | Irving Berlin | Davy Jones | |
| "Wind Up Man": musical number for 33 1/3 Revolutions Per Monkee TV Special | 1968 | Instant Replay (2011 Rhino Handmade deluxe CD reissue) | Bill Dorsey | Micky Dolenz | |
| "Wonderful Christmastime" | 2018 | Christmas Party | Paul McCartney | Micky Dolenz | |
| "Words" | 1967 | Pisces, Aquarius, Capricorn & Jones Ltd. | Tommy Boyce, Bobby Hart | Micky Dolenz, Peter Tork | |
| "Writing Wrongs" | 1967 | The Birds, The Bees & The Monkees | Michael Nesmith | Michael Nesmith | |
| "Yardley's Black Label" | 1966 | – | – | Micky Dolenz, Davy Jones, Michael Nesmith, Peter Tork | |
| "You and I" | 1968 | Instant Replay | Bill Chadwick, David Jones | Davy Jones | |
| "You and I" | 1996 | Justus | Micky Dolenz, David Jones | Davy Jones, with Micky Dolenz | |
| "You Bring The Summer" | 2016 | Good Times! | Andy Partridge | Micky Dolenz | |
| "You Can't Judge a Book By Looking at the Cover" (live version) | 1967 | Live 1967 | Willie Dixon | Michael Nesmith | |
| "You Can't Tie a Mustang Down" | 1967 | Daydream Believer and Other Hits | Jeff Barry, Jerry Leiber, Mike Stoller | Davy Jones | |
| "You Just May Be the One" | 1967 | Headquarters | Michael Nesmith | Michael Nesmith, with Micky Dolenz | |
| "You Told Me" | 1967 | Headquarters | Michael Nesmith | Michael Nesmith | |
| "You're So Good" | 1969 | Missing Links Volume Three | Robert Stone | Micky Dolenz | |
| "You're So Good to Me" | 1970 | Changes | Jeff Barry, Bobby Bloom | Davy Jones | |
| "Your Auntie Grizelda" | 1966 | More of the Monkees | Diane Hildebrand, Jack Keller | Peter Tork | |
| "Zilch" | 1967 | Headquarters | Micky Dolenz, Davy Jones, Michael Nesmith, Peter Tork | Peter Tork, Davy Jones, Micky Dolenz, Michael Nesmith | |
| "Zor and Zam" | 1968 | The Birds, The Bees & The Monkees | Bill Chadwick, John Chadwick | Micky Dolenz | |

=== Known unreleased songs ===
| Song | Year | Songwriter(s) | Lead vocal(s) | Notes |
|---|---|---|---|---|
| "Antarctica" | 1997 | Bill Martin | The Monkees | musical number for Hey, Hey It's The Monkees TV Special |
| "At the Hop": musical number for 33 1/3 Revolutions Per Monkee TV Special | 1968 | Artie Singer, John Medora, and David White | Micky Dolenz | part of a medley with other singers ("At the Hop" - The Monkees, "I'm Ready" - Fats Domino, "Whole Lotta Shakin' Goin' On" - Jerry Lee Lewis, "Tutti Frutti" -Little Richard, "Shake a Tail Feather" - We Three & The Monkees, Blue Monday" - Fats Domino, Little Darlin'" - The Monkees, "Long Tall Sally" - Little Richard, "Down the Line" - Down the Line - Jerry Lee Lewis, "Dem Bones" - The Clara Ward Singers) |
| "Cindy" (Peter's solo spot during the Japanese concert of October 1968 recorded for TV - shown only in Japan) | 1968 | Unknown | Peter Tork | The concert audio from the radio simulcast has been released on the bootleg album, "The Monkees Live In Japan 1968" |
| "Happy Xmas (War Is Over)" -as part of a medley | 1986 | John Lennon | The Monkees | From the MTV music video The Monkees Christmas Medley |
| "(Your Love Keeps Lifting Me) Higher and Higher": recorded live 8/31/2001 at the Sun Theater (Anaheim, CA) | 2001 | Carl Smith, Gary Jackson, Raynard Miner | Peter Tork | Not included on the 2003 CD "The Monkees: Live Summer Tour" but was included on the DVD of the concert |
| "I Got a Woman" (Micky's solo spot during the Japanese concert of October 1968 recorded for TV - shown only in Japan) | 1968 | Ray Charles, Renald Richard | Micky Dolenz | The concert audio from the radio simulcast has been released on the bootleg album, "The Monkees Live In Japan 1968" |
| "I Saw Mommy Kissing Santa Claus" -as part of a medley | 1986 | Tommie Connor | Davy Jones | From the MTV music video The Monkees Christmas Medley |
| "I Want You, I Need You, I Love You" -recorded live in Australia for "Sounds of the Monkees" tour with Peter and Davy | 1986 | Maurice Mysels, Ira Kosloff | Peter Tork | -part of a medley -released on bootleg album |
| "I'm in Love with Six Girls" -recorded live in Australia for "Sounds of the Monkees" tour with Peter and Davy | 1986 | David Jones | Davy Jones | released on bootleg album |
| "Jingle Bell Rock" -as part of a medley | 1986 | Joe Beal, Jim Boothe | The Monkees | From the MTV music video The Monkees Christmas Medle |
| "Johnny B. Goode" (Mike's solo spot during the Japanese concert of October 1968 recorded for TV - shown only in Japan) | 1968 | Chuck Berry | Michael Nesmith | The concert audio from the radio simulcast has been released on the bootleg album, "The Monkees Live In Japan 1968" |
| "Little Darlin'": musical number for 33 1/3 Revolutions Per Monkee TV Special | 1968 | Maurice Williams | Davy Jones w/ Peter Tork | part of a medley with other singers ("At the Hop" - The Monkees, "I'm Ready" - Fats Domino, "Whole Lotta Shakin' Goin' On" - Jerry Lee Lewis, "Tutti Frutti" -Little Richard, "Shake a Tail Feather" - We Three & The Monkees, Blue Monday" - Fats Domino, Little Darlin'" - The Monkees, "Long Tall Sally" - Little Richard, "Down the Line" - Down the Line - Jerry Lee Lewis, "Dem Bones" - The Clara Ward Singers) |
| "Lucille" -recorded live in Australia for "Sounds of the Monkees" tour with Peter and Davy | 1986 | Albert Collins, Little Richard | Peter Tork | -part of a medley -released on bootleg album |
| "Solfeggietto": musical number for 33 1/3 Revolutions Per Monkee TV Special | 1968 | C.P.E. Bach | Peter Tork | |
| "String for My Kite": musical number for 33 1/3 Revolutions Per Monkee TV Special | 1968 | Bill Dorsey | Davy Jones | Backing tracks released on Instant Replay (2011 Rhino Handmade deluxe CD reissue) |
| "We Wish You a Merry Christmas" -as part of a medley | 1986 | Arthur Warrel | The Monkees | From the MTV music video The Monkees Christmas Medley |
| "Whole Lotta Shakin Goin On" -recorded live in Australia for "Sounds of the Monkees" tour with Peter and Davy | 1986 | Dave "Curlee" Williams, James Faye "Roy" Hall | Peter Tork | -part of a medley -released on bootleg album |
| "Winter Wonderland" -as part of a medley | 1986 | Felix Bernard, Richard B. Smith | The Monkees | From the MTV music video The Monkees Christmas Medley |

== Other collaborations ==
This section is for songs featuring collaborations with two or more of the band members but not (yet) officially released as Monkees songs. This section only refers to songs released on albums or as singles, not to live performances (unless released on an album).

| Song | Year | Album debut | Songwriter(s) | Lead vocal(s) | Monkees Band Members involved |
|---|---|---|---|---|---|
| "Action" | 1976 | Dolenz, Jones, Boyce & Hart - Concert In Japan | Steve Venet and Tommy Boyce | Keith Allison with Micky Dolenz | Micky & Davy |
| "Along Came Jones" | 1976 | Dolenz, Jones, Boyce & Hart | Leiber Stoller | Micky Dolenz & Bobby Hart with Davy Jones | Micky & Davy |
| "Are You Sleeping?" | 1977 | Harry Nilsson's "The Point" Original Cast Soundtrack | Harry Nilsson | Davy Jones with Micky Dolenz | Davy & Micky |
| "Blanket for a Sail" | 1977 | Harry Nilsson's "The Point" Original Cast Soundtrack | Harry Nilsson | Davy Jones | Davy & Micky |
| "Come a Little Bit Closer" (as part of a medley) | 1976 | Dolenz, Jones, Boyce & Hart - Concert in Japan | Tommy Boyce, Bobby Hart and Wes Farrell | Davy Jones | Micky & Davy |
| "Easy On You" | 1971 | (single release) | Micky Dolenz | Micky Dolenz | Micky & Peter (bass) |
| "Gotta Get Up" | 1977 | Harry Nilsson's "The Point" Original Cast Soundtrack | Harry Nilsson | Davy Jones with Micky Dolenz | Davy & Micky |
| "He's Leaving Here This Morning (bath)" | 1977 | Harry Nilsson's "The Point" Original Cast Soundtrack | Harry Nilsson | Micky Dolenz | Davy & Micky |
| "Hurt So Bad" | 1976 | Dolenz, Jones, Boyce & Hart - Concert in Japan | Teddy Randazzo, Bobby Weinstein and Bobby Hart | Bobby Hart with Davy Jones | Micky & Davy (backing vocals) |
| "I Love You (And I'm Glad That I Said It)" | 1976 | Dolenz, Jones, Boyce & Hart | Tommy Boyce and Bobby Hart | Bobby Hart | Micky & Davy (backing vocals) |
| "I Remember the Feeling" | 1976 | Dolenz, Jones, Boyce & Hart | Tommy Boyce and Bobby Hart | Davy Jones & Micky Dolenz | Micky & Davy |
| "It Always Hurts the Most in the Morning" | 1976 | Dolenz, Jones, Boyce & Hart | Tommy Boyce and Micky Dolenz | Micky Dolenz & Bobby Hart | Micky & Davy |
| "It's a Jungle Out There" | 1977 | Harry Nilsson's "The Point" Original Cast Soundtrack | Harry Nilsson | Micky Dolenz | Davy & Micky |
| "Keep on Singing" (as part of a medley) | 1976 | Dolenz, Jones, Boyce & Hart - Concert in Japan | Danny Janssen and Bobby Hart | Micky Dolenz | Micky & Davy |
| "Life Line" | 1977 | Harry Nilsson's "The Point" Original Cast Soundtrack | Harry Nilsson | Davy Jones | Davy & Micky |
| "Me And My Arrow" | 1977 | Harry Nilsson's "The Point" Original Cast Soundtrack | Harry Nilsson | Davy Jones | Davy & Micky |
| "MG BGT" (studio version) | 1994 | Stranger Things Have Happened | Peter Tork | Peter Tork | Peter & Mike (backing vocals) |
| "Milkshake" | 1994 | Stranger Things Have Happened | Martin Briley | Peter Tork | Peter, Mike & Micky (backing vocals) |
| "Moonfire" | 1976 | Dolenz, Jones, Boyce & Hart | William E. Martin | Micky Dolenz | Micky & Davy |
| "Oh Someone" | 1971 | (single release) | David Price | Micky Dolenz | Micky & Peter (bass) |
| "Peaches 'N' Cream" (as part of a medley) | 1976 | Dolenz, Jones, Boyce & Hart - Concert In Japan | Steve Venet and Tommy Boyce | Micky Dolenz and Davy Jones | Micky & Davy |
| "P.O.V. Waltz" | 1977 | Harry Nilsson's "The Point" Original Cast Soundtrack | Harry Nilsson | Davy Jones | Davy & Micky |
| "Pretty Little Angel Eyes" (as part of a medley) | 1976 | Dolenz, Jones, Boyce & Hart - Concert In Japan | Curtis Lee and Tommy Boyce | Micky Dolenz and Davy Jones | Micky & Davy |
| "Right Now" | 1976 | Dolenz, Jones, Boyce & Hart | Tommy Boyce and Bobby Hart | Davy Jones | Micky & Davy |
| "Sail On Sailor" | 1976 | Dolenz, Jones, Boyce & Hart | Doug Trevor | Davy Jones & Bobby Hart with Micky Dolenz | Micky & Davy |
| "Savin' My Love for You" | 1976 | Dolenz, Jones, Boyce & Hart | Micky Dolenz and Davy Jones | Micky Dolenz | Micky & Davy |
| "Something's Wrong with Me" (as part of a medley) | 1976 | Dolenz, Jones, Boyce & Hart - Concert In Japan | Danny Janssen and Bobby Hart | Bobby Hart | Micky & Davy (backing vocals) |
| "Sweet Heart Attack" | 1976 | Dolenz, Jones, Boyce & Hart | Tommy Boyce and Bobby Hart | Micky Dolenz | Micky & Davy |
| "Teenager in Love" | 1976 | Dolenz, Jones, Boyce & Hart | Doc Pomus and Mort Shuman | Micky Dolenz | Micky & Davy |
| "Think About Your Troubles" | 1977 | Harry Nilsson's "The Point" Original Cast Soundtrack | Harry Nilsson | Davy Jones | Davy & Micky |
| "You and I" | 1976 | Dolenz, Jones, Boyce & Hart | Micky Dolenz and Davy Jones | Micky Dolenz | Micky & Davy |
| "You Didn't Feel That Way Last Night (Don't You Remember)" | 1976 | Dolenz, Jones, Boyce & Hart | Tommy Boyce and Bobby Hart | Micky Dolenz | Micky & Davy |
