= An Evening with The Monkees: The 45th Anniversary Tour =

2011 concert tour by the Monkees

- Tour by the Monkees
- Promotional poster for tour
- Start date: May 12, 2011
- End date: July 23, 2011
- Legs: 2
- No. of shows: 10 in Europe; 36 in North America; 46 Total

the Monkees concert chronology
- Monkeemania (2001–02); 45th Anniversary Tour (2011); An Evening with The Monkees (2012)

An Evening with The Monkees: The 45th Anniversary Tour, also called Here They Come!: 45th Anniversary Tour, was the fourth reunion tour by American pop rock group the Monkees, including Davy Jones, Micky Dolenz, and Peter Tork. Jones died of a heart attack on February 29, 2012. It was the group's first tour in a decade following Monkeemania, which ran from 2001 to 2002. The tour visited the United Kingdom, the United States and Canada. Due to the success of the first North American leg, a second leg was planned for the fall of 2011; however, dates were suddenly cancelled without explanation.

== Background ==
In October 2010, Davy Jones stated the group (minus Michael Nesmith) were reuniting in 2011, hinting at the possibility of the tour. The three members of the group announced the tour on the BBC's The One Show. The group stated the initial run was predominately in the UK, however, they hoped the success of the tour could be expanded to the U.S. The first ten dates of the tour were released on February 21, 2011. Shortly afterwards, dates in the U.S. and Canada were revealed as well. It was later reported that, if successful, the group will earn nearly £1 million each. Jones remarked that the tour was not about money but reconnecting with fans.

The tour came as a surprise to fans, following the backstage drama of the previous reunion tour. Group member Peter Tork stated that he had a meltdown on the last tour, causing tension between the other members of the tour. Tork further commented that he considered quitting towards the end of the tour but eventually chose to stay until the end of the trek.

The tour was described as a "full multimedia experience." With visual design by Rachel Lichtman, it displayed clips from the group's popular TV series, rare and unseen adverts and footage from the cult film, Head. It continues to state the group will play their greatest hits alongside rarities and album cuts from their nearly half-century career. To introduce the tour, group member Micky Dolenz stated:

"We need to share this music once again as people want to hear music from times that made them happy. The records are being played all the time. And, the fans are still there. So, we're going to do it." "I'm looking forward to getting back together with my old buddies for some good ol' rock and roll."

Making the tour unique from previous tours was the performers' choice to depart from simply doing their greatest hits, and choosing instead to include many rare songs. "Saturday's Child", a song from the Monkees' first album that had been featured on the TV show, had never been performed live. Other choices included "I Don't Think You Know Me" and "All of Your Toys", songs that were not released until 1987 on the rarities compilation Missing Links. "Hard to Believe", a song featured on their album Pisces, Aquarius, Capricorn & Jones Ltd. but never used on the TV show, and "Someday Man", a 1969 single that never appeared on an album, were also included.

== Setlist ==
1. "Scenes from The Monkees" (contains elements of "(Theme From) The Monkees") (Video Introduction)
2. "I'm a Believer"
3. "Mary, Mary"
4. "The Girl I Knew Somewhere"
5. "She Hangs Out"
6. "Randy Scouse Git"
7. "Your Auntie Grizelda"
8. "It's Nice to Be with You"
9. "I Don't Think You Know Me"
10. "Look Out (Here Comes Tomorrow)"
11. "Words"
12. "Cuddly Toy"
13. "Papa Gene's Blues"
14. "Listen to the Band"
15. "That Was Then, This Is Now"
16. "All of Your Toys"
17. "Hard to Believe"
18. "What Am I Doing Hangin' 'Round?"
19. "Sometime in the Morning"
20. "Valleri"
21. "Scenes from "Head" (Video Interlude)
22. "No Time"
23. "Circle Sky"
24. "Can You Dig It"
25. "As We Go Along"
26. "Long Title: Do I Have to Do This All Over Again?"
27. "Porpoise Song"
28. "Daddy's Song"
29. "For Pete's Sake"
30. "When Love Comes Knockin' (at Your Door)"
31. "She"
32. "A Little Bit Me, a Little Bit You"
33. "Shades of Gray"
34. "Last Train to Clarksville"
35. "Goin' Down"
36. "I Wanna Be Free"
37. "Saturday's Child"
38. "Someday Man"
39. "(I'm Not Your) Steppin' Stone"
40. "Daydream Believer"

Encore

41. "Peter Percival Patterson's Pet Pig Porky"
42. "Pleasant Valley Sunday"
43. "I'm a Believer" (Reprise)

== Tour dates ==
Date	City	Country	Venue
United Kingdom
May 12, 2011	Liverpool	England	Liverpool Arena
May 14, 2011	Manchester	England	O_{2} Apollo Manchester
May 15, 2011	Newcastle upon Tyne	England	Newcastle City Hall
May 16, 2011	Glasgow	Scotland	SEC Armadillo
May 19, 2011	London	England	Royal Albert Hall
May 20, 2011	Sheffield	England	Irwin Mitchell Oval Hall
May 21, 2011	Birmingham	England	Arena Birmingham
May 23, 2011	Plymouth	England	Plymouth Pavilions
May 24, 2011	Cardiff	Wales	Cardiff International Arena
May 25, 2011	Nottingham	England	Royal Concert Hall
North America
June 3, 2011^{[A]}	Atlanta	United States	Chastain Park Amphitheater
June 4, 2011	Clearwater	United States	Ruth Eckerd Hall
June 5, 2011	Pompano Beach	United States	Pompano Beach Amphitheater
June 6, 2011	Jacksonville	United States	Florida Theatre
June 8, 2011	Glen Allen	United States	Innsbrook Snagajob Pavilion
June 9, 2011	Morristown	United States	Mayo Performing Arts Center
June 10, 2011	Uncasville	United States	Mohegan Sun Arena
June 11, 2011	Niagara Falls	Canada	Avalon Ballroom Theatre
June 12, 2011	Niagara Falls	Canada	Avalon Ballroom Theatre
June 15, 2011	Lowell	United States	Lowell Memorial Auditorium
June 16, 2011	New York City	United States	Beacon Theatre
June 17, 2011	Westbury	United States	NYCB Theatre at Westbury
June 18, 2011	Atlantic City	United States	Borgata Music Box
June 19, 2011	Vienna	United States	Filene Center
June 20, 2011	Hershey	United States	Hershey Theatre
June 22, 2011	Pittsburgh	United States	Stage AE
June 23, 2011	Detroit	United States	Fox Theatre
June 24, 2011	Columbus	United States	Lifestyle Communities Pavilion
June 25, 2011	Cincinnati	United States	Procter & Gamble Hall
June 26, 2011	Indianapolis	United States	Murat Theatre
June 28, 2011	South Bend	United States	Morris Performing Arts Center
June 29, 2011	Waukegan	United States	Genesee Theatre
June 30, 2011	Merrillville	United States	Star Plaza Theatre
July 1, 2011^{[B]}	Apple Valley	United States	Weesner Amphitheater
July 2, 2011^{[B]}	Apple Valley	United States	Weesner Amphitheater
July 3, 2011^{[C]}	Council Bluffs	United States	Stir Concert Cove
July 5, 2011	Denver	United States	Paramount Theatre
July 8, 2011	Tacoma	United States	Pantages Theater
July 9, 2011	Ridgefield	United States	Sleep Country Amphitheater
July 10, 2011	Saratoga	United States	Mountain Winery Amphitheater
July 13, 2011	Bakersfield	United States	Fox Theater
July 14, 2011	Santa Ynez	United States	Samala Showroom
July 15, 2011	Cabazon	United States	Morongo Events Center
July 16, 2011	Los Angeles	United States	Greek Theatre
July 21, 2011^{[D]}	New York City (Free concert)	United States	Coney Island
July 23, 2011^{[E]}	Milwaukee	United States	Marcus Amphitheater

Festivals and other miscellaneous performances
^{A} This concert was a part of the "Delta Classic Chastain Summer Concert Series
^{B} These concerts were a part of "Music in the Zoo"
^{C} This concert was a part of the "Stir Cove Concert Series"
^{D} This concert was a part of the "Seaside Summer Concert Series"
^{E} This concert was part of "Festa Italiana"

Cancellations and rescheduled shows

August 26, 2011	Westbury, New York	NYCB Theater at Westbury	Cancelled
August 27, 2011	Hyannis, Massachusetts	Cape Cod Melody Tent	Cancelled
August 28, 2011	Hampton Beach, New Hampshire	Hampton Beach Casino Ballroom	Cancelled
August 31, 2011	Upper Darby Township, Pennsylvania	Tower Theater	Cancelled
September 1, 2011	Durham, North Carolina	Durham Performing Arts Center	Cancelled
September 2, 2011	Huntington, West Virginia	Big Sandy Superstore Arena	Cancelled
September 4, 2011	Cleveland, Ohio	Jacobs Pavilion at Nautica	Cancelled
September 7, 2011	Englewood, New Jersey	Bergen Performing Arts Center	Cancelled
September 8, 2011	New Brunswick, New Jersey	State Theatre	Cancelled
September 9, 2011	Albany, New York	Times Union Center	Cancelled
September 10, 2011	Bushkill, Pennsylvania	Pocono Mountains Performing Arts Center	Cancelled
September 12, 2011	Saint Charles, Missouri	Family Arena	Cancelled
September 23, 2011	Coquitlam, Canada	Red Robinson Show Theatre	Cancelled

=== Box office score data ===
Venue	City	Tickets sold / available	Gross revenue
Ruth Eckerd Hall	Clearwater	2,094/ 2,094 (100%)	$114,688
Mohegan Sun Arena	Uncasville	3,212 / 4,172 (77%)	$96,360
Beacon Theatre	New York City	2,745 / 2,745 (100%)	$194,275
Hershey Theatre	Hershey	1,944 / 1,944 (100%)	$123,960
Lifestyle Communities Pavilion	Columbus	1,540 / 3,500 (44%)	$66,348
Morris Performing Arts Center	South Bend	1,924 / 2,564 (75%)	$110,488
Stir Concert Cove	Council Bluffs	2,913 / 3,500 (83%)	$111,410
Greek Theatre	Los Angeles	5,076 / 5,826 (87%)	$228,983
TOTAL		21,448 / 26,345 (81%)	$1,046,492

== Critical reception ==
Shows on the European leg of the tour received high praise from most music critics. Jade Wright (Liverpool Echo) gave the performance at the Echo Arena Liverpool an eight out of ten. She wrote: "Showing a refreshing lack of vanity, they chose to perform against a screen showing clips from their TV show— they may be older now but the energy and enthusiasm they put into the show meant the comparison was not an unkind one".

The concert at the historic Royal Albert Hall in London received four out of five stars. Caroline Sullivan (The Guardian) felt the trio indulged the crowd with a throwback to the 60s. She writes, "With the Albert Hall full to capacity with old fans (and one or two young ones, possibly lured by their anomalous 1968 psychedelic movie Head), the Monkees are free to indulge themselves. They play 40 songs, including vaudeville numbers that involve zany voices and walks".

Further praise came from Simon Price (The Independent). He thought the concert at the Royal Concert Hall was a "crowd-pleasing performance". He explains, "Almost apologetically, they run through the reassuring hits to happy-clappy acclaim. As Jones, Dolenz and Tork lap up the applause, most of the hall is relieved they finally played "Daydream Believer". Me, I'm thinking I need to buy Head immediately. Either way, everyone's happy. And yes, they do walk the walk. As, in many senses, they always did".
