= Stranger Things Have Happened (Peter Tork album) =

Studio album by Peter Tork
- Released: 1994; October 10, 2020 (reissue)
- Recorded: January 1993; August 1994
- Studio: Beachwood Recording Studio, Woodland Hills, California
- Genre: Pop rock; Folk rock
- Length: 35:23 (original release); 62:44 (2020 reissue)
- Label: Beachwood Recordings (original release); 7a Records (2020 reissue)
- Producer: Peter Tork; James Lee Stanley

Peter Tork chronology
Stranger Things Have Happened (1994)	Two Man Band (1996)

Alternate cover
- 7a Records 2020 reissue cover art

Stranger Things Have Happened is a 1994 album by former Monkees member Peter Tork. Although he had been performing since the 1960s, this was his first and only solo release.

The album includes several original compositions, and covered a range of styles from folk ("Giant Step") to hard rock ("Miracle") to pop ("MGB-GT").

== Reception ==
Professional ratings
Review scores
Source	Rating
AllMusic	3/5 stars

Bruce Eder of AllMusic wrote "No one's going to believe it, but this is a good album, from Peter Tork no less. Most of the songs are sung with passion and the voice is much better than it was on, say, 'Shades of Gray' 28 years earlier. What's more, Tork reveals himself as a solid rocker, starting from a folk idiom but working with lots of wattage on the instruments and no trace of wimpy singer/songwriter affectation in the playing." He singles out the track, "'Higher and Higher', a folk/gospel song on which Tork mostly plays acoustic banjo, and which is so beguiling that one wishes he'd do an entire album in that idiom, style, and sound."

== Reissue ==
In December 2020, British label 7a Records reissued Stranger Things Have Happened on CD and vinyl with new artwork and nine bonus tracks.

== Track listing ==
=== Original 1994 release ===
All tracks are written by Peter Tork, except where noted.

No.	Title	Writer(s)	Notes	Length
1.	"Stranger Things Have Happened"	Michael Levine; Michael Rudetsky		3:14
2.	"Get What You Pay For"			2:50
3.	"Sea Change"			4:02
4.	"Giant Step"	Gerry Goffin; Carole King	original version released on The Monkees' eponymous 1966 debut album	2:16
5.	"Milkshake"	Martin Briley		3:07
6.	"MGB-GT"			2:44
7.	"Miracle"			2:30
8.	"Pirates"	Nick Thorkelson		3:50
9.	"Gettin' In"		original version appeared on The Monkees' album, Pool It! (1987)	3:35
10.	"Tender Is"			3:20
11.	"Higher and Higher"	Gary Jackson; Raynard Miner; Carl Smith		3:51
Total length:				35:23

=== 2020 reissue ===
Bonus tracks
No.	Title	Writer(s)	Notes	Length
12.	"Milkshake" (Peter Tork and James Lee Stanley)	Martin Briley	originally released on Two Man Band (1996)	2:48
13.	"MGB-GT" (Peter Tork and James Lee Stanley)		originally released on Two Man Band (1996)	2:56
14.	"Miracle" (Peter Tork and James Lee Stanley)		originally released on Two Man Band (1996)	2:42
15.	"Pirates" (Peter Tork and James Lee Stanley)	Nick Thorkelson	originally released on Two Man Band (1996)	4:32
16.	"Get What You Pay For" (live)		originally released on Live/Backstage at the Coffee Gallery (2006)	1:46
17.	"Easy Rockin'" (demo)	James Lee Stanley	recorded September 2010	4:02
18.	"I Truly Understand"	Traditional; arr. Peter Tork	recorded for Fast Folk Musical Magazine (The CooP), June 1982	1:51
19.	"(I'm Not Your) Steppin' Stone" (Peter Tork and the New Monks)	Tommy Boyce; Bobby Hart	A-side of single, released 1981	3:03
20.	"Higher and Higher" (Peter Tork and the New Monks)	Gary Jackson; Raynard Miner; Carl Smith	B-side of single, released 1981	3:41
Total length:				62:44

Tracks 15–17 not included on 2020 vinyl reissue.

== Personnel ==
Credits adapted from 1994 release.

- Peter Tork – vocals, guitar, banjo, producer, liner notes
- James Lee Stanley – acoustic guitar, backing vocals, producer, engineering, programming
- Tommy Mars – keyboards
- Pat Holloway – bass
- Darren Elpant – drums
- Michael Nesmith – backing vocals ("Milkshake", "MGB-GT")
- Micky Dolenz – backing vocals ("Milkshake")
- Timothy B. Schmit – backing vocals ("Stranger Things Have Happened")
- Mel Vasquez – backing vocals ("Sea Change")
- Mackenzie Phillips – backing vocals ("Giant Step")
- Owen Elliott – backing vocals ("Giant Step")
- Anita Sherman – backing vocals ("Gettin' In", "Higher and Higher")
- Deborah Van Valkenburgh – backing vocals ("Tender Is")
- Marc McClure – lead guitar ("Get What You Pay For")
- Laurence Juber – electric guitar ("Milkshake")

Additional

- Nick Thorkelson – artwork
- Joseph L. Steiner, III – mastering
