= Innsbrook, Virginia =

- Census-designated place
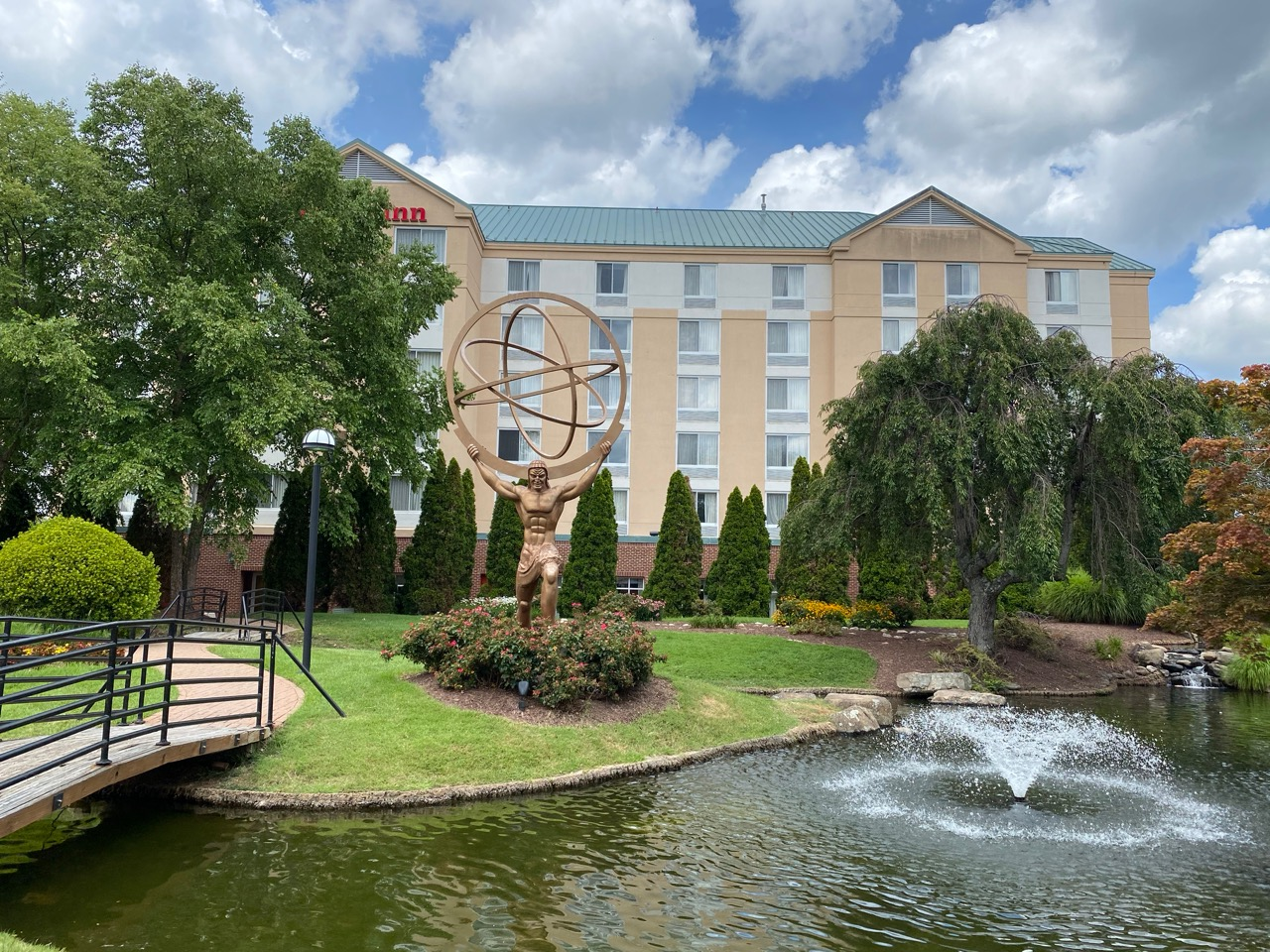
- Atlas statue and water feature, courtyard of the Innsbrook Shoppes.

- Location within Virginia Location within the United States
- Coordinates: 37°38′51″N 77°35′11″W
- Country: United States
- State: Virginia
- County: Henrico

Area
  - Total: 4.4 sq mi (11.5 km^{2})
  - Land: 4.4 sq mi (11.3 km^{2})
  - Water: 0.077 sq mi (0.2 km^{2})

Population (2010)
  - Total: 7,753
  - Density: 1,780/sq mi (686/km^{2})
- Time zone: UTC−5 (Eastern (EST))
  - Summer (DST): UTC−4 (EDT)
- ZIP codes: 23060
- FIPS code: 51-39920
- GNIS feature ID: 2612516
- Website: Official website

Innsbrook is a census-designated place in Henrico County, Virginia, United States. As of the 2020 census, Innsbrook had a population of 8,998.

Innsbrook is a mixed-use corporate center in Central Virginia that was founded in 1979 by local developer Sidney Gunst on property owned by David Arenstein and Henry Stern. Located approximately 13 miles northwest of Richmond’s central business district at the confluence of I-64 and I-295, the development is the region’s second largest employment center. Currently it encompasses over seven million square feet of office space, representing over 400 companies and 22,000 employees. The development includes approximately 1000 residential units and 100,000 sq ft of retail and 12 hotels.

== Governance ==
The Innsbrook Owners Association (IOA) and its board of directors, is a non-profit corporation that upholds a comprehensive set of restrictive covenants that were established to preserve the quality and character of the development. The IOA actively oversees issues such as security, landscaping, lakes, trails, and stormwater management, and coordinates with the county on roads and utilities. The IOA Architectural Review Committee exercises oversight and approval of design plans prior to submission to the county in accordance with Innsbrook’s design guidelines.

== Development Status ==
Innsbrook, along with the adjacent Deep Run Business Park, is Henrico County’s designated Urban Development Area. “Urban Development Areas (UDAs), or other similarly defined growth areas, are a voluntary designation made by Virginia localities with comprehensive plan and zoning authority per the Code of Virginia § 15.2-2223.1.”

== Performance Venue ==
The Innsbrook Pavilion is an 8500 capacity outdoor performance venue that has hosted summer concerts from 1985 until October 2021 and again in 2026. The venue hosts numerous nationally known performers and bands.

== Disambiguation ==
Prior to the development of Innsbrook in 1979, the rural crossroads of West Broad Street (Highway 250) and Cox Road was a Populated Place (unincorporated area) historically known as Erin Shades (GNIS FID: 1760166) within the 23060 zip code. While Erin Shades no longer exists, numerous geographical information systems (GIS) retain this crossroad reference, including the 1997 USGS map.

== Demographics ==
Historical population
Census	Pop.	Note	%±
2010	7,753		—
2020	8,998		16.1%
U.S. Decennial Census; 2000 2010

Innsbrook was first listed as a census designated place in the 2010 U.S. census.

=== Racial and ethnic composition ===
Innsbrook CDP, Virginia – Racial and ethnic composition Note: the US Census treats Hispanic/Latino as an ethnic category. This table excludes Latinos from the racial categories and assigns them to a separate category. Hispanics/Latinos may be of any race.
Race / Ethnicity (NH = Non-Hispanic)	Pop 2010	Pop 2020	% 2010	% 2020
White alone (NH)	4,687	4,405	60.45%	48.96%
Black or African American alone (NH)	848	1,041	10.94%	11.57%
Native American or Alaska Native alone (NH)	21	21	0.27%	0.23%
Asian alone (NH)	1,711	2,573	22.07%	28.60%
Native Hawaiian or Pacific Islander alone (NH)	2	5	0.03%	0.06%
Other race alone (NH)	6	42	0.08%	0.47%
Mixed race or Multiracial (NH)	180	425	2.32%	4.72%
Hispanic or Latino (any race)	298	486	3.84%	5.40%
Total	7,753	8,998	100.00%	100.00%

== History of Corporate Presence ==
- Electronic Data Systems (EDS) plans center at Innsbrook (1989)
- The Computer Co. relocated headquarters to Innsbrook (1989)
- US Sprint puts 500-employee service center in Innsbrook (1989)
- Two firms, MassMutual and Rowe Development Co., move offices to Innsbrook, expand (1989)
- Development companies buy 50 acre technology park property at Innsbrook (1989)
- Aetna Life and Causality Co. relocates divisions to Innsbrook (1989)
