= Two Man Band =

Studio album by Peter Tork and James Lee Stanley
- Released: December 17, 1996
- Recorded: June–August 1996
- Studio: Beachwood Recording Studio, Woodland Hills, California; County Club Studio, Franklin, Tennessee
- Genre: Folk rock
- Length: 37:08
- Label: Beachwood Recordings
- Producer: Peter Tork; James Lee Stanley

Peter Tork chronology
| Stranger Things Have Happened (1994) | Two Man Band (1996) | Once Again (2001) |

Two Man Band is a collaboration between guitarists Peter Tork and James Lee Stanley released in 1996 by Beachwood Recordings. It was Tork's second studio album without The Monkees and the first of three collaborations with Stanley.

== Reception ==
Professional ratings
Review scores
| Source | Rating |
|---|---|
| AllMusic | 4/5 stars |

Aaron Badgley of AllMusic wrote "Both artists compliment each other and the music is very accessible. Tork has a wonderfully pleasing and distinctive voice, and Stanley's voice is a perfect blend." In particular, Badgley calls the recording of The Monkees' "Pleasant Valley Sunday" "outstanding", adding "one wonders what direction the Monkees would have taken had Tork had more control."

== Track listing ==
| No. | Title | Writer(s) | Lead vocal | Length |
|---|---|---|---|---|
| 1. | "Touch Like Magic" | James Lee Stanley | James Lee Stanley | 3:14 |
| 2. | "Pirates" | Nick Thorkelson | Peter Tork | 4:32 |
| 3. | "Everyday" | James Lee Stanley; Rick Ruskin | James Lee Stanley | 3:57 |
| 4. | "MGB-GT" | Peter Tork | Peter Tork | 2:56 |
| 5. | "Everybody Knows" | James Lee Stanley | James Lee Stanley | 4:40 |
| 6. | "Milkshake" | Martin Briley | Peter Tork | 2:48 |
| 7. | "Two Wrongs" | James Lee Stanley; Chris Fradkin | James Lee Stanley | 3:43 |
| 8. | "Miracle" | Peter Tork | Peter Tork | 2:41 |
| 9. | "All I Ever Wanted" | James Lee Stanley; James House | James Lee Stanley | 4:35 |
| 10. | "Pleasant Valley Sunday" | Gerry Goffin; Carole King | Peter Tork; James Lee Stanley | 4:07 |
| Total length: | | | | 37:08 |

== Personnel ==
- Peter Tork – vocals, acoustic guitar, banjo, producer
- James Lee Stanley – vocals, acoustic guitar, producer
