= Pamala Stanley =

American disco and Hi-NRG singer (born 1952)

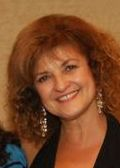
- Pamala Stanley, is an American solo singer.

Background information
- Born: July 16, 1952 (age 74); Philadelphia, Pennsylvania, United States
- Genres: Post-disco, Hi-NRG
- Occupation: singer
- Years active: 1979–present
- Labels: EMI-America, TSR, Atlantic-Mirage, Beachwood
- Website: www.pamalastanley.com

Pamala Stanley (born July 16, 1952) is an American disco and Hi-NRG singer from Philadelphia, Pennsylvania, United States. She scored several dance/club hits from the late 1970s to the late 1980s. She is the sister of folk-pop recording artist and singer-songwriter James Lee Stanley.

== Career ==
Stanley found success mainly in the club/dance markets thanks to five Billboard Club Play chart hits.

She first gained attention with her 1979 debut album, This Is Hot. The album was originally released in Germany on EMI Electrola (with a drastically different cover). After scoring sizable chartings throughout Europe it was licensed to EMI America. The album, with new cover photography, was remixed by producer Rick Gianatos and This Is Hot shot up to #16 on the Billboard Dance charts. She toured extensively throughout the US, Canada, Mexico and South America.

In 1983, she released her second hit "I Don't Want To Talk About It", written by her brother James Lee Stanley. The 12" single was produced by Stanley and then husband Frank Mandaro for their own Komander label. It charted for fifteen weeks eventually climbing to No. 13 on the Billboard Dance charts. After her 1983 success Stanley landed a contract with TSR Records. This led to her 1984 Hi-NRG hit, "Coming Out Of Hiding", also co-written by her brother James Lee Stanley. The 12" single was again produced by Stanley and Mandaro and after fourteen weeks on the charts it peaked at #-4 on the Billboard Dance Charts. Through a licensing move TSR Records owner Tom Hayden sold the song to Mirage Records who re-released the 12" single as well as a 7" version for radio.

Now on Mirage Records, Stanley's next release was the 1985 hit "If Looks Could Kill" (later covered by Heart), and used in the Arnold Schwarzenegger film Raw Deal. Once again she hit the Club Play charts peaking at #-23. Her next and last charting 12" single was with Paul Parker. The double A-side duets of "Stranger (In A Strange Land)" and "Running in Circles". The TSR Records release peaked at #-40 on the Club Play charts in early 1986.

In 1989 Stanley resurfaced on Beachwood Records. She released three 12" singles for the small independent label. "Rhiannon" (a cover of the Stevie Nicks/Fleetwood Mac hit), "Body Time" and a remake of "Coming Out Of Hiding". In 1990 the label released Coming Out Of Hiding...the sequel, a compilation of her greatest hits and new recordings. The remainder of the 1990s Stanley spent working with her band and exploring different genres of music outside the dance market.

In 1997 Live And Cookin (as The Pamala Stanley Band) was released on Shaker Records. The album featured Stanley and the band covering New Orleans Blues and Jazz. It was recorded live in and around Ft. Lauderdale Florida in late 1986.

In 2002, she released It's All In The Game, a collection of Jazz classics from the 1920s, 1930s and 1940s. In 2006, she released a Broadway-themed CD of show tunes entitled This Is The Moment featuring her most requested and favorite songs from Broadway shows. She also did a compilation CD and DVD called Looking Back: The Disco Years 1979–1989, a 15 song greatest hits package. The companion DVD is out of print and a sought after collectible.

In 2007, Stanley released a new album of original material, Seasons of My Heart. The selections range from adult contemporary territory, with a little country and New Orleans jazz influence. One song from this album, (her recording of "Survive") would be chosen as the theme for several Susan G Komen "Race for the Cure" events.

In 2010 I Am There, a collection of inspirational and Christian songs, was released. Many of the songs were written by Stanley and her brother James. The album was recorded by Stanley and several members of her family in honor of her mother, Mary Stanley who died in 2004.

Stanley performed regularly at The Blue Moon in Rehoboth Beach, Delaware as well as several other well known venues around Rehoboth Beach. She currently holds residency at Diego's Nightclub. In 2021, she launched a multi-camera live stream show available through her Facebook and YouTube channels, airing every Wednesday.

Stanley still tours regularly with many projects in the works, as stated on her official website, and Facebook page. She tours extensively on various cruise ships, most notably, Atlantis Events.

== Discography ==
=== Albums ===
- This is Hot (1979)
- Coming Out of Hiding: The Sequel (1990)
- It's All In The Game (2002)
- This Is The Moment (2006)
- Looking Back: The Disco Years 1979–1989 (2006)
- Seasons of My Heart (2007)
- I Am There (2010) (compilation CD with sisters, brother and niece) (Stanley, Rogers & Young)
- Straight From The Heart – The Musical with James Lee Stanley and Chris Bennett (2015)

=== Singles ===
- "This Is Hot" (#16 Billboard Hot Dance Club Play, 1979 / #108 Billboard Bubbling Under the Hot 100)
- "I Don't Want to Talk About It" (#13 Billboard Hot Dance Club Play, 1983)
- "Coming Out of Hiding" (#4 Billboard Hot Dance Club Play, 1984 / #106 Billboard Bubbling Under the Hot 100)
- "If Looks Could Kill" (#23 Billboard Hot Dance Club Play, 1985)
- "Stranger (In a Strange Land)" / "Running Around in Circles" – Pamala Stanley and Paul Parker (#40 Billboard Hot Dance Club Play, 1986)
- "Rhiannon" (1988)
- "Body Time" (1989)
- "Coming Out of Hiding" (1990)
- "I Don't Want to Talk About It" (Almighty Mixes)
- "Coming Out of Hiding" (Almighty Mixes)
- "If Looks Could Kill" (Almighty Mixes)
- "The Bank of Love"
- "Lost in a Dream"
