= Once Again (Peter Tork and James Lee Stanley album) =

Studio album by Peter Tork and James Lee Stanley
- Released: March 6, 2001
- Recorded: September–December 2000
- Studio: Beachwood Recording Studio, Woodland Hills, California
- Genre: Folk rock
- Length: 39:29
- Label: Beachwood Recordings
- Producer: Peter Tork; James Lee Stanley

Peter Tork chronology
Two Man Band (1996)	Once Again (2001)	Saved by the Blues (2003)

Once Again is a collaboration between guitarists Peter Tork and James Lee Stanley released in 2001 by Beachwood Recordings. It was Tork's third studio album without The Monkees and the second of three collaborations with Stanley.

== Reception ==
Professional ratings
Review scores
Source	Rating
AllMusic	2.5/5 stars

Aaron Badgley of AllMusic wrote that Once Again is an "excellent follow-up," calling the song arrangements "simple yet beautiful".

== Track listing ==
No.	Title	Writer(s)	Lead vocal	Length
1.	"Easy Rider"	Peter Tork	Peter Tork	3:35
2.	"Bulldozer"	James Lee Stanley	James Lee Stanley	3:01
3.	"Another Side to This Life"	Fred Neil	Tork	3:20
4.	"Dirty Job"	Stanley; Tom Campbell	Stanley	4:10
5.	"Little Girl"	Tork	Tork	2:31
6.	"One Trick Pony"	Paul Simon	Tork	3:29
7.	"Some Say"	Stanley	Stanley	4:43
8.	"Easy Rockin'"	Stanley	Stanley	4:01
9.	"Hi Babe"	Tork	Tork	2:50
10.	"Stolen Season"	Stanley	Stanley	4:17
11.	"Daydream Believer"	John Stewart	Tork; Stanley	3:32
Total length:				39:29

== Personnel ==
- Peter Tork – vocals, acoustic guitar, electric guitar, banjo, producer
- James Lee Stanley – vocals, acoustic guitar, electric guitar, producer
