= Nick Rocks =

- Also known as: Nick Rocks: Video to Go
- Presented by: Joe Piasek (as Joe from Chicago)
- Theme music composer: Edd Kalehoff
- Country of origin: United States
- No. of seasons: 5
- No. of episodes: 70

Production
- Producer: Andy Bamberger
- Editor: Charles Weissman
- Running time: 30 minutes

Original release
- Network: Nickelodeon
- Release: 1984 – 1989

Nick Rocks: Video to Go, usually shortened to Nick Rocks, is a music video television series that aired on American cable channel Nickelodeon from 1984 to 1989. It features pop and rock music videos over a 30-minute timeframe, presented in a countdown format. The show was typically hosted by "Joe from Chicago" (the on-air name for former New York City disc jockey Joe Piasek). Most episodes feature Joe traveling to various locations to hear viewers request specific music videos. Several guest hosts were featured over the program's run, such as The Monkees and They Might Be Giants.

Music videos played on the show were decided using request letters sent in by viewers. In 1987, five to six thousand requests were received weekly. Many musical guests on Nick Rocks were also seen on Nickelodeon sister channel MTV at the time; according to Nickelodeon president Geraldine Laybourne, MTV executives assisted in finding talent for the program.

== History ==
Nickelodeon executives indicated that the show’s producers would be “meticulous” in the music selected for Nick Rocks amid concerns that the program would air racy videos. In one instance, a young viewer had requested George Michael’s hit song “I Want Your Sex”.

Nick Rocks was initially broadcast three times a week until July 1984, when it became part of Nickelodeon's daily rotation. In 1987, The Monkees became involved in a dispute with their supporters at MTV, causing MTV to pull the group's videos; as a result, The Monkees' videos were transferred to Nick Rocks. The band's "Heart and Soul" music video was voted by Nick Rocks viewers to be their favorite 1987 music video. Despite heavy promotion on Nickelodeon, the founders of the Monkees' label Rhino Records felt that the transition from MTV to Nickelodeon was a reason behind the commercial failure of the Monkees' album Pool It!.

Nickelodeon launched several promotional events in support of Nick Rocks. In 1984, a musical presentation called "Nick Night" was staged at New York's Nassau Coliseum to advertise the series. In 1987, the network held the "Jet for a Day" sweepstakes, with the prize being a role on Nick Rocks and tickets to a The Jets concert. After production on Nick Rocks ended, Nickelodeon incorporated past episodes into a three-hour variety show known as Total Panic. The program aired on Sunday mornings in 1989 and was produced by Andy Bamberger, who also produced Nick Rocks.

== Merchandise ==
Nickelodeon staff distributed Nick Rocks merchandise, including buttons and decals, at the "Nick Night" event in 1984. 1990 issues of Nickelodeon Magazine, sold exclusively at Pizza Hut restaurants, featured pop culture quizzes based on rerunning Nick Rocks episodes. While Nick Rocks was never released on home video while running, clips of an episode of Nick Rocks starring They Might Be Giants is included as a bonus feature on the DVD release of the band's 2003 film, Gigantic: A Tale of Two Johns.

== Nick Jr. Rocks ==
Nick Jr. Rocks title card.

A spin-off geared towards preschool viewers, titled Nick Jr. Rocks, premiered as part of Nickelodeon's Nick Jr. block in October 1991. The series was produced by actress Shelley Duvall and initially ran for five minutes at a time. Differently from its predecessor, Nick Jr. Rocks featured original music videos created specifically for the program. According to a 1991 interview with Duvall, Nickelodeon offered her as much airtime as she wanted for the series; as a result, Nick Jr. Rocks had no permanent position on the network's lineup.
