= Peter Tork =

American musician and actor (1942–2019)

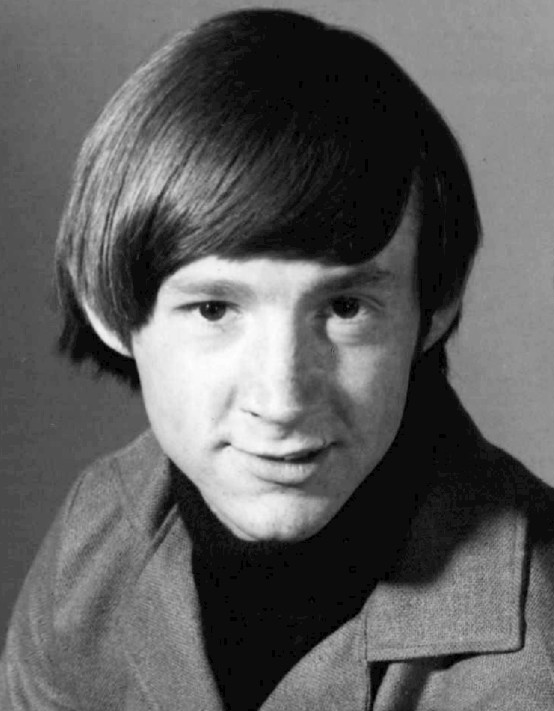
- Tork in 1966
- Born: Peter Halsten Thorkelson; February 13, 1942; Washington, D.C., U.S.
- Died: February 21, 2019 (aged 77); Willimantic, Connecticut, U.S.
- Occupations: Musician; singer; actor
- Years active: 1964–2019
- Spouses: Jody Babb (m. 1964; div. 1964) Reine Stewart (m. 1973; div. 1974) Barbara Iannoli (m. 1975; div. 1987) Pamela Grapes (m. 2013)
- Children: 3
- Musical career
- Genres: Rock; pop; blues; folk
- Instruments: Bass guitar; keyboards; vocals; banjo; guitar
- Labels: Colgems; RCA Victor; Bell; Arista; Rhino; Beachwood Recordings; Sire; 7A Records
- Formerly of: The Monkees; The Peter Tork Project; Shoe Suede Blues

Peter Halsten Thorkelson (February 13, 1942 – February 21, 2019), better known by his stage name Peter Tork, was an American musician and actor. He was best known as the bass guitarist and keyboardist of the Monkees and co-star of the NBC television series of the same name (1966–68).

Tork grew up in Connecticut, and in the mid-1960s as part of the Greenwich Village folk scene in New York City, he befriended musician Stephen Stills. After moving to Los Angeles with Stills, he auditioned for a new musical television sitcom, The Monkees. The series ran from 1966 to 1968 and made Tork and his co-stars teen idols. In addition to albums released with the band, Tork released on Beachwood Recordings one solo album, Stranger Things Have Happened (1994), and later toured with James Lee Stanley, with whom he also recorded three duet albums (Two Man Band, Once Again and Live/Backstage at the Coffee Gallery), as well as his band, Shoe Suede Blues.

== Early life ==
Tork was born at Doctors' Hospital in Washington, D.C., in 1942, though many news articles incorrectly report him as having been born in 1944 in New York City—the date and location listed in early press releases for The Monkees television show. He was the son of Virginia Hope (née Straus) and Halsten John Thorkelson, an economics professor at the University of Connecticut. His paternal grandfather was of Norwegian descent, while his mother was of half German Jewish and half Irish American ancestry.

Tork began studying piano at the age of nine, showing an aptitude for music by learning to play several different instruments, including the banjo, acoustic bass, and guitar. He attended Windham High School in Willimantic, Connecticut, and was a member of the first graduating class at E. O. Smith High School in Storrs, Connecticut. He attended Carleton College before he moved to New York City, where he became part of the folk music scene in Greenwich Village during the first half of the 1960s. While there, he befriended other up-and-coming musicians, such as Stephen Stills.

== The Monkees ==
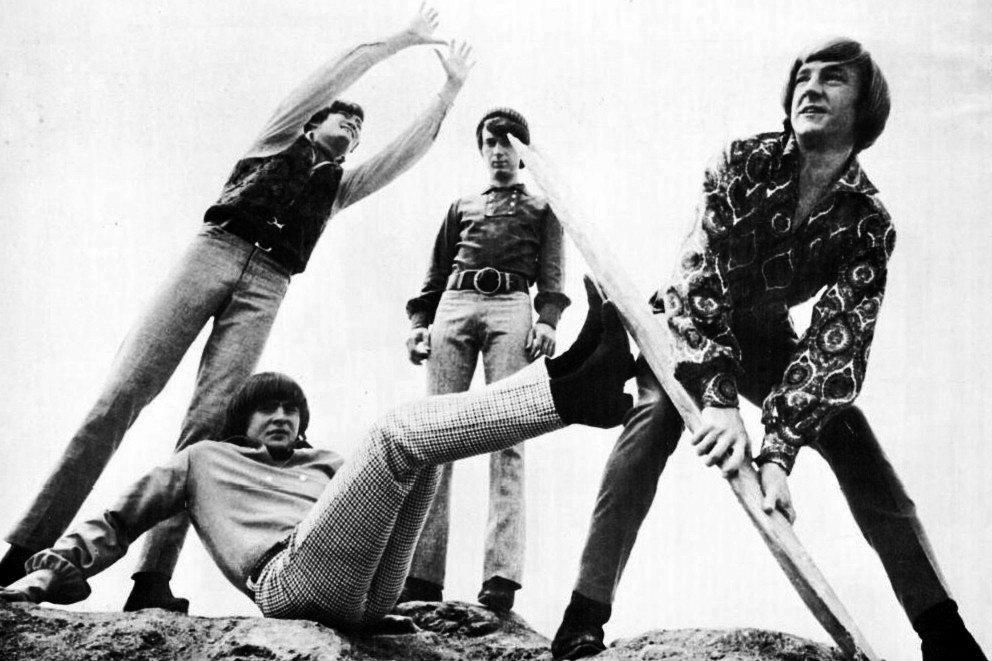
Tork (right) with the Monkees in 1966

In 1965, auditions were held for a new television sitcom called The Monkees, about a fictional pop-rock band called The Monkees. Stephen Stills auditioned but was rejected because the show's producers felt his hair and teeth were not photogenic. When Stills was asked if he knew of someone with a similar "open, Nordic look", Stills recommended Tork. Tork was chosen along with musician Michael Nesmith, actor/musician Micky Dolenz, and Davy Jones (who was already under contract to Screen Gems). Tork was the oldest member of the group.

Tork was a proficient musician before he joined the Monkees. Though other members of the band were not allowed to play their instruments on their first two albums, he played what he described as "third-chair guitar" on Michael Nesmith's song "Papa Gene's Blues" on their first album. He subsequently played keyboard, bass guitar, banjo, harpsichord, and other instruments on the band's recordings. He co-wrote, along with Joey Richards, the closing theme song of the second season of The Monkees, "For Pete's Sake". On the show, he was relegated to acting as the "lovable dummy", a persona he had developed as a folk singer in Greenwich Village.

The DVD release of the first season of the show contains commentary from various band members. In it, Nesmith states that Tork was better at playing guitar than bass. Tork commented that Davy Jones was a good drummer, and had the live performance lineups been based solely on playing ability, it should have been him on guitar, Nesmith on bass, and Jones on drums, with Micky Dolenz taking the fronting role (instead of Nesmith on guitar, Tork on bass, and Dolenz on drums). Jones filled in briefly for Tork on bass when Tork played keyboard.

Recording and producing as a group was Tork's main interest, and he hoped that the four members would continue working together as a band on future recordings. However, the four did not have enough in common regarding their musical interests. In his commentary for the DVD release of the second season of the show, Tork said that Dolenz was "incapable of repeating a triumph". Dolenz felt that once he had accomplished something and became a success at it, there was no artistic sense in repeating a formula.

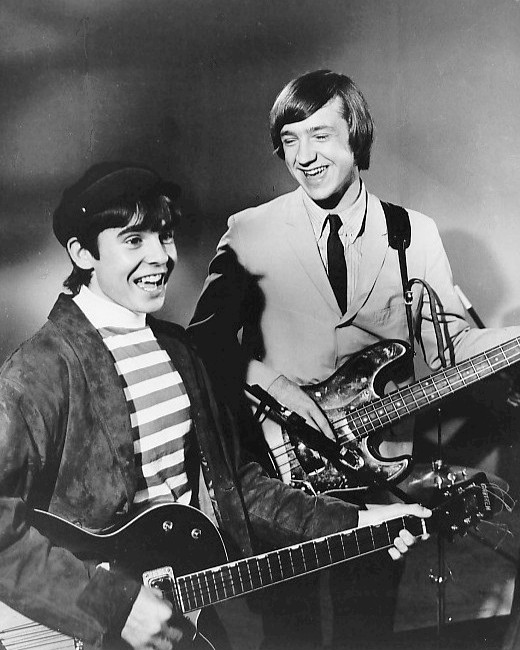
Jones and Tork, 1966

In 1967, free from Don Kirshner's restrictions, Tork contributed instrumental flourishes, such as the piano introduction to "Daydream Believer" and the banjo part on "You Told Me", as well as exploring occasional songwriting with the likes of "For Pete's Sake" and "Lady's Baby".

Tork was close to his maternal grandmother, Catherine McGuire Straus, staying with her sometimes during his Greenwich Village days and after he became a Monkee. "Grams" was one of his most ardent supporters and managed his fan club, often writing personal letters to members and visiting music stores to make sure they carried Monkees records.

Six albums were produced with the original Monkees lineup, four of which reached No. 1 on the Billboard chart. The best selling album was "More of The Monkees", a 1967 release that eventually sold over 5 million copies.This success was supplemented by two years of the television program, a series of successful concert tours across America and abroad, and a trippy psychedelic movie, Head, which is considered by some to have been ahead of its time. However, musical and personal tensions were increasing within the group. The band finished a Far East tour in October 1968 (where Tork's copy of Naked Lunch was confiscated by Australian Customs) and then filmed an NBC television special, 33⅓ Revolutions per Monkee.

No longer getting the group dynamic he wanted, and pleading "exhaustion" from the grueling schedule, Tork bought out the remaining four years of his contract for $160,000, leaving him with little income. In the DVD commentary for the 33⅓ Revolutions per Monkee TV special – originally broadcast April 14, 1969 – Dolenz noted that Nesmith gave Tork a gold watch as a going-away present, with the engraving "From the guys down at work." Jones noted at the time that "Peter's soul left us two and a half years ago. He was a banjo player from Greenwich Village who was made into an actor and finally decided that he didn't want to be a Marx Brother forever. His heart was back in the Village, that's all." Dolenz reflected on Tork's departure, saying, "Three of us more or less play ourselves in the series. The odd one out is Peter Tork. Offstage he's a real serious guy who thinks a lot about things like religion and problems in the world. But in the show, he throws off all that and becomes a dumb-but-likable character who is always doing the wrong thing at the wrong time. He kind of moons around with a lovesick expression on his face — not like the real Peter Tork at all."

== Post-Monkees ==
During a trip to London in December 1967, Tork contributed banjo to George Harrison's soundtrack to the 1968 film Wonderwall. His playing was featured in the movie, but not on the official Wonderwall Music soundtrack album released in November 1968. Tork's brief five-string banjo piece can be heard 16 minutes into the film, as Professor Collins (Jack MacGowran) is caught by his mother while spying on his neighbor Penny Lane (Jane Birkin).

Tork went solo with a group called Peter Tork And/Or Release with then-girlfriend Reine Stewart on drums (she had played drums on part of 33⅓ Revolutions Per Monkee), Riley "Wyldflower" Cummings (formerly of the Gentle Soul) on bass and – sometimes – singer/keyboard player Judy Mayhan. Tork said in April 1969, "We sometimes have four. We're thinking of having a rotating fourth. Right now, the fourth is that girl I'm promoting named Judy Mayhan." "We're like Peter's backup band", added Stewart, "except we happen to be a group instead of a backup band." Release hoped to have a record out immediately, and Tork said that they did record some demos that he may still have stored away somewhere. According to Stewart, the band was supposed to go to Muscle Shoals as the backing band for Mayhan's Atlantic Records solo album Moments (1970), but they were ultimately replaced. They mainly played parties for their "in" friends, and one of their songs was considered for the soundtrack to Easy Rider, but the producers – who had also produced Head – eventually decided not to include it. The Release could not secure a record contract, and by 1970, Tork was once again a solo artist. As he later recalled, "I didn't know how to stick to it. I ran out of money and told the band members, 'I can't support us as a crew anymore, you'll just have to find your own way.'"

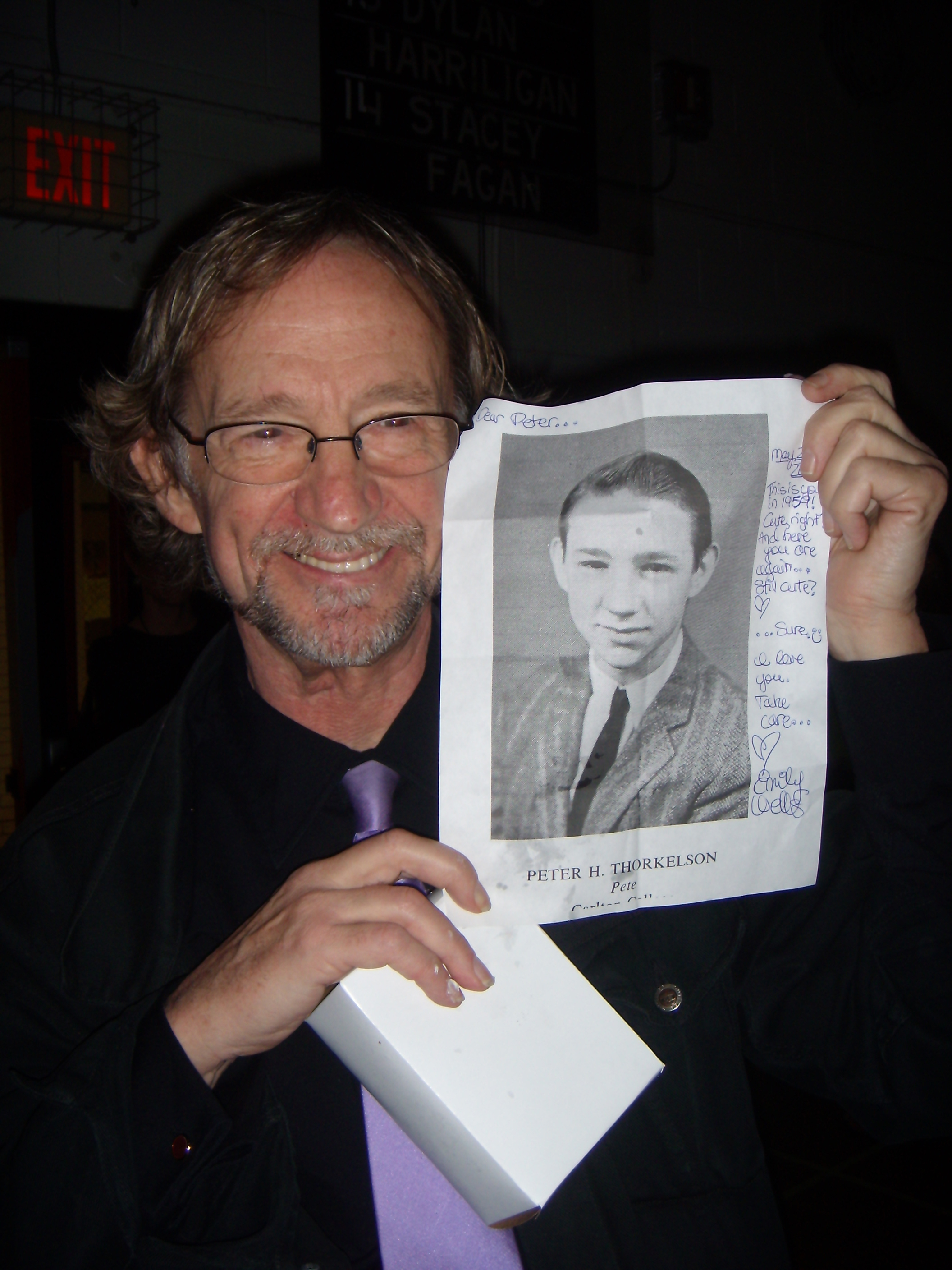
Tork in 2009, holding 1959 yearbook photo.

Tork's record and movie production entity, the Breakthrough Influence Company (BRINCO), also failed to launch, despite such talent as future Little Feat guitarist Lowell George. He sold his house in 1970, and he and a pregnant Reine Stewart moved into the basement of David Crosby's home. Tork was credited with co-arranging a Dolenz solo single on MGM Records in 1971 ("Easy on You" backed with "Oh Someone"). An arrest and conviction for possession of hashish resulted in three months in an Oklahoma penitentiary in 1972. He moved to Fairfax in Marin County, California, in the early 1970s, where he joined the 35-voice Fairfax Street Choir and played guitar for a shuffle blues band called Osceola. Tork returned to southern California in the mid-1970s, where he married, had a son, and took a job teaching at Pacific Hills School in West Hollywood for a year and a half. He spent a total of three years as a teacher of music, social studies, math, French and history, and coached baseball at several schools.

On July 4, 1976, Tork joined Dolenz, Jones, Boyce & Hart onstage at Disneyland for a guest appearance during their concert tour. Later that year, he reunited with Jones and Dolenz in the studio for the recording of the single "Christmas Is My Time of Year" backed with "White Christmas", which saw a limited release for fan club members that holiday season.

Between 1982 and 1985 Micky and Peter came on the Howard Stern afternoon show on WNBC to play Mystery Guest, Peter played Inventions in F Major on a casio keyboard.

Tork returned to the film world in 2017 in the horror movie I Filmed Your Death, written and directed by Sam Bahre.

== Sire Records ==
A chance meeting with Sire Records executive Pat Horgan at the Bottom Line in New York City led to Tork recording a six-song demo, his first recording in many years. Recorded in summer 1980, it featured Tork, who sang and played rhythm guitar, keyboards, and banjo. He was backed by Southern rock band Cottonmouth, led by guitarist/singer/songwriter Johnny Pontiff, featuring Gerard Trahan on guitar, keyboards, and vocals, Gene Pyle on bass guitar and vocals, and Gary Hille on percussion.

With George Dispigno as an engineer, Horgan produced the six tracks, which included two Monkees covers, "Shades of Gray" and "Pleasant Valley Sunday". The four other tracks were "Good Looker", "Since You Went Away" (which appeared on the Monkees' 1987 album Pool It!), "Higher and Higher", and "Hi Hi Babe". Also present at the sessions were Joan Jett, Chrissie Hynde, and Tommy Ramone. The tracks were recorded at Blue Horizon House at 165 West 74th Street, home of Sire Records, but Seymour Stein, president of Sire, rejected the demo, stating "there's nothing there". Tork recorded the second set of demos in New York City, but little is known about these recordings, other than one track was another version of "Pleasant Valley Sunday" featuring an unknown rock band and a violin solo.

During this time, Tork appeared regularly on The Uncle Floyd Show, broadcast on U-68 out of New Jersey. He performed comedy bits and lip-synced the Sire recordings. Floyd claimed Tork was the "first real star" to appear on the show. (Later, Davy Jones, the Ramones, Shrapnel, and others would follow in his footsteps.)

In 1981, Tork released the single "(I'm Not Your) Steppin' Stone" (backed with "Higher and Higher") with the New Monks. He also did some club performances and live television appearances, including taking part in a "Win a Date With Peter Tork" bit on Late Night with David Letterman in July 1982.

== Monkees reunions, other bands, and activities ==
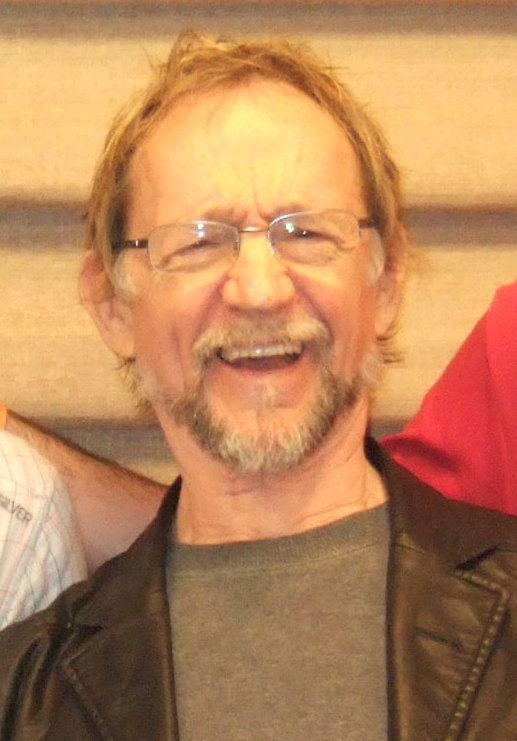
Tork at the Chiller Theatre Expo in 2013

In 1986, after a 1985 tour with Jones in Australia, Tork rejoined fellow Monkees Jones and Dolenz for a highly successful 20th-anniversary reunion tour (Nesmith was not available for a reunion). Tork and Dolenz recorded three new songs for a greatest hits release. The three Monkees recorded Pool It! the following year. A decade later, all four group members recorded Justus, the first studio album with the full group lineup since 1968; it would be another 19 years until that happened again, with the release of Good Times!. The quartet performed live in the United Kingdom in 1997, but for several years following, only the trio of Tork, Dolenz, and Jones toured together. The trio of Monkees parted ways in 2001 following a public feud, then reunited in 2011 for a series of 45th-anniversary concerts in England and the United States.

Since 1986, Tork had intermittently toured with his former bandmates and also played with his bands, the Peter Tork Project and Shoe Suede Blues. In 1991, he formed a band called the Dashboard Saints and played at a pizza restaurant in Guerneville, California. In 1994, he released his first album-length solo project, Stranger Things Have Happened, which featured brief appearances by Dolenz and Nesmith. In 1996, he collaborated on an album called Two Man Band with James Lee Stanley. The duo followed up in 2001 with a second release, Once Again.

In 2001, Tork took time out from touring to appear in a leading role in the short film Mixed Signals, written and directed by John Graziano.

In 2002, Tork resumed working with his band Shoe Suede Blues. The band performed original blues music, Monkees' covers (including blues versions), covers of classic blues hits by greats such as Muddy Waters, and shared the stage with bands such as Captain Zig. The band toured extensively in 2006-2007 following the release of the album Cambria Hotel.

Tork also had a pair of appearances in the role of Topanga Lawrence's father Jedidiah Lawrence on the sitcom Boy Meets World. In his second appearance in 1995, he joined Jones and Dolenz in Season 3, Episode 8 ("Rave On"), although they did not appear as the Monkees. Tork was again cast as Jedidiah Lawrence, while Jones was Reginald Fairfield, and Dolenz's character was Gordy. At the program's climax, the three took the stage together to perform the Buddy Holly song "Not Fade Away" and the Temptations' "My Girl". As an inside joke, actor Dave Madden (best known as band manager Reuben Kincaid on The Partridge Family), cameoed as a manager who appeared, wanting to manage the "new" group, telling them that they "could be bigger than the Beatles." Purportedly, both Nesmith and Pattie Boyd (former wife of Beatle George Harrison) attended the taping.

Tork was also a guest character on 7th Heaven. In 1995, he appeared as himself on the show Wings, bidding against Crystal Bernard's character for the Monkeemobile. In 1999, he appeared as the leader of a wedding band in The King of Queens in Season 1, Episode 13 ("Best Man").

In early 2008, Tork wrote an online advice and info column called "Ask Peter Tork" for the webzine The Daily Panic.

In 2011, he joined Dolenz and Jones for An Evening with The Monkees: The 45th Anniversary Tour in 2011.

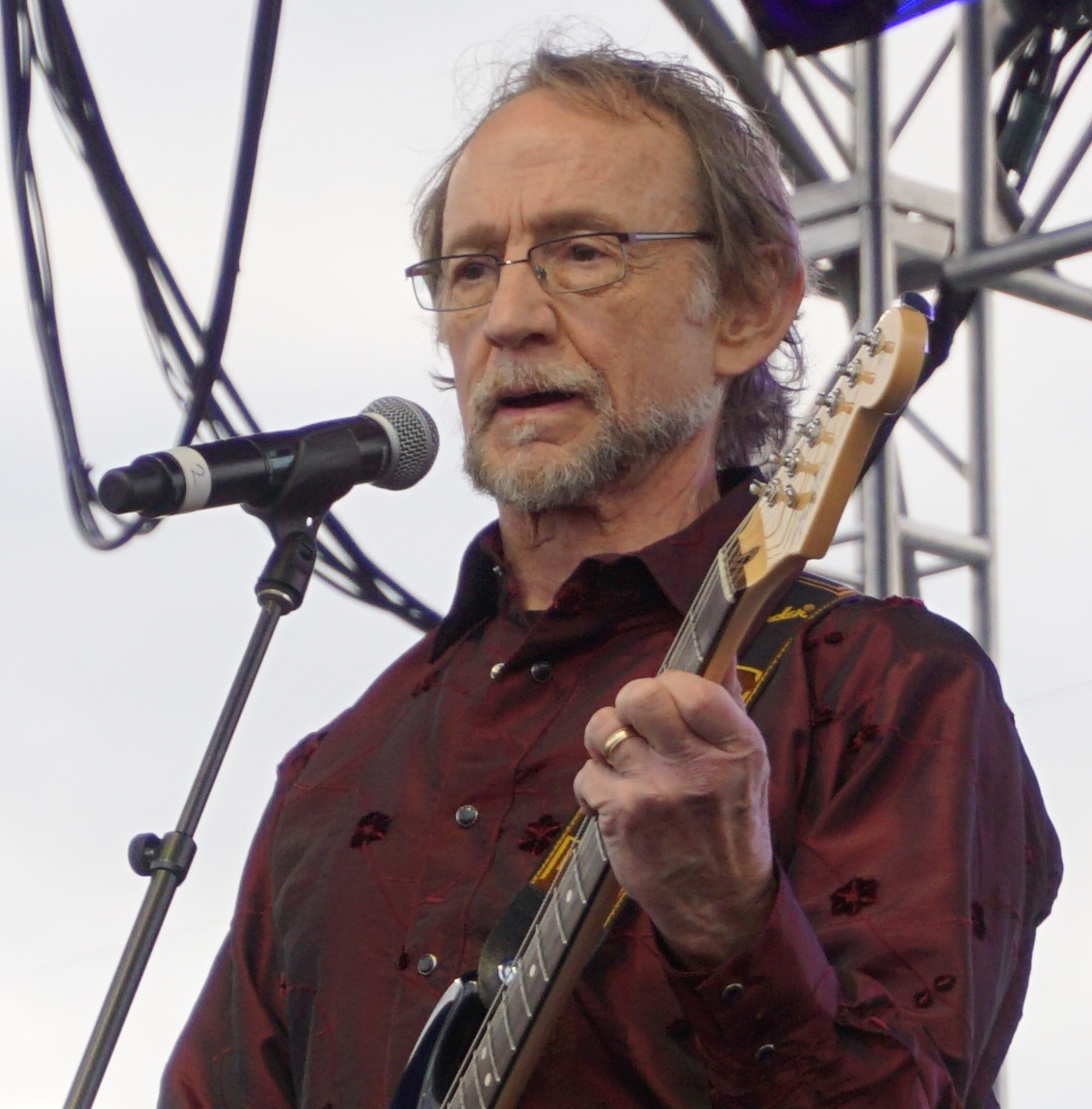
Tork in 2016

In 2012, Tork joined Dolenz and Nesmith on a Monkees tour in honor of the 45th anniversary of their album Headquarters, as well as in tribute to the late Jones. The trio would tour again in 2013 and 2014. In 2016, Tork toured with Dolenz as the Monkees, in what would be his final tour before his death in 2019. Nesmith also played at some of the concerts.

== Personal life ==
In later life, Tork resided in Mansfield, Connecticut. He was married four times, with marriages to Jody Babb, Reine Stewart, and Barbara Iannoli ending in divorce. From 2013 until his death, he was married to Pamela Grapes. He had three children: a daughter, Hallie, with Stewart; a son, Ivan, with Iannoli; and another daughter, Erica, from a previous relationship with Tammy Sestak. As an adult, Tork said he had Asperger syndrome.

=== Illness and death ===
On March 3, 2009, Tork reported on his website that he had been diagnosed with adenoid cystic carcinoma, a rare, slow-growing form of head and neck cancer. A preliminary biopsy showed that cancer had not spread beyond the initial site. "It's a bad news/good news situation", explained Tork. "It's so rare a combination (on the tongue) that there isn't a lot of experience among the medical community about this particular combination. On the other hand, the type of cancer it is, never mind the location, is somewhat well known, and the prognosis, I'm told, is good." Tork underwent radiation therapy to prevent the cancer from returning.

On March 4, 2009, Tork underwent surgery in New York City. On June 11, 2009, a spokesman for Tork reported that his cancer had returned. Tork was reportedly "shaken but not stirred" by the news and said that the doctors had predicted an 80% chance of containing and shrinking the new tumor.

In July 2009, while undergoing radiation therapy, he was interviewed by The Washington Post: "I recovered very quickly after my surgery, and I've been hoping that my better-than-average constitution will keep the worst effects of radiation at bay. My voice and energy still seem to be in decent shape, so maybe I can pull these gigs off after all." He continued to tour and perform while receiving his treatments.

Tork documented his cancer experience on Facebook and encouraged his fans to support research efforts of the Adenoid Cystic Carcinoma Research Foundation. His cancer returned in 2018, and he died at his home in Willimantic, Connecticut, on February 21, 2019.

Nesmith made the following statement,

Peter Tork died this AM. I am told he slipped away peacefully. Yet, as I write this my tears are awash, and my heart is broken. Even though I am clinging to the idea that we all continue, the pain that attends these passings has no cure. It's going to be a rough day. I share with all Monkees fans this change, this 'loss,' even so. PT will be a part of me forever. I have said this before—and now it seems even more apt—the reason we called it a band is because it was where we all went to play. A band no more—and yet the music plays on—an anthem to all who made the Monkees and the TV show our private—dare I say 'secret'—playground. As for Pete, I can only pray his songs reach the heights that can lift us and that our childhood lives forever—that special sparkle that was the Monkees. I will miss him—a brother in arms. Take flight, my Brother.

Nesmith later commented on his strained relationship with Tork. "I never liked Peter, he never liked me. So we had an uneasy truce between the two of us. As clear as I could tell, among his peers he was very well liked. But we rarely had a civil word to say to each other", Nesmith admitted. When he learned of Tork's death, "I broke into tears. What are you going to do?"

Dolenz expressed his grief via Twitter, saying "There are no words right now...heartbroken over the loss of my Monkee brother, Peter Tork."

== Filmography ==
=== Film ===
| Year | Title | Role | Notes |
|---|---|---|---|
| 1968 | Wild in the Streets | Ticket Buyer | (Uncredited) |
| 1968 | Head | Peter | Credited as Peter Tork |
| 1995 | The Brady Bunch Movie | Himself | |
| 1996 | Hide and Seek | Himself | (Uncredited) |
| 1998 | Daydream Believer | Himself | (Uncredited) |
| 2000 | Hendrix | Himself | (Uncredited) |
| 2006 | Cathedral Pines | Mr. Geary | |
| 2006 | The Holy Modal Rounders: Bound to Lose | Himself | Documentary |
| 2007 | The Junior Defenders | Himself | (Uncredited) |
| 2008 | The Wrecking Crew | Himself | Documentary |
| 2013 | Babe's & Rickey's Inn | Himself | Documentary |
| 2017 | I Filmed Your Death | David Lyndale | |

=== Television ===
| Year | Title | Role | Notes |
|---|---|---|---|
| 1966 | American Bandstand | Himself (telephone interview) | 1 episode |
| 1966–1968 | The Monkees | Peter | 58 episodes |
| 1966–1997 | Today | Himself | 4 episodes |
| 1967 | Dream Girl of '67 | Himself | 5 episodes |
| 1967–1968 | Top of the Pops | Himself | 5 episodes |
| 1968 | The Joey Bishop Show | Himself | 1 episode |
| 1969 | 33⅓ Revolutions per Monkee | Himself | (TV Movie) |
| 1969 | Happening '68 | Himself | 3 episodes |
| 1980–1982 | The Uncle Floyd Show | Himself | 6 episodes |
| 1982 | Late Night with David Letterman | Himself | 1 episode |
| 1986–1996 | Good Morning America | Himself | 3 episodes |
| 1986–2000 | Showbiz Today | Himself | 3 episodes |
| 1986–2001 | Entertainment Tonight | Himself | 4 episodes |
| 1987 | The Sally Jessy Raphael Show | Himself | 1 episode |
| 1988 | Midday | Himself | 1 episode |
| 1989 | Aspel & Company | Himself | 1 episode |
| 1989 | Good Morning Britain | Himself | 1 episode |
| 1989 | A.M. Los Angeles | Himself | 1 episode |
| 1989 | The Pat Sajak Show | Himself | 1 episode |
| 1989 | Nashville Now | Himself | 1 episode |
| 1992 | California Dreams | The Surf Guru | Season 1, Episode 10: "Romancing the Tube" |
| 1994 | The Steven Banks Show | Himself | Season 1, Episode 1: "Rock Auction" |
| 1994 | The Geraldo Rivera Show | Himself | 1 episode |
| 1995 | Wings | Himself | Season 7, Episode 6: "She's Gotta Have It" |
| 1995 | Mike and Maty | Himself | 1 episode |
| 1995 | Boy Meets World | Jedediah Lawrence | 2 episodes |
| 1996 | The Tonight Show with Jay Leno | Himself | 1 episode |
| 1997 | Hey, Hey, It's the Monkees | Himself | (TV Special) |
| 1997 | Noel's House Party | Himself | 1 episode |
| 1997 | The Clive James Show | Himself | 1 episode |
| 1997 | Kenny Live | Himself | 1 episode |
| 1997 | Access Hollywood | Himself | 1 episode |
| 1997–2000 | The Big Breakfast | Himself | 2 episodes |
| 1998–2001 | 7th Heaven | Chris | 2 episodes |
| 1999 | The King of Queens | Band Leader | Season 1, Episode 13: "Best Man" |
| 1999 | E! True Hollywood Story | Himself | Season 3, Episode 29: "The Monkees" |
| 2000 | The List | Himself | 1 episode |
| 2000 | Behind the Music | Himself | Season 3, Episode 36: "The Monkees" |
| 2001 | Live! with Kelly | Himself | 1 episode |
| 2001 | Total Access 24/7 | Himself | Season 1, Episode 7: "1007 7th Heaven" |
| 2001 | The Early Show | Himself | 1 episode |
| 2007 | Biography | Himself | Season 21, Episode 30: "The Monkees" |
| 2011–2015 | Loose Women | Himself | 2 episodes |
| 2012 | Inside Edition | Himself | 1 episode |
| 2013 | Welcome to the Basement | Himself | 1 episode |
| 2013 | Good Day L.A. | Himself | 1 episode |
| 2014 | The Sixties | Peter | Season 1, Episode 1: "Television Comes of Age" |

== Song list ==
Songs written or co-written by Tork include the following:

with The Monkees

- "Band 6" (with Micky Dolenz, Davy Jones, Michael Nesmith)
- "For Pete's Sake" (with Joey Richards)
- "Zilch" (with Micky Dolenz, Davy Jones, Michael Nesmith)
- "No Time" (with Micky Dolenz, Davy Jones, Michael Nesmith); credited to Hank Cicalo
- "Peter Percival Patterson's Pet Pig Porky"
- "Goin' Down" (with Micky Dolenz, Davy Jones, Michael Nesmith, Diane Hildebrand)
- "Can You Dig It?"
- "Long Title: Do I Have To Do This All Over Again?"
- "Lady's Baby"
- "Tear the Top Right Off My Head"
- "Gettin' In"
- "Merry Go Round" (with Diane Hildebrand)
- "Run Away From Life"
- "I Believe You"
- "Mister Bob" (Micky Dolenz, Davy Jones, Michael Nesmith, Peter Tork, Eric Van Den Brink), on the album Nick Vernier Band Sessions
- "Little Girl"

with James Lee Stanley

- "Hi Babe"
- "Easy Rider"

with Shoe Suede Blues

- "Ain't Your Fault"

Solo

- "Get What You Pay For"
- "Sea Change (Take Me Down)"
- "Miracle"
- "Tender Is"
- "God Given Grant" (with Tork's brother, Nick Thorkelson)

== Discography ==
Solo:

- Stranger Things Have Happened (1994)
- Peter's Concerto (2015)

With the Monkees:

- The Monkees (1966)
- More of the Monkees (1967)
- Headquarters (1967)
- Pisces, Aquarius, Capricorn & Jones Ltd. (1967)
- The Birds, The Bees & The Monkees (1968)
- Head (1968)
- Pool It! (1987)
- Justus (1996)
- Good Times! (2016)
- Christmas Party (2018)

With James Lee Stanley:

- Two Man Band (1996)
- Once Again (2001)
- Live/Backstage at the Coffee Gallery (2006)

With Shoe Suede Blues:

- Hands Down (2000 fan club only)
- Saved by the Blues (2003)
- Cambria Hotel (2007)
- Step by Step (2013)
- Relax Your Mind: Honoring the Music of Lead Belly (2018)
