= Innsbrook Pavilion =

Coordinates: 37°40′15″N 77°34′31″W

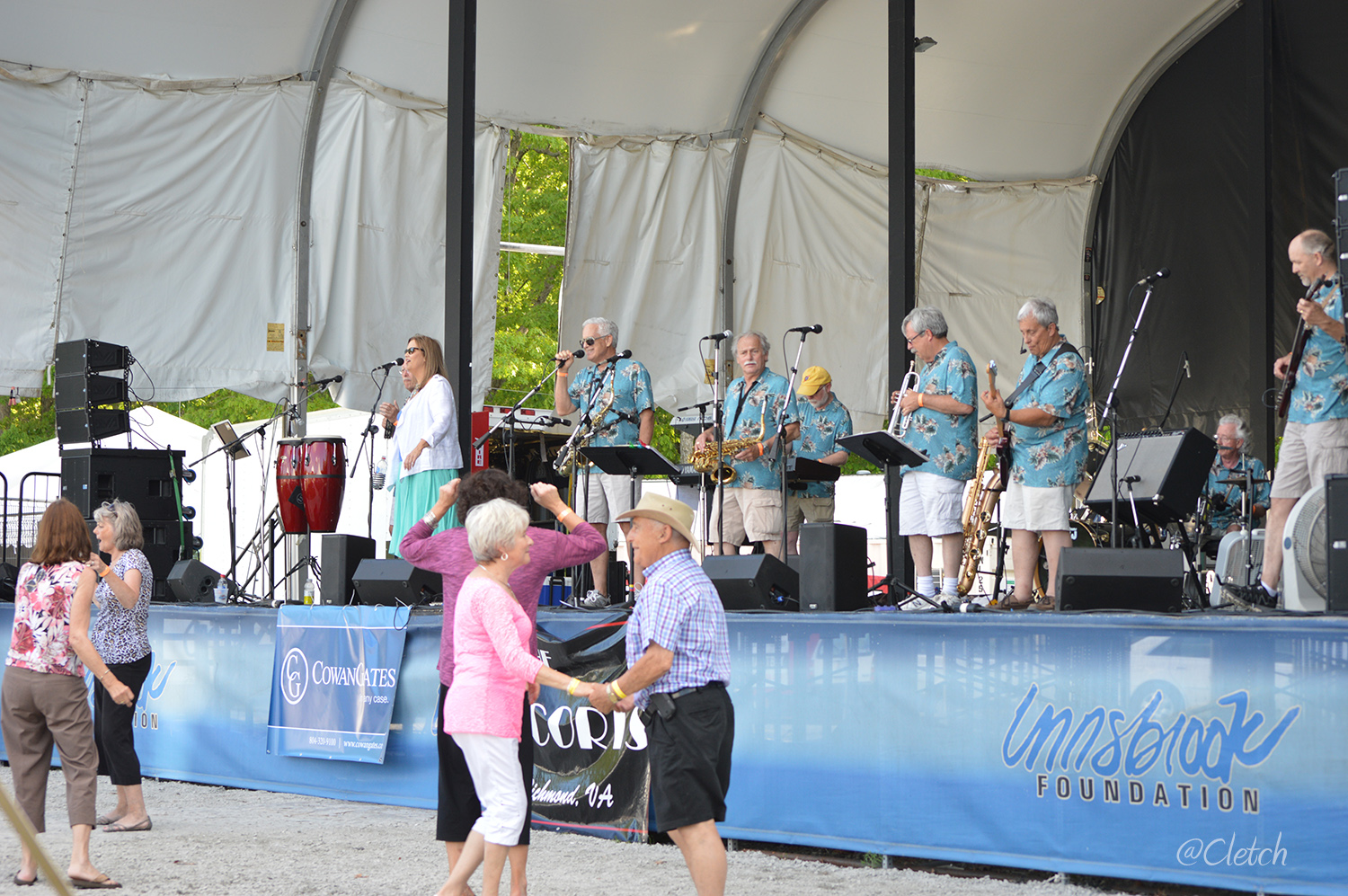
Innsbrook Pavilion during the Central Virginia Wine Festival

Innsbrook Pavilion, known for hosting the Innsbrook After Hours performance series, is a 8,500-capacity outdoor music venue located in Glen Allen, Virginia within the Innsbrook development, a mixed-use corporate center. Its location is at the end of Lake Brooke Drive adjacent to Interstate 295. Well-known acts have performed at the pavilion, such as Hall & Oates, Ted Nugent, Kansas, David Lee Roth, Cheap Trick and Ziggy Marley. It opened in 1985, originally on the east side of Cox Road near Broad Street, but as Innsbrook developed it was first moved behind the Innsbrook Shoppes on the east side of Cox Road at Broad Street and then later to the Lake Brooke Drive location.

In October 2021, the venue closed and Innsbrook After Hours moved their performances to a larger venue at the Meadow Event Park in Doswell, Virginia and was rebranded as the After Hours Concerts Series. In 2025, the venue reopened.
