= Live/Backstage at the Coffee Gallery =

Live album by Peter Tork and James Lee Stanley
- Released: November 7, 2006
- Venue: The Coffee Gallery, Altadena, California
- Genre: Folk rock
- Length: 62:51
- Label: Beachwood Recordings
- Producer: Peter Tork; James Lee Stanley

Peter Tork chronology
Saved by the Blues (2003)	Live/Backstage at the Coffee Gallery (2006)	Cambria Hotel (2006)

Professional ratings
Review scores
Source	Rating
AllMusic	3.5/5 stars

Live/Backstage at the Coffee Gallery (stylized as Live/Backstage @ the Coffee Gallery) is a live performance album collaboration between guitarists Peter Tork and James Lee Stanley released in 2006 by Beachwood Recordings. It was Tork's fifth album without The Monkees and the third and final collaboration with Stanley.

The concert was recorded live at The Coffee Gallery in Altadena, California, during the duo's final tour together.

== Track listing ==
No.	Title	Writer(s)	Length
1.	"Easy Rider"	Peter Tork	3:35
2.	"Intro – James"		0:18
3.	"All I Ever Wanted"	James Lee Stanley; James House	4:52
4.	"Peter and James banter"		0:53
5.	"One Trick Pony"	Paul Simon	3:04
6.	"James Whines and Complains"		0:34
7.	"Daddy's Eyes"	James Lee Stanley	5:16
8.	"James Babbles and Then Introduces Peter"		1:16
9.	"Peter Graciously Enters"		0:22
10.	"Get What You Pay For"	Peter Tork	1:45
11.	"Get Out the Old Banjo – Peter"		0:12
12.	"Swing Banjo"	Pete Seeger	1:03
13.	"Folk Music – Peter"		0:56
14.	"Cuckoo"	Traditional; arr. Peter Tork	3:10
15.	"Peter Hurts Himself for the Crowd"		0:14
16.	"Cripple Creek"	Traditional; arr. Peter Tork	1:20
17.	"Peter and James/Cookie Monster story"		6:24
18.	"Racing the Moon"	James Lee Stanley; Michael Smith	4:39
19.	"There"	Michael Smith	5:33
20.	"Come Home In My Kitchen"	Robert Johnson	3:35
21.	"Peter and James Banter 2: the Crucifix"		2:42
22.	"Hi Babe"	Peter Tork	2:49
23.	"Irony – James"		0:08
24.	"Touch Like Magic"	James Lee Stanley	3:22
25.	"Peter and James Banter 3"		0:16
26.	"Pleasant Valley Sunday"	Gerry Goffin; Carole King	4:17
Total length:			62:51

== Personnel ==
- Peter Tork – vocals, acoustic guitar, electric guitar, banjo
- James Lee Stanley – vocals, acoustic guitar, electric guitar, producer
- Bob Stane – producer
- Dean Acheson – producer
