= Rachel Lichtman =

American visual artist and director

- Born: December 1, 1973 (age 52)
- Occupations: Visual artist, Comedy writer, Filmmaker
- Known for: Creating the independent channel Network 77 and later Programme 4. Directing music videos for various artists.
- Notable work: Network 77, Programme 4, Easy AM 66, Starpop, Musique, Yesterday, Today and TAMAR, Something Cool podcast, Ode to Bobbie Gentry: Celebrating a Living Legend, The Guys Who Wrote 'Em

Rachel Lichtman (born December 1, 1973) is an American visual artist, comedy writer, and filmmaker. Her style is defined by its deeply referenced pop-culture humor and vintage analog design.

Following the initial launch of her independent media channel venture Network 77 in 2017, Lichtman's primary artistic focus transitioned into Programme 4, an extensive, multi-platform multimedia project and live touring presentation. Stylized as an alternate-reality local broadcast television affiliate from the late 1960s and 1970s, the project originates from a fictional small-market media landscape called Golden Sands. The project parodies era-specific commercial branding, broadcast sign-ons, and variety formatting to offer a narrative escape from modern digital consumption. Her work within this universe has been described by critics as "funny as classic SCTV and as retro-accurate as Documentary Now!"

== The "Programme 4" Multimedia Universe ==
=== Narrative Setting & Worldbuilding ===
The narrative framework of the project is anchored entirely by the fictional town of Golden Sands and its regional media entities:

- Fictional Television Programming: The station’s broadcast programming day is established through hyper-detailed opening credit sequence parodies, lost show clips, and commercial interstitials for fictional period programs, including The William Joel Show, A Man Named Brady, and Brooker.
- Easy AM 66: An audio component of the narrative universe, functioning as a complete scripted comedy parody of mid-century "Beautiful Music" and easy-listening AM radio formats.
- Fictional Corporate Sponsors: Broadcast blocks are consistently broken up by satirical regional commercial spots for fictional local businesses, most notably Browner Carpeting and Ramon's Venetian Room.

=== Discography and Studio Cast ===
On December 6, 2024, the project expanded into real-world physical media with the release of the Easy AM 66 Promotional Album Vol. 3 on vinyl and digital formats through New Dimension Records. Written, curated, and produced by Lichtman, the record operates as an immersive radio broadcast block. The limited-edition physical vinyl pressing features album liner notes authored by television writer and creator Jim Gavin (Lodge 49). The studio recording and associated audio media feature collaborative performances from a recurring national ensemble of comedians, actors, and musicians, including Aimee Mann, Ted Leo, Michael McKean, Patton Oswalt, Rich Koz, Tammy Faye Starlite, Dag Juhlin, Michael Penn, Trace Beaulieu, and Frank Conniff.

=== Live Touring Production Formats ===
The project's live touring presentations scale across two distinct formats, ranging from fully staged, large-scale multimedia theatrical revues to screening-style talk show presentations:

- "Browner Presents: Television of Tomorrow" Staged Revues: Presented as high-production, fully scripted corporate "network upfronts" or local sales meetings sponsored by the fictional business "Browner Carpeting," these large-scale presentations featured at major theatrical venues combine a feature-length film projection with live jazz combos, elaborate mid-century staging, and precise ensemble comedy sketches.
  - New York City (Le Poisson Rouge): Featured an ensemble cast including Eszter Balint, Angela DiCarlo, Nath Ann Carrera, Eric Drysdale, Dave Foley, Doug Gillard, Josh Gondelman, Dave Hill, Ted Leo, Chris Murphy, Tammy Faye Starlite, and the David Nagler Sound.
  - Chicago / Midwest (SPACE Evanston): Anchored by Chicago broadcasting icon Rich Koz and musician Dag Juhlin (performing as the host character "Rod Kellog"), alongside Jon Langford, Kelly Hogan, Joel Murray, Nora O'Connor, and Chris Murphy.
- Screening and Live Talk Show Presentations: Serving as a parallel touring format across independent cinemas and smaller performance spaces (such as Vidiots in Los Angeles), these events are framed as classic community screenings of the Programme 4 broadcast day. The screenings are often paired with a dynamic live talk show format featuring Lichtman conducting interviews alongside localized guest hosts, recurring collaborators, and surprise celebrity cameos.
  - Los Angeles (Vidiots): Featured guest spots and cameos from the Sklar Brothers (appearing as West Sands Plaza Cinema employees), Jon Spurney, Dana Gould, Petra Haden, Aimee Mann, Patton Oswalt, and James Urbaniak.
- Interactive Exhibition Roots: Both touring formats evolved out of her early physical media design work, notably the "Television of Tomorrow" interactive gallery installation featured at the Solid Sound Festival, which housed era-accurate living room environments built out with deep-shag carpeting and bean bags.

=== Critical Reception and Analysis ===
The project's dense worldbuilding and stylistic execution have received positive coverage from national entertainment and arts publications:

- The A.V. Club highlighted the project's deep immersion, writing that the production is unified by "Lichtman's impeccable eye for vintage graphic design and some of the deepest-cut pop-culture allusions you're likely to hear," calling the live show "an immersive, at times overwhelming experience."
- Boing Boing characterized the project as a "surreal town stuck in a mid-century far out brown-and-orange aesthetic," drawing comparisons to the classic comedic structures of SCTV and the interlocking parodic worldbuilding of National Lampoon's 1978 Dacron, Ohio newspaper parodies, noting that "the humor is parodic, but also has a touch of affection."
- Aquarium Drunkard praised the real-world impact of the installations and touring revues, analyzing how the project leverages these performance environments to establish a meaningful real-world connection. Critic Nick Calvino noted that "by bringing people into a space dedicated to these comedy stylings and design schemes of a bygone era, it aims to provide for a much more engaging exchange of art that eliminates the screen of a cellphone or computer."

== Filmography, Directing, and Design ==
Lichtman has produced, directed, and edited full-length music programs such as Starpop, Musique, and Ted Leo Presents in a vintage Euro-television style. She has also designed title sequences for The Smothers Brothers and Hanging With Doctor Z.

As a music video director, Lichtman has directed music videos for Ted Leo, Juliana Hatfield, Buffalo Tom, Aimee Mann, Michael Penn, Local H, Laura Jane Grace, Hushdrops, The Haden Triplets, and others. She also directed the unreleased documentary The Guys Who Wrote 'Em, a retrospective into Tommy Boyce & Bobby Hart, creators of the sound of The Monkees.

== Cabaret and Multimedia Projects ==
Lichtman was the co-writer and director of Yesterday, Today and TAMAR, a New York City cabaret show starring Tammy Faye Starlite as fictional Israeli sensation Tamar, a character Lichtman and Starlite developed through invented European television and commercial appearances.

In 2011 and 2012, Lichtman did the visual design work for The Monkees' live concert tours, following her contributions to the liner notes for the group's Head film soundtrack album reissue in 2010.

In 2015, Lichtman and Sarah Thyre created the Something Cool podcast, covering underappreciated female artists and comedians. As an outgrowth of her historical research work on that podcast, she co-produced an archival tribute concert called Ode to Bobbie Gentry: Celebrating a Living Legend in 2018 alongside author Tara Murtha.
