= James Lee Stanley =

American folk singer-songwriter (born 1946)

- James Lee Stanley performing live in 2001

Background information
- Born: April 30, 1946 (age 80); Philadelphia, Pennsylvania, U.S.
- Genres: Folk; folk-rock; jazz; blues; pop/rock
- Occupations: Singer-songwriter; musician; composer; producer; actor
- Instruments: Vocals, guitar
- Labels: Wooden Nickel, Beachwood Recordings
- Website: jamesleestanley.com

James Lee Stanley (born April 30, 1946) is an American folk singer-songwriter. Stanley was also a regular extra on Star Trek: Deep Space Nine for six seasons.

== Biography ==
Stanley was born in Philadelphia, Pennsylvania of Italian, German, Cherokee Indian, Scotch/Irish and English heritage. He said in a 2002 interview that as a child he was "shy, bright, blessed ...[with a] strict father gentle mother ...[and] three beautiful sisters." Stanley's uncle taught him to play the ukulele at an early age, and at sixteen he got his first recording contract and in 1970 did his first Los Angeles recording session through his friend Cass Elliot of The Mamas & the Papas. Stanley and Elliott remained friends until her death. About his early attempts at songwriting, Stanley said "The Producer told me to write songs, so I did. They were terrible."

Stanley spent time in the United States Air Force during the late 1960s as a Chinese linguist and from 1969 to 1972 studied music at Los Angeles City College and Cal State-Northridge. Upon graduation, Stanley began working as a songwriter for producer Bones Howe, a relationship which led Stanley to a recording contract with Wooden Nickel Records, a Chicago label distributed by RCA.

=== Early work ===
Stanley's first self-titled album on Wooden Nickel was released January 23, 1973, and one month later he had his first booking as a recording artist, opening for Les Paul at McCabe's Guitar Shop in Santa Monica. Though Stanley had a ten-album contract, he was unhappy with the promotion offered by the label. "Publicity campaign?", Stanley said. "They made three T-shirts, one for me, one for the president of Wooden Nickel and one for his wife. And there was one group ad with Tower Records L.A. in which my album was included. So far as I know, that was it." Critically, Stanley fared much better. "I received nothing but brilliant reviews. I remember Billboard Magazine, then the biggest music/showbiz mag in the world, choosing only a few albums to spotlight the week I put out Three's the Charm: Queen's Night at the Opera, Loggins and Messina's Sittin In /Ten Years After with Alvin Lee / and Three's the Charm."

After a positive critical reception for Three's the Charm and little support from Wooden Nickel, Stanley asked to be released from his contract which still had seven albums to go. The label agreed. Six years later, Stanley recorded Midnight Radio (1980) for Regency Records. A compilation album of Stanley's earlier recordings titled Eclipse (1982) was released by Jollye Roger. Stanley then recorded Racing the Moon (1984) for Takoma.

=== Beachwood Recordings ===
Following the release of Racing the Moon, Stanley made the decision to start his own label Beachwood Recordings. Stanley said, "I wanted to make a recording of music and comedy and all the labels said: 'Choose one or the other.' So I chose to start my own label and do just what I do.". Stanley currently records for Beachwood, and tours regularly, performing up to three hundred dates each year. He has performed with such diverse acts as Steven Wright, Bonnie Raitt, Robin Williams, Nicolette Larson and Bill Cosby. Since 1990 Stanley has also been working on a musical titled Straight From The Heart, the story of two women and their relationship. In recent years Stanley has collaborated on "two-man band" projects with Peter Tork, Michael Smith, John Batdorf and Cliff Eberhardt, and the upcoming "two-man band" project All Wood and Led with Dan Navarro.

== Discography ==
=== Albums ===
- James Lee Stanley (1973)
- James Lee Stanley, Too (1973)
- Three's the Charm (1974)
- Midnight Radio (1980)
- Eclipse (1982)
- Racing the Moon (1984)
- James Lee Stanley Live (1985)
- Simpatico (1989)
- Ripe Four Distraction (1991)
- The Envoy (1993)
- Even Cowgirls Get the Blues: A Soundtrack Inspired by the Novel (1993)
- Domino Harvest (1997)
- Freelance Human Being (1998)
- Beachwood Christmas CD – 2001 (2001)
- Beachwood Christmas CD – 2002 (2002)
- Traces of the Old Road (2003)
- A Beachwood Christmas – 2003 (2003)
- The Eternal Contradiction (2007)
- New Traces of the Old Road (2008)
- Live in Tehachapi, Vol. 1–2 (2009)
- Backstage at the Resurrection (2011)
- The Apocaloptimist (2014)
- Alive at Last – In Philadelphia (2016)
- Dove – The Soundtrack to the Novel by M.H. Salter (2016)
- Had Enough Yet? Songs of Protest, Resistance and Hope (2017)
- Without Susie (2019)

With Peter Tork:

- Two Man Band (1996)
- Once Again (2001)
- Live/Backstage at the Coffee Gallery (2006)

With Michael Smith:

- Two Man Band Two (2002)

With John Batdorf:

- All Wood and Stones (2005)
- All Wood and Stones II (2013)

With Pamala Stanley and Chris Bennett:

- Straight from the Heart – The Musical (2015)

With Cliff Eberhardt:

- All Wood and Doors (2011)

=== Singles ===
- "Every Minute" / "I Knead You" (1973)
- "Wishing Well" / "This Could Be Goodbye" (1973)
- "Afternoon Rain" / "Lydia" (1974)
- "Plenty of Reason (For Going)" / "Windmill" (1974)
- "Midnight Radio" (1980)
- "Same Olde Samba" / "The Dancer" (1989)
