= Pool It! =

Studio album by the Monkees
- Released: August 1987
- Recorded: May–July 1987
- Studio: Cherokee Studios (Hollywood)
- Genre: Pop rock
- Length: 41:44
- Label: Rhino
- Producer: Roger Béchirian

The Monkees chronology
Missing Links (1987)	Pool It! (1987)	Missing Links Volume Two (1990)

Singles from Pool It!
- 1. "Heart and Soul" / "MGBGT" Released: 1987; 2. "Every Step of the Way" / "(I'll) Love You Forever" Released: 1987

Professional ratings
Review scores
Source	Rating
AllMusic	1.5/5 stars

Pool It! is the tenth studio album by American pop rock band the Monkees, released in August 1987 by Rhino Records. It was the first Monkees studio album of new material since Changes in 1970 and the first Monkees album to feature Peter Tork since the 1968 Head soundtrack.

== Production ==
While Micky Dolenz, Davy Jones and Peter Tork had reunited the previous year for a 20th anniversary tour, with Dolenz and Tork contributing vocals to three tracks for the 1986 compilation album Then & Now... The Best of The Monkees, Pool It! served as the band's first proper "reunion album". Much like the group's early work, the writing of the album was largely handled by outside writers and the instrumentation by session musicians, with the Monkees themselves contributing lead vocals and Tork providing guitar for his own song, "Gettin' In". Michael Nesmith chose not to participate in the album, although he had made a surprise appearance on stage with the band at the Greek Theatre in Los Angeles on September 7, 1986.

== Release ==
The book The Monkees Tale by Eric Lefcowitz claims Pool It! and its two singles were recorded by "Dolenz, Tork & Jones", as opposed to "The Monkees". However, the billing on the LP itself is attributed to "Peter, Micky, Davy — The Monkees". The Monkees, however, have worked largely as a cumulative project since their fourth studio album, under various combinations of the four members.

A deluxe CD/DVD version of the album was released on April 24, 2012, by Friday Music, along with a "180 gram audiophile vinyl" copy of the original album. The CD includes Peter Tork's "MGBGT" (the live B-side to the "Heart and Soul" single) and the remixed single version of "Every Step of the Way" as bonus tracks. The DVD includes the contents of the 1988 video cassette Heart & Soul: The Official Monkee Videography, featuring videos for "Heart and Soul", "Every Step of the Way" and "Don't Bring Me Down", along with interviews and more.

== Promotion ==
Two promotional music videos were produced for Pool It!:

The first video was for "Heart and Soul", filmed in Los Angeles on July 5 and 6, 1987. The video, which stylistically borrows heavily from The Monkees TV series, begins in an ice factory in 1967, with the song "Last Train to Clarksville" playing in the background. Inside the ice factory, Jones, Dolenz and Tork are found frozen in blocks of ice and wearing their outfits from the television show. The video fast-forwards to 1987, where the three Monkees are thawed and learn how much has changed since the late 1960s. They decide to produce a music video in an effort to land a job and, after some comic mishaps, the video producers hand the Monkees what they claim is their video. When their prospective employer sees the video, it turns out to be taped over with a cooking show, which impresses the employer who then hires the band to work in a kitchen. The video for "Heart and Soul" was banned from airplay on MTV, due to a dispute over the Monkees bowing out of an MTV Super Bowl special, although it received rotation on other cable outlets, including Nickelodeon.

The second video was for "Every Step of the Way", filmed in Los Angeles on October 9, 1987. In this video, Jones, Dolenz and Tork are dressed in leather gang outfits and, as the song's lyrics suggest, "hang out in [an] alley way", as an unspecified woman, the apparent object of Jones' affections, wanders in and out of the alley. Meanwhile, Dolenz mimes a performance on drums with trash cans, Tork mimes guitar with a broom and Jones sings into a carrot and later mimes a saxophone solo into a lead pipe. The video is also interspersed with footage of the Monkees' 1987 concert tour and concludes with on-screen dialogue detailing the ultimate fates of the girl and the three Monkees. "Every Step of the Way" debuted on Nickelodeon's Nick Rocks on November 6, 1987.

== Critical reception ==
The album was not a particular commercial or critical success, only reaching No. 72 on the Billboard 200. Only one single from the album, "Heart and Soul", managed to make the Billboard Hot 100 chart, peaking at No. 87. The follow-up single, a remixed version of "Every Step of the Way", failed to chart.

The album cover was featured on the Pitchfork list of "The Worst Record Covers of All Time".

== Track listing ==
Side one
No.	Title	Lead vocals	Length
1.	"Heart and Soul" (Simon Byrne, Andrew Howell)	Micky Dolenz	3:55
2.	"(I'd Go The) Whole Wide World" (Eric Goulden)	Dolenz	2:56
3.	"Long Way Home" (Dick Eastman, Bobby Hart)	Davy Jones	3:50
4.	"Secret Heart" (Brian Fairweather, Martin Page)	Dolenz	3:46
5.	"Gettin' In" (Peter Tork)	Peter Tork	3:03
6.	"(I'll) Love You Forever" (Davy Jones)	Jones	3:22

Side two
No.	Title	Lead vocals	Length
1.	"Every Step of the Way" (Mark Clarke, Ian Hunter)	Jones	3:21
2.	"Don't Bring Me Down" (Tommy James, Tom Teeley, Glenn Wyka)	Dolenz	3:39
3.	"Midnight" (John David)	Dolenz	4:28
4.	"She's Movin' in with Rico" (Eddie Howell)	Jones	3:21
5.	"Since You Went Away" (Michael Levine)	Tork	2:36
6.	"Counting on You" (Alan Green)	Jones	3:46
Total length:			41:44

== Personnel ==
The Monkees

- Davy Jones – vocals
- Micky Dolenz – vocals
- Peter Tork – vocals; guitar ("Gettin' In")

Additional musicians

- Curly Smith – drums
- Mark Christian – guitar
- George Hawkins – bass
- Davey Faragher – bass
- Mike Egizi – keyboards, programming
- Craig Ostbo – percussion
- Roger Béchirian – percussion, synthesizer ("Gettin' In")
- Andy Cahan – piano ("(I'll) Love You Forever")
- Lou Natkin – guitar ("Every Step of the Way", "(I'll) Love You Forever", "She's Movin' in with Rico")
- Dan Sawyer – acoustic guitar ("Counting on You", "(I'll) Love You Forever")
- Dave Sutton – bass ("She's Movin' in With Rico")
- Jim Thompson – saxophone ("Secret Heart", "Every Step of the Way")
- Matt Harris – backing vocals ("Heart and Soul", "Every Step of the Way")

Technical

- Roger Bechirian – producer, arrangements, engineer, mixing
- Robert Salcedo – engineer, mixing
- Harold Bronson – executive producer
- Lou Naktin – musical supervisor
- Cliff Kane – assistant engineer
- Scott Gordon – assistant engineer
- Bernie Grundman – mastering
- Gary Burden – art supervision, design
- Don Brown – art supervision
- Henry Diltz – photography
- Delana Bettoli – photo illustration
- Lisa Sutton – graphics assistance
- Maria Berry – graphics assistance
- Mike Egizi – string arrangements

== Charts ==
Chart (1987)	Peak position
US Billboard Top Pop Albums	72
