= Saturday's Child =

1966 song by the Monkees

Song by The Monkees

from the album The Monkees
- Released: 1966
- Genre: Garage rock; pop
- Length: 2:43
- Label: Colgems
- Songwriter: David Gates

"Saturday's Child" is a song by American pop rock band The Monkees, from their 1966 debut album The Monkees. The song features Micky Dolenz on lead vocals. It was written by Bread frontman David Gates. The song is an electric guitar–based rock song. It is widely regarded as one of their best album tracks, with AMG critic Matthew Greenwald saying that it has a "proto-heavy metal guitar riff" and it is "one of the more interesting curios of the early Monkees catalog". Though it was never released as a single, it has been included on several of The Monkees' greatest hits albums.

"Saturday's Child" was included on the episode "Monkee vs. Machine" of the series The Monkees, which aired on 26 September 1966. This section of the episode, which doubles as a promotional video for the song, shows The Monkees playing around on the beach and having fun with five children (at any one time), in a dune buggy, on a swing set, on slides, on a jungle gym, on a horse, on unicycles, and on Honda Super Cub motorcycles, and hamming it up driving the Monkeemobile around Southern California.

While originally published by Screen Gems-Columbia Music (BMI) in 1966, the rights are now held by Sony/ATV Tunes LLC (ASCAP).

Herman's Hermits recorded a more acoustic version of the song and released it on their 1967 album There's a Kind of Hush All Over the World.

Indie rock band Guided by Voices has regularly covered it in their live sets.

== See also ==
- Monday's Child
- Tuesday's Child (disambiguation)
- Wednesday's Child (disambiguation)
- Thursday's Child (disambiguation)
- Friday's Child (disambiguation)
- Sunday's Child
