= David Neal (actor) =

English actor (1932–2000)

- Born: David Henry Neal; 13 February 1932; Desborough, Northamptonshire, England, U.K
- Died: 27 June 2000 (aged 68); Kettering, Northamptonshire, England, U.K.
- Occupation: Actor
- Years active: 1962-1997

David Neal (13 February 1932 – 27 June 2000) was an English television actor, active from the 1960s into the 1990s. He is chiefly remembered for a range of supporting roles in major productions.

== Multiple supporting roles in popular television ==
Although very rarely cast in a lead role, David Neal had significant supporting roles in episodes of a range of popular British television series, including Softly, Softly, Z-Cars, Doctor Who, Inspector Morse, Poirot, The Bill, Wycliffe, The Gaffer (TV series), (as the Golf Club Secretary, in the episode 'Moonlight and Ruses'), and Noah's Castle. He also did radio voice work.

== Classical acting ==
David Neal worked in a broad range of roles during his career. In 1970 he took a major supporting role (Cinna) in the all-star feature film of Shakespeare's Julius Caesar (which starred Charlton Heston, Christopher Lee, Richard Chamberlain, Diana Rigg and Sir John Gielgud). A few years later (in 1979) he secured another significant supporting role as Richard le Scrope, Archbishop of York in both Henry IV, Part 1 and Henry IV, Part 2 in the BBC's major 'complete works of Shakespeare' series of television films. He later appeared in Jonathan Miller's productions of Timon of Athens and Antony and Cleopatra for the same series.

== The Flockton Flyer ==
Although Neal is not remembered for lead roles, an exception is the 1970s' children's television production The Flockton Flyer, written by Peter Whitbread, in which he played the principal character, Bob Carter. The programme ran to two series, with an associated paperback novel. He later played the lead role of the father in the 1980 TV series Noah's Castle with Simon Gipps-Kent and Mike Reid.

== Filmography ==
Year	Title	Role	Notes
1969	The Cut-Throats	German Officer in Convoy	
1970	Julius Caesar	Cinna the Conspirator	
1978	Superman	7th Elder	(Krypton Council)
1980	Flash Gordon	Captain of Ming's Air Force	
1993	M. Butterfly	Judge	
1995	Feast of July	Mitchy Mitchell	
