= Follyfoot =

British children's TV series (1971–1973)

- Created by: Based on an idea by Monica Dickens
- Starring: Gillian Blake; Steve Hodson; Christian Rodska; Desmond Llewelyn; Arthur English
- Countries of origin: United Kingdom; West Germany
- No. of series: 3
- No. of episodes: 39

Production
- Camera setup: Single camera
- Running time: 30 minutes

Original release
- Network: Yorkshire Television for ITV
- Release: 28 June 1971 – 15 September 1973

Follyfoot is a children's television series co-produced by the majority-partner British television company Yorkshire Television (for transmission on ITV) and the independent West German company TV München (for transmission on the ZDF channel). It aired in the United Kingdom between 1971 and 1973, repeated for two years after that and again in the late 1980s. The series starred Gillian Blake in the lead role. Notable people connected with the series were actors Desmond Llewelyn and Arthur English and directors Jack Cardiff, Stephen Frears, Michael Apted and David Hemmings.

It was originally inspired by Monica Dickens' 1963 novel Cobbler's Dream (republished in 1995 as New Arrival at Follyfoot); she later wrote four further books in conjunction with the series—Follyfoot in 1971, Dora at Follyfoot in 1972, The Horses of Follyfoot in 1975, and Stranger at Follyfoot in 1976.

== Background and production ==
The series, which was filmed on the Harewood family estate, was set at a home of rest for horses. Despite an apparent appeal limited to young girls with an equine interest, Follyfoot was actually aimed squarely at the teenage market and often had challenging things to say about the treatment of horses and animals generally in British society. The ethos of Follyfoot generally was to give another chance to both horses and people who had been rejected by the rest of society: the stance of the series was recognisably pro-animal, and characters who resembled the archetypes of the Pullein-Thompson sisters et al were overwhelmingly shown in a negative light. Continuity in the series was assured by the use of mainly one writer, Tony Essex, who wrote 34 of the 39 episodes.

The series' theme song, "The Lightning Tree", written by Francis Essex, the brother of Tony Essex and sung by The Settlers, is well-remembered, sometimes more so than the series itself. The song reached No. 36 in the UK charts in 1971. An album featuring music from the series was also released.

The main actors were Gillian Blake as Dora, Steve Hodson as Steve, Christian Rodska as Ron Stryker, Desmond Llewelyn as the Colonel and Arthur English as Slugger. Other well-known actors in minor roles included Pam St Clement, Gretchen Franklin, as the Colonel's housekeeper, and Kathy Staff in two separate bit parts. What really characterised the series was its rotation of directors, many of whom have since become revered figures in the UK film industry, including Stephen Frears, Michael Apted and Jack Cardiff who took time out from working overseas with Kirk Douglas to direct two episodes of the series. Also, in the third series, David Hemmings appeared in one episode, "Uncle Joe" and also directed two other episodes during the show's production run: "The Bridge Builder" and the final episode, "Walk In the Wood".

The series proved to be a success and was sold to many countries at the time of the original UK transmission. The first series won the Harlequin award for best production at the 1972 BAFTA Awards, while the second series episode, "The Debt", reached the top 20 in the weekly television ratings—a rarity for an afternoon-timeslot show. During production for the third series, it was intended that this would be the last, a film version of Follyfoot was planned, but the idea was ultimately shelved. The children's magazine Look-in featured a picture-strip of the series each week as well as regular features, while five annuals were released in association with Yorkshire Television. These ran until 1976—long after the series had finished. There was also a Follyfoot board game released.

== Characters ==
=== Main characters ===
- Dora Maddocks (Gillian Blake): the series' central character and niece of The Colonel. The daughter of a bigwig ambassador, she has spent a miserable childhood because her parents have never understood her and being showered with material possessions was no compensation. In Series 2 ep 4, she recalls the pain of her 10th birthday where, instead of getting the pony she wanted, she instead got the most expensive dresses available. The story begins when Dora is sent to live with the Colonel when her parents leave for a government commission in South America—when she discovers Follyfoot farm, Dora finds her idyll. Dora is an idealist and a dreamer; she cannot cope with change and tries to shut out the fact the world is full of bad people. When the Colonel signs Follyfoot over to her, Dora desperately tries to keep the farm running as it always has done, despite this becoming increasingly impractical and the resulting tension with her love interest, Steve. Her disillusionment with the elite world she was brought up in is redolent of Monica Dickens's own feelings in the 1930s (she had been a debutante, but abandoned that privileged life to go into domestic service).
- Steve Ross (Steve Hodson): Miner's son and former reform school pupil who served time in prison for lashing out at a man he found whipping a horse. A very competent horseman, he comes to work at Follyfoot after his previous employer, the Squire, refuses to believe he wasn't involved in an attack on his horses. Steve believes in the same values as Dora but through life experiences has a more realistic view of the world and this causes increasing tension with Dora throughout the second and especially the third series. He has an emotional attachment with Dora and wishes he could be more idealist like her.
- Ron Stryker (Christian Rodska): the third of the trio of young workers at Follyfoot but also the shadiest. He is known to the police and one of his friends is Lewis Hammond, member of local miscreant gang the Night Riders. His father persuaded the Colonel to give him a job at Follyfoot to help keep him out of trouble, yet Ron is workshy and ignores constant warnings not to burst through the main gate at Follyfoot with his distinctive Triumph Tiger motorbike. Despite the rough exterior, Ron is essentially warm-hearted and loves the horses as much as everyone else. Ron is already working at Follyfoot when Dora, then Steve, arrive.
- Slugger Jones (Arthur English): ex-boxer and "housekeeper" at Follyfoot Farm who has been working for the Colonel for over 20 years. He proves to be an emotional rock for Dora but will readily tell her to "snap out of it" where necessary. Slugger is gruff yet cuddly at the same time and is rather fond of Ron despite their love-hate façade. His cookery is notorious for its lack of variety—bacon and eggs or stew!
- Colonel Geoffrey Maddocks (Desmond Llewelyn): Dora's uncle and the original owner of Follyfoot farm. He started Follyfoot years ago as his response to all the cruelty in the world and his attempt to do something about it. The Colonel has a reputation as a kindly eccentric and is the first person most people call on when they've got a horse in need of rehoming. He thinks the world of Dora and proves to be more of a father to her than her actual father, but an illness weakens him in Series 2 and when he signs Follyfoot over to Dora, she must increasingly have to manage under her own steam. He comes over, broadly, as a One Nation Tory, very much of the centre ground.

=== Minor characters ===
- Lewis Hammond (Paul Guess): known locally as "The Louse", Ron's friend and leader of motorcycle thugs the Night Riders. He is complicit in the death of two of the Squire's horses, which leads to Steve being wrongly implicated and sacked.
- Callie Holmes (Gillian Bailey): teenage schoolgirl who occasionally helps out at Follyfoot. In the episode Moonstone, Callie coerces Steve into helping her hide a horse she's stolen from the circus, believing the animal to be unhappy. Steve is naturally twitchy because of his criminal past. Callie has a crush on Steve.
- Gip Willens (Bryan Sweeney): young boy who loves horses but has little idea how to look after them. After Ron spins him a line about Follyfoot being a place where horses are tortured, Steve has his work cut out trying to convince him otherwise and it takes the near-death of Gip's horse to win him round.
- Wendy Bendiger (Elaine Donnelly): a brief love-interest for Steve, which causes much upset for Dora. She eventually breaks up with him, which Steve puts down to their class difference.
- Sam Lockwood (Frederick Treves): unscrupulous horse trader who is in it only for the money and does not care whether his animals are going to good homes. He proves the main series villain in Series 3, with Follyfoot having to take in two of his animals. His son Chip (Nigel Crewe) briefly dates Dora but he is too loyal to his father for the relationship to progress.
- Hazel Donnelly (Veronica Quilligan): 14-year-old reform school delinquent sent to Follyfoot by the probation service. Dora takes an initial dislike to her, especially when she almost attacks her favourite horse Copper and forms a bond with Steve, but Hazel is essentially a younger version of Dora with the same background and strained relationship with her parents. After a volatile start she takes to working at Follyfoot and it is widely thought among the show's fans Hazel would have become a regular character had the series continued.
- Another recurring (but very minor) character is the Vet (unnamed), played by Geoffrey Morris, who appears in several episodes during series 2 and 3. A second vet, played by Colin Rix, appeared in the first and last episodes of series 1 and in both cases was seen putting a sick horse out of its misery.

== Episodes ==
=== Series overview ===
Series	Episodes	Originally released	
Series	Episodes	First released	Last released
1	13	28 June 1971	20 September 1971
2	13	28 May 1972	27 August 1972
3	13	23 June 1973	15 September 1973

=== Series 1 (1971) ===
No.	Title	Directed by	Written by	Original release date
1	"Dora"	Stephen Frears	Francis Stevens	28 June 1971
Dora comes to stay with her Uncle, the Colonel, who owns Follyfoot farm. While out riding she sees some thugs terrorising the horses of a neighbouring farm. Steve, a young man working on the farm tries to stop them. Two of the horses are injured and must be shot. Despite Dora's testimony, Steve is under suspicion as being one of the thugs. Cast: Terence De Marney (Groom), Paul Guess (Lewis Hammond), Basil Henson (Arthur Maddocks), Paul Luty (Groom), William Mervyn (Squire Mathews), Dorothy Reynolds (Prudence Maddocks), Colin Rix (Vet)
2	"Steve"	Frederic Goode	Francis Stevens	5 July 1971
Steve is hiding out at Follyfoot. The neighbouring farm is on the lookout for a missing horse. Steve and Dora find the horse and try to rescue it as it is lame and know it will be shot. They are caught with the horse and Steve is blamed. He is fired from his job, but the Colonel steps in and takes him on at Follyfoot. Cast: Gillian Bailey (Callie Holmes), Paul Guess (Lewis Hammond), Greg Powell (3rd Man), David Richardson (Groom), Edward Underdown (Matthew)
3	"Gypsy"	Ian McFarlane	Francis Stevens	12 July 1971
A gypsy who has just been released from prison comes to collect his horse. Two local farmers capture his horse and threaten to shoot him if he comes onto their land again. Steve steps in to help, but gets caught and locked up by the farmers. Posing as a gypsy he threatens to curse them and they let him and the horse go. Cast: Tommy Boyle (Gypsy), Howard Goorney (Reuben Kellett), Arthur Lambert (Policeman), Walter Sparrow (Amos Kellett)
4	"Shadow"	Frederic Goode	Audley Southcott	19 July 1971
Dora agrees to take on a show-jumping horse that needs training. As she makes progress, co-worker Ron takes the horse to run in a local race. He aims to make a lot of money by betting on it, but the horse is not ready and refuses to jump, landing Ron in trouble with the bookmakers – and Dora. Cast: Virginia Denham (Isobel Mathews), Paul Guess (Lewis Hammond), Sam Kydd (Bookmaker), William Mervyn (Squire Mathews)
5	"One White Foot Charley"	Ian McFarlane	Francis Stevens	26 July 1971
Thug Hammond is riding a lame horse. In disguise, Dora manages to trick her way into his stables and rescues the horse. Meanwhile, an old miner tracks down Follyfoot to visit his 30-year-old horse, Charley. Cast: Gillian Bailey (Callie Holmes), Wallace Campbell (Vet), Christopher Coll (George Platt), Kay Gallie (George's wife), Paul Guess (Lewis Hammond), Keith James (Shopkeeper), Bert Palmer (Tom Platt), Kathy Staff (Woman)
6	"The Charity Horse"	Stephen Frears	Francis Stevens	2 August 1971
A local rag-and-bone man has died. The son endeavours to keep the business going but the horse is killed in an accident. His plight is reported in the local newspaper and another horse is bought for the family. It turns out that the horse is unable for the job and they take it to Follyfoot. However as the youngest son, Gip is devastated at losing the horse, the family decide to keep it. Cast: Rio Fanning (Reporter), Len Jones (Willy Willens), John Lyons (Photographer), Margery Mason (Mrs. Willens), Bryan Sweeney (Gip Willens)
7	"Know-All's Nag"	Stephen Frears	Francis Stevens	9 August 1971
Gip continues to look after their horse but as Steve becomes involved, he is worried that the family don't know how to properly care for it. The older brother wants rid of the horse so Gip runs away with it. Steve finds them and persuades him to give up the horse to Follyfoot where it can be properly looked after. Cast: Len Jones (Willy Willens), Margery Mason (Mrs. Willens), Bryan Sweeney (Gip Willens)
8	"Moonstone"	Michael Apted	Francis Stevens	16 August 1971
Local girl Callie is upset at the treatment of one of the horses while at the Circus. Appealing to the Colonel, she tries to get help, but to no avail. Undeterred, she steals the horse and with the help of Steve, hides it away. As the Police investigate, the horse is discovered, but by then the Colonel has agreed to buy the horse from the Circus. Cast: Gillian Bailey (Callie Holmes), Celia Hewitt (Anna Holmes), Bernadette Milnes (Noreen), Stephen Bent (Noreen's partner), Ted Carroll (Man), George Waring (Bert)
9	"Stryker's Good Deed"	Maurice Hatton	Audley Southcott, Jennifer Stuart	23 August 1971
Ron takes a horse back to Follyfoot after its owner has fallen ill. Unknown to them, the boy Gip had agreed to look after it, but the horse runs away. In attempting to catch it, Dora falls off her horse and is injured. The horse returns to the man's house and Gip agrees to take care of it until its owner is well again. Cast: Maxine Barrie (Nurse), Terry Cantor (2nd Bystander), Lynne Perrie (Woman), Sammy Sharples (Simpkins), Bryan Sweeney (Gip Willens), John Swindells (Policeman)
10	"Mr She Knows"	Vic Hughes	Francis Stevens	30 August 1971
A mysterious old man arrives at Follyfoot and sits silently with one of the horses. Ron taunts the old man into getting him to leave but the Colonel is angered by Ron's behaviour and sacks him. The old man has recently lost his wife and the horse used to be his. To make amends, Ron's father agrees to pay for a stable to be built at the man's house for the horse. Cast: Tommy Godfrey (Mr Stryker), Richard Goolden (Mr Mallet)
11	"The Standstill Horse"	Ian McFarlane	Francis Stevens	6 September 1971
The Night riders are back to their old tricks and upset a horse ridden by a crippled girl. Steve warns them off, but they come back later and kill the horse. Dora trains one of her horses to accommodate the girl as a present. Her father, although angry at the situation, agrees to let her ride again. Cast: Petra Markham (Ginny Tuckwood), Paul Guess (Lewis Hammond), Tony Steedman (Mr. Tuckwood), Paul Frith (Young Boy), Reginald Barratt (Doctor)
12	"Birthday at Follyfoot"	Michael Tuchner	Audley Southcott	13 September 1971
Ron and Steve argue over who gets to host Dora's birthday. Unable to come to an agreement, they enter a jousting contest. When neither of them wins, Slugger tells them that he and the Colonel already have a party planned. Cast: Kareen Hofsass (Little Girl)
13	"A Day in the Sun"	Mike Purcell	Francis Stevens	20 September 1971
In search of his mother, Steve visits his grandmother. While there, he is told of a badly injured horse and he takes it back to Follyfoot. The horse is so ill it has to be shot. Steve leaves Follyfoot to continue searching for his mother, much to Dora's distress. She collapses against the lightning tree and is dragged away sobbing by Slugger. Cast: Margaret Boyd (Steve's Grandmother), Ted Carroll (Horse Owner), Rosamund Greenwood (Aunt Millie), Arthur Hewlett (Old Man), Colin Rix (Vet)

=== Series 2 (1972) ===
No.	Title	Directed by	Written by	Original release date
14	"Someone, Somewhere"	Claude Watham	Francis Stevens	28 May 1972
Dora is missing Steve, but puts on a brave face as an abandoned horse is brought in. She agrees to look after it until she finds the owner. Meanwhile, Steve is in Liverpool looking for his mother, who is in trouble with the Police. She has gone into hiding, but eventually he manages to track her down and they are reunited for the first time in years. Cast: Ivan Beavis (Liverpool Policeman), Sheila Fay (Julie's Mother), Jane Hutcheson (Julie), Clare Kelly (Katherine Ross), Charles Lamb (Old Man in Cafe), Harry Littlewood (Bargee), Fulton Mackay (Mr. Wilmot), Harry Markham (Hercules' Owner), Kathleen Michael (Mrs. Wilmot), Leslie Schofield (2nd Policeman), Pam St. Clement (Cafe Assistant), George Waring (Bert)
15	"The Debt"	Claude Watham	Francis Stevens	4 June 1972
Having found his mother, Steve is determined to keep her out of trouble and pay off her debts. He takes on two jobs and rents a flat for them both, eventually earning enough money to meet her debts. She squanders the money and as the Police catch up with her, she tells him to stay out of her life. Dejected, Steve returns to Follyfoot to an emotional Dora. Cast: Clare Kelly (Katherine Ross), Joe Ritchie (Bert), Ivan Beavis (Liverpool Policeman), Michael Collins (Garage Owner), Leslie Dwyer (Mr. Wimble), Maggie Flint (Mrs. Widgeon), Janet Hargreaves (Lady Millicent Longchild), Andrew Sweeney (Small Boy)
16	"Family of Strangers"	Desmond Davis	Francis Stevens, Christine Bright	11 June 1972
Cleo, a friend of Dora's has come to stay for a few days. Dora is concerned that this former horse lover now won't go anywhere near the stables due to a recent accident. Steve and Dora set up a plan to get her riding again, but in a mishap, Steve's leg gets caught in a poacher's trap. In desperation, Cleo mounts a horse and rides for help. Cast: Valerie Holliman (Cleo)
17	"A Present for Sandy"	Desmond Davis	Francis Stevens	25 June 1972
Steve has rescued a horse from a burning house and brings it to Follyfoot. A man claiming to be the owner takes it, but later, his daughter in law claims it is hers. Dora is determined to help and with an unwilling Steve, they attempt to take the horse back, but are caught. The man tells them that he is giving the horse to his daughter in law's son for his birthday. Cast: Geraldine Newman (Janet Draper), Kathleen St. John (Old Lady), Simon Thompson (Sandy Draper), Lewis Wilson (Ambulance Man), Jack Woolgar (Seth Draper)
18	"The Innocents"	Desmond Davis	Francis Stevens	2 July 1972
Dora is concerned when she hears of a miners strike and that the horses are being left in the mine to starve. She and Steve go to the picket line and demand the horses be freed. She along with some other likeminded miners free the horses at night but are caught. The fate of the horses is put to a vote and the Colonel agrees to help the miners in their plight. Cast: Terence Davies (Davey), Colin Douglas (Matt), Harold Goodwin (Bill), Godfrey James (Willie), Brian Osborne (Tyler), Bert Palmer (Tom Platt), Ron Pember (Picket #1), Tim Pearce (Picket #2), Peter Porteous (Wally), Ken Watson (Charlie), Phil Woods (Ben)
19	"The Hundred Pound Horse"	Jack Cardiff	Rosemary Anne Sisson	9 July 1972
A young boy asks Dora if she can stable his horse, which he claims is a Grand National winner worth a hundred pounds. The boy's father runs the local amusement fair and says that he has to sell the horse, which is worthless. Dora and the others intervene, but as the boy runs away with the horse, his father desperately tries to find him. Once found, they tell the boy his horse is indeed very special. Cast: Keith Buckley (Geoff Shaw), Marc Granger (Tim Shaw)
20	"Poor Bald Head"	Michael Apted	Francis Stevens	16 July 1972
The Colonel is selling one of the Follyfoot horses, to Dora's upset. However, they need the room for more deserving cases. One such case occurs when a local coalman is working his horse to death. Dora is distressed, but Steve tells her they can't take any more horses. Dora relents and the horse is sold, leaving room for them to take in the workhorse. Cast: John Barrett (Ernie Perkins), Elaine Donnelly (Wendy Bendiger), Jack Le White (Weighman), Daphne Oxenford (Secretary), Clifford Rose (Mr. Dockerty), David Swift (Mr. Bendiger)
21	"The Prize"	Jack Cardiff	Francis Stevens	23 July 1972
Follyfoot is hosting a cross-country race, which Dora goes on to win. She is more concerned however that Steve is growing increasingly interested in another girl, Wendy. They see a lot of each other and Dora finds it hard to conceal her jealousy. Wendy goes to see Dora and makes friends with her. Cast: Elaine Donnelly (Wendy Bendiger), Geoffrey Morris (Vet)
22	"Treasure Hunt"	Gerry Mill	Francis Stevens	30 July 1972
Follyfoot has been asked to take in a horse by an old woman who has lived with her sister for 20 years, but they have never spoken to each other. When one of them falls ill, the other breaks down and agrees to go and see her. Wendy and Steve break up and Dora reveals to Steve her feelings for him. Steve tells her that they can only ever be friends due to the closeness of their working relationship. Cast: Walter Horsbrugh (Doctor), Larry Noble (Tanner), Dorothea Rundle (Agnes Derwent), Betty Turner (Emily Derwent)
23	"Debt of Honour"	Eric Price	Rosemary Anne Sisson	6 August 1972
Lady Crane, a friend of the Colonel asks for one her fine horses to be kept at Follyfoot. Meanwhile, Ron is being chased by a bookmaker over non-payment of debt. It turns out that the bookmaker is also seeking payment from Lady Carne. She has kept her horse at Follyfoot because he was going to take it in lieu. She agrees to sell her manor house and keep her horse and pay the debt. Cast: Wolfe Morris (Parkes), Ambrosine Phillpotts (Lady Martha Carne)
24	"Out of the Blue Horse"	Peter Hammond	Francis Stevens	13 August 1972
While visiting, Callie tells Dora that she's going to boarding school and must give up her horse. She and Dora find a stable, but there is already a horse in there and terribly ill. She confronts the owner who is purposely doing it to entice his estranged daughter back home. With the help of Steve and the Colonel, she takes the horse. Callie's horse is allowed to stay at Follyfoot as well. Cast: Gillian Bailey (Callie Holmes), Beryl Cooke (Headmistress), Shelagh Fraser (Vera Berwick), John Stratton (Arnold Berwick) | (NOTE: Christian Rodska does not appear in this episode)
25	"The Awakening"	Desmond Davis	Francis Stevens	20 August 1972
Dora and Steve are invited to the Colonel's house for lunch to meet a young friend of his. But Dora takes an instant disliking to him due to his boasting. She challenges him to a show-jumping race, which he confirms he will win. While it's going on, the Colonel is taken ill and Dora abandons the race. She later realises that his ill health could mean the end of Follyfoot. Cast: Anthony Andrews (Lord Beck), Brenda Cowling (Lady Caroline Beck), Gretchen Franklin (Mrs. Porter), Walter Horsbrugh (Doctor), Ralph Lawton (Doctor at Gymkhana)
26	"Fly Away Home"	Desmond Davis	Francis Stevens	27 August 1972
Dora is keeping a vigil for the Colonel, who is very ill. Her parents arrive with the view to taking her home and Steve is getting ready to leave, as it looks as though this will be the end of Follyfoot. Dora confides in her father that she doesn't want to go with them. The Colonel gets up from his sickbed to meet with his solicitor. He announces to them that he has now signed over ownership of Follyfoot to Dora. Cast: Rosamond Burne (Florist), Gretchen Franklin (Mrs. Porter), Basil Henson (Arthur Maddocks), Dorothy Reynolds (Prudence Maddocks), Peter Schofield (Van Driver), Anthony Woodruff (Bricklebank), Jean Lockhart (Shopkeeper)

=== Series 3 (1973) ===
No.	Title	Directed by	Written by	Original release date
27	"The Distant Voice"	Stephen Frears	Francis Stevens	23 June 1973
Dora is now the owner of Follyfoot, but Steve is unsure whether she'll be able to handle the responsibility. Dora takes in a horse that is infected and is liable to spread to all the other horses. One of the horse owners insists his horses are taken away and complains to the Colonel. The horse improves however and the owner's faith is restored. Cast: Alastair Hunter (Mr. Carson), Mollie Maureen (Mrs. Padgett), Geoffrey Morris (Vet)
28	"The Four Legged Hat"	Gareth Davies	Francis Stevens	30 June 1973
On seeing a horse being worked to death, Dora intervenes and offers the owner one of her horses to replace his. A conman, he agrees to swap only if she gives him £20. Dora requests money at Follyfoot, saying it's for a hat, and she gives him the money. He then however sells the horse to be sold on at auction. Dora and Ron go to the auction and convince the Colonel to buy the horse. Cast: John Cater (Clem Barrett), Betty Turner (Mrs. Barrett), Ron Welling (Horse Owner), Peter Whitbread (Auctioneer), Ray Witch (Shopkeeper)
29	"Barney"	Antony R. Thomas	Francis Stevens	7 July 1973
A man comes to Follyfoot to buy a horse for his daughter. Dora and Steve accompany the family to nearby Lockwoods, a crooked seller of horses. The horse they buy is drugged and when they get it home, it turns violent. Dora agrees to take the horse for training after they threaten to shoot it. Successfully taming it, the family arrive back and hire Dora to train their new horse. Cast: Norman Atkyns (Mr. Buckley), Nigel Crewe (Chip Lockwood), Lesley Roach (Angie Buckley), Frederick Treves (Sam Lockwood), Ann Way (Mrs. Buckley)
30	"Miss Him When He's Gone"	Peter Hammond	Francis Stevens	14 July 1973
A bad-tempered fruit and veg seller has a heart attack. His son tells him that he's taking over the horse and cart business, but his father forbids him to. The younger son contacts Dora to hide the horse for fear of his father shooting it. The Police investigate and bring it back. At night, the father sets fire to the stable, killing himself and setting the horse free. The family do not mourn him. Cast: John Barrie (Ed Foley), Richard Beaumont (Gavin Foley), Freda Jeffries (Cauliflower Woman), Barbara Keogh (Apple Woman), Ray Mort (Policeman), Norma Shebbeare (Minnie Foley), Leon Vitali (Brian Foley), Jo Warne (Onion Woman)
31	"The Dream"	Ken Hannam	Francis Stevens	21 July 1973
Dora has a nightmare where horses are being terrorised and Steve is covered in blood. The next morning she hears that Lockwood's estate has been ravaged by bikers and four of their horses are dead. Lockwood blames it on a local builder who sues him for slander. Dora gets involved but she is threatened. Steve steps in and fights the man responsible. To Dora's horror, he emerges covered in blood. Cast: Colin Bell (Johnnie Clegg), Nigel Crewe (Chip Lockwood), Bill Dean (Mr. Clegg), Stan Jay (Linnett), Gorden Kaye (Man with Court Order), Norman Mitchell (Policeman), Geoffrey Morris (Vet), Frederick Treves (Sam Lockwood)
32	"The Challenge"	Jack Cardiff	Francis Stevens	28 July 1973
Lockwood sets a challenge: £100 for anyone who can outrace his horse. Dora intends to enter on a customer's horse, but withdraws when she becomes friendly with Lockwood's son Chip. Due to his shady dealings Lockwood tells his son to distance himself from Dora. She goes to the race to be told by Chip that he will always be loyal to his father. Cast: Raymond Adamson (Major Lewis), Nigel Crewe (Chip Lockwood), Frederick Treves (Sam Lockwood) | NOTE: Desmond Llewellyn did not appear in this episode.
33	"The Letter"	Jack Cardiff	Francis Stevens	4 August 1973
Dora, Steve and Ron are investigating into some illegal activities by Lockwood. Chip, is unable to help them, but he sends a letter to Dora explaining everything and his feelings for her. Lockwood dumps the illegal horses and Follyfoot take them in. With the evidence of the letter they agree not to go to the Police, but warn him that he must give up any further dealings with horses. Chip decides to move away. Cast: John Barrard (Pilkington), Ted Carroll (Man), Nigel Crewe (Chip Lockwood), Ruth Holden (Mrs. Dickerson), George Malpas (Mr. Plum), Kathy Staff (Woman), Jill Summers (Mrs. Ginwood), Frederick Treves (Sam Lockwood), Garth Watkins (Parkinson), Tracy Eddon (Lisa Pilkington) | NOTE: Desmond Llewellyn did not appear in this episode.
34	"The Bridge Builder"	David Hemmings	Francis Stevens	11 August 1973
While teaching some schoolkids to ride, Dora comes across a gypsy camp. Their daughter has been forced out of the school and have had to move to an unsuitable area. Dora and Steve help them as their horses are sick. Dora gives them some in return for letting them take the sick ones in. She speaks to the headmistress to deaf ears, but Dora insists on helping them. Cast: Beryl Cooke (Miss Patience), Peter Copley (Sir John), Sue Cornell (Jacqueline), Lynne Frederick (Tina), Simon Roebuck (Simon)
35	"Uncle Joe"	Peter Hammond	Francis Stevens and Rosemary Gee	18 August 1973
The parents of two children Dora is teaching to ride are killed in a car accident. Dora, Steve and Ron find their uncle. They get to know him and Dora falls for him, much to Steve's jealousy, who makes an effort to get close to Tina, the Gypsy girl. The Uncle adopts the two children and tells Dora he is engaged. Steve laughs at Dora and due to his insensitivity, Tina walks away. Cast: Paul Ambrose (Jackie), Beryl Cooke (Miss Patience), Chloe Franks (Angela), Lynne Frederick (Tina), Neil Hallett (Mr. Whitaker), David Hemmings (Uncle Joe Rimmington), Charles Pemberton (Police Sgt.)
36	"The Helping Hand"	Antony Thomas	Francis Stevens	25 August 1973
Dora is shocked when she discovers that the Colonel has enlisted the services of a manager to help Dora run Follyfoot. Steve thinks it's a good idea, as they need an extra pair of hands. The woman clashes with Dora over the worth of retired horses and sacks Ron who had caused a fire in one of the stables. Dora, and eventually Steve, tell her she is not right for Follyfoot and ask her to leave. Cast: Alethea Charlton (Phyllis Wetherby), Ronald Leigh-Hunt (Bernard Fox), Geoffrey Morris (Vet), Paul Whitsun-Jones (Fat Man) | NOTE: Desmond Llewellyn did not appear in this episode.
37	"Rain on Friday"	Michael Tuchner	Francis Stevens	1 September 1973
It is raining heavily and tensions are high. Steve tells Dora that they don't have enough room for their horses and has arranged for some to be farmed out to a local stable. Dora is furious and would prefer to keep the retired horses rather than the schooled ones that bring in money. Ron too gets caught up in the tensions and he and Steve fight. The Colonel arrives and agrees with Steve, but Dora is not happy. Cast: James Ottaway (Bill Chadwick)
38	"Hazel"	Michael Tuchner	Francis Stevens and Christine Bright	8 September 1973
An orphaned and troubled teenage girl, Hazel, is coming to stay at Follyfoot for a while. Dora has no time for her as she's looking after two sick horses, but Steve takes her under his wing. Hazel takes a dislike to Dora and rebels. After almost attacking a horse, she breaks down and Dora and Steve comfort her, but Dora is still unhappy with all the changes taking place. Cast: Veronica Quilligan (Hazel Donnelly), Gretchen Franklin (Mrs. Porter), Garfield Morgan (Brian Donnelly), Geoffrey Morris (Vet)
39	"Walk in the Wood"	David Hemmings	Francis Stevens	15 September 1973
To everyone's concern, Dora is considering leaving Follyfoot. She takes time out to think and eventually realises that the real problem doesn't lie with her. On confronting Steve, she asks him to leave. The following morning, she discusses things with the Colonel, who convinces her that everything will be all right. Steve and Dora forget their differences and a bittersweet Dora reflects on her time at Follyfoot. Cast: Veronica Quilligan (Hazel Donnelly), Alfons Kaminsky (Small Boy), Bernard Lee (Woodman), Geoffrey Morris (Vet), Walter Randall (Tinker), Paul Rosebury (Mick), Leyland Vincent (Policeman)

== Home releases ==
The first three episodes were released on video in 1995. No further releases ever came to light, and this video has long been deleted.

However, on DVD, Series 1 (episodes 1 to 13) was released in 2007. Series 2 was released on DVD in April 2008, with Series 3 following in October 2008. The DVDs are Region 2 encoded, and in PAL format. A complete boxset of the series was released in late 2008.

== Critical Reception ==
The book The Hill and Beyond: Children's Television Drama described Follyfoot as "a well-written series that never shied away from emotional complexities, cruelty and violence despite its sunny backdrop of the rolling Yorkshire Dales".
