= Thursday's Child =

Thursday's Child may refer to:

== Literature ==
- Thursday's Child (Streatfeild novel)
- Thursday's Child (Hartnett novel)
- Thursday's Child (Forrester novel), by Helen Forrester
- Thursday's Child, autobiography by Eartha Kitt
- Thursday's Child, a group of writers that met in El Cerrito, California, which included Marion Zimmer Bradley, Ursula K. le Guin, Chelsea Quinn Yarbro, and Anne Rice
- Thursday's Children, by Rumer Godden

== Music ==
- "Thursday's Child" (David Bowie song)
- "Thursday's Child" (Tanita Tikaram song)
- Minisode 2: Thursday's Child (Tomorrow x Together EP)

== Television and film ==
- Thursday's Child (1943 film)
- Thursday's Child (1983 film)
- Thursday's Child (television series), 1972-1973 British television series

== Other ==
- Thursday's Child (racing yacht), which took part at the BOC Challenge

== See also ==
- "Monday's Child" nursery rhyme
