= Dilhorne Park railway station =

Railway station in Staffordshire, England

Dilhorne Park
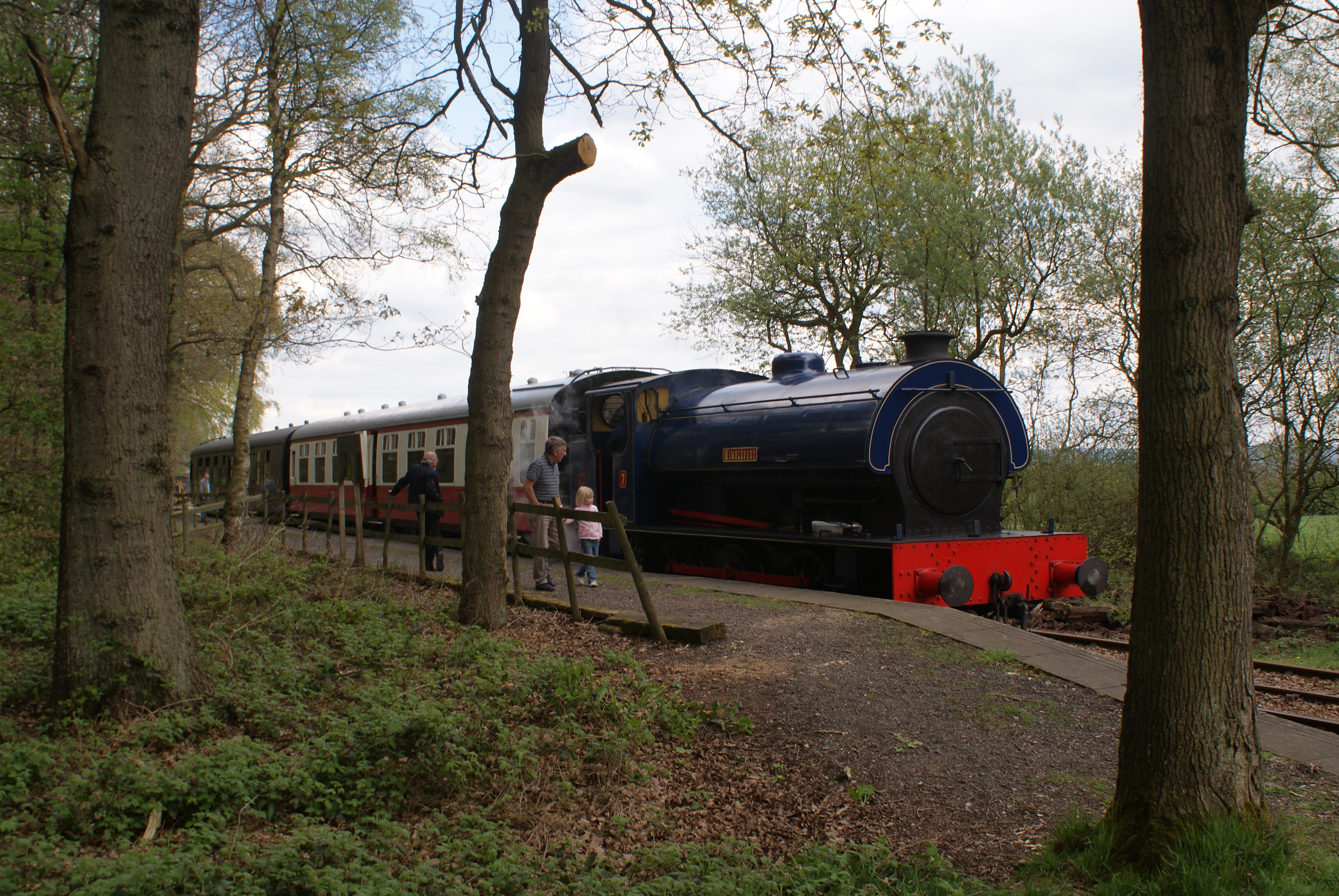

General information
- Location: Blythe Bridge, Staffordshire; England
- Coordinates: 53°0′0.00″N 2°2′49.00″W
- Grid reference: SJ 969447
- System: Station on heritage railway
- Manager: Foxfield Railway
- Platforms: 1
Location

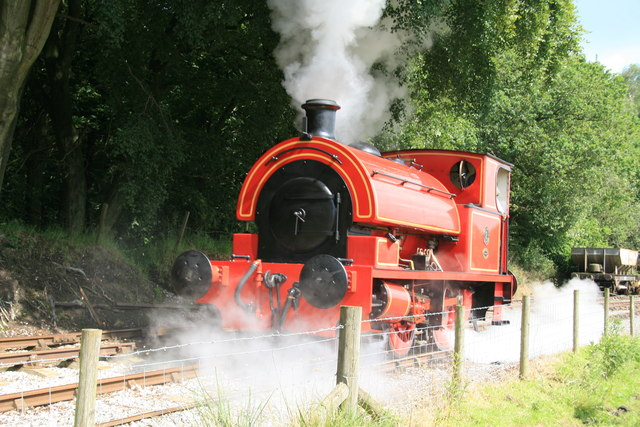
Bagnall No. 2 transferring between trains at Dilhorne Park railway station

Dilhorne Park railway station is a heritage railway station in Staffordshire on the Foxfield Railway. The station is a half set in a woodland. At 760 feet (230 m) above sea level, this station offers views across the Staffordshire Moorlands.

The station was the setting of Hanbury Halt in the BBC costume drama Cranford.
