= Gillian Blake =

British actress (born 1949)

- Born: Gillian Blake; 10 May 1949 (age 77); Buckingham, Buckinghamshire, England
- Education: Guildhall School of Music and Drama
- Occupation: Actress
- Years active: 1969–1980
- Notable work: Follyfoot
- Spouse: Peter Whitbread
- Children: Jake Whitbread

Gillian Blake (born 10 May 1949) is a retired British actress who is best known for her role as Dora in the 1970s tv series Follyfoot.

Blake studied acting at the Guildhall School of Music and Drama and began her professional career in the late 1960s. She appeared (uncredited) in the 1969 film Goodbye Mr. Chips. She went on to perform additional roles on television. In 1971 she landed the lead role in a Yorkshire Television Production Follyfoot, which ran for three series until 1973. Her last role of note was in two episodes of the BBC2 Playhouse series in 1980.

Blake has retired from acting, having spent some years concentrating on motherhood. She made a rare television appearance on This Is Your Life in 1995, celebrating the career of Desmond Llewelyn (her co-star in Follyfoot). In 1977, she married actor Peter Whitbread after meeting him on the set of Follyfoot. They had a son, Jake.
