= The Flockton Flyer =

Television series

- Written by: Peter Whitbread
- Directed by: Colin Nutley
- Starring: David Neal; Sheila Fearn; Anthony Sharp; Peter Duncan; Gwyneth Strong; Geoffrey Russell
- Theme music composer: Jugg Music
- Opening theme: The Flockton Flyer theme
- Ending theme: The Flockton Flyer theme
- Country of origin: United Kingdom
- Original language: English
- No. of series: 2
- No. of episodes: 17 written 12 filmed

Production
- Executive producer: Lewis Rudd
- Producer: Colin Nutley
- Production location: West Somerset Railway
- Camera setup: Joe Hardy; Peter Greenhalgh; Roy Page
- Running time: 30 minutes
- Production company: Southern Television

Original release
- Network: ITV
- Release: 18 April 1977 – 13 February 1978

The Flockton Flyer is a children's television series made by Southern Television for the ITV network. It was a popular programme, which ran to two series, and provided early screen appearances for upcoming actors such as Peter Duncan and Gwyneth Strong, as well as some well-known 1970s classical and situation comedy actors.

== Overview ==
The two series follow the adventures of the Carter family, as they struggle to re-open and run the old Flockton to Lane End branch railway, closed by British Rail five years previously. At the time of production (1976), many newly closed railway branch lines were being bought and preserved by local railway preservation societies, which has given rise to an extensive network of heritage railways in the United Kingdom.

The railway is said to have very limited rolling stock – one locomotive (restoration of which was completed in episode 1), one passenger coach (restoration of which was completed in episode 3), several freight vehicles (three are specifically mentioned and featured – an open wagon, a box van, and a tanker truck), and a hand-pumped inspection truck. Despite this plotline, large amounts of other rolling stock are regularly seen in the background of shots – multiple passenger coaches, various freight vehicles, a second steam tank locomotive (in steam) in the opening shots of episode 1, a diesel multiple unit in certain scenes, including the arrival of the Flockton Flyer to meet the road ambulance in episode 4, and a large GWR steam engine under tarpaulin sheeting at Flockton in episode 5. Although these other vehicles are not explained away in the script, there are various references to the nearby "mainline railway", and it may perhaps be assumed that shots involving otherwise unexplained rolling stock are shots of the Flockton line meeting the mainline railway. The direct connection of the two is confirmed by the storyline of episode 5 in the first series.

== Broadcast dates ==
There were two series, each of six episodes. Series 1 was first transmitted in spring 1977, and series 2 followed in early 1978. Programmes were shown at 4:45 pm on Monday afternoons.

Series 1 was repeated on ITV on Friday afternoons, commencing 8 September 1978; series 2 was repeated on Friday afternoons, commencing 7 December 1979, and running into January 1980.

Both series were again repeated on The Children's Channel, on cable TV in Britain during the early 1990s. Dubbed versions of the programmes were shown on Dutch and German TV stations.

In 2010, reruns of The Flockton Flyer were shown on the now-defunct British satellite television channel Film 24.

In August and September 2015, reruns of the series were shown on UK satellite channel Talking Pictures TV. Also repeated as a rerun from 1 December 2025 again on UK Freeview channel 82 Talking Pictures TV.

== Location ==
Location filming, during 1976 and 1977, was done on the newly re-opened West Somerset Railway, using its engines and other rolling stock.

== The locomotive ==
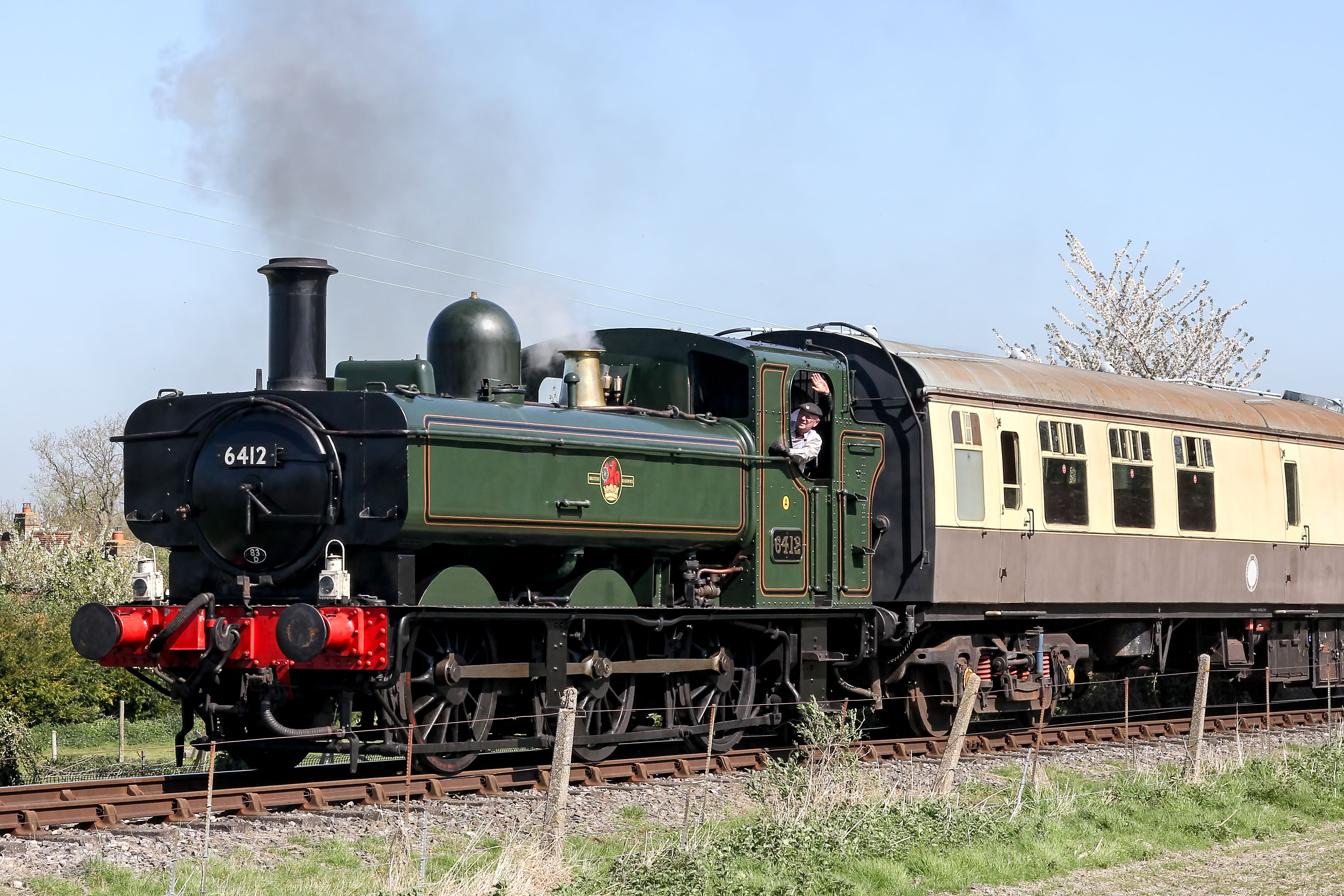
6412 in 2017

The star of the show was the steam locomotive that gave the series its name. Flockton Flyer was, in reality, an ex-Great Western Railway 0-6-0PT (pannier tank), 6400 Class no. 6412, built in 1934. This class was fitted with equipment for working push–pull trains. No. 6412 was once based at Gloucester loco shed and, aside from its many years of reliable operation on local branch lines, operated the last passenger train to Monmouth over the Wye Valley Railway in 1959, and the final Chalford Shuttle autotrain service between Gloucester and Chalford in 1962.

After being sold into private ownership for preservation, this locomotive was one of the first on the West Somerset Railway, arriving in 1976, and taking part in the opening ceremony a few days later. It was found useful for the lighter-loaded trains on the Minehead Branch line; it also visited some other preserved railways.

Owned by the West Somerset Railway Association, No. 6412 remained on the heritage railway for 32 years. During that time, the success of the railway led to the use of longer and heavier trains – beyond the capability of a pannier tank – so Association members decided, reluctantly, to sell it. On 8 January 2009, part-dismantled for a major overhaul, 6412 was transferred by road to the South Devon Railway, the new owners, where it still resided until 2025. It is now owned by West Somerset Railway.

The on-screen title for series 1 was The Flockton Flyer, but for series 2 it had become Flockton Flyer because railway enthusiasts had pointed out that locomotive names do not take "the" before them (e.g. Mallard and Flying Scotsman, not The Mallard and The Flying Scotsman).

== Episodes (from film and novel) ==
Script writer Peter Whitbread wrote a total of 17 episodes, of which 12 were filmed (6 in series one, and 6 in series two). Whitbread, who died following a road traffic accident in 2004, is best remembered as a scriptwriter, though he also acted and directed; he was not a novelist. The publication in the summer of 1977 of a Flockton Flyer children's novel appears to have been merely the adaptation of 6 storylines intended for filming, (Note: This assumption is made by Alistair McGowan and Nick Jones in "Flockton Flyer Viewing Notes", published 2009 by Simply Home Entertainment, serial 131410.) including a script with all the hallmarks of a Christmas Special edition. The novel was published by Arrow Books and Look-in Books, the latter being a trading name of a subsidiary of ITV. The novel's first and second chapters were essentially the script of filmed episode 1.1, while the seventh and final chapter was the script of episode 1.6; however, the other four chapters (numbered 3, 4, 5, and 6) were self-contained storylines which could have formed the basis of additional filmed episodes, but were never actually recorded. The total of 17 episodes written includes the 12 filmed, the additional 4 from the novel, and one other episode which was written in detail, with scripts and production notes issued to cast and crew, but subsequently abandoned; see below (episode 2.X) for details.

=== Series 1 (1977) ===
No.	Episode Name	Broadcast Date	Plot Overview
Series One
1.1	Be It Ever So Humble	1977-04-18	The Carter family are introduced. They are evicted from their home and work, where they ran a petrol station, as tenants. Bob Carter (the father) is a volunteer in the local railway preservation society and agrees that he and his family will undertake the running of the restored line, in return for taking up residence in Flockton station. Bill Jelly is introduced as a local tramp, living in a nearby platelayers' lineside hut. The railway's 4-wheeled open freight truck is used to transport the Carter family's possessions to Flockton.
1.2	Game Set and Match	1977-04-25	Disaster is narrowly averted when the Flockton Flyer steams towards a tree deliberately felled across the line. In attempting to move it, Bob Carter is injured. A nearby farmer rescues him, but also says he did it as a protest, fearing that a restored train service will threaten his cattle, wandering down his track, which crosses the railway line between his fields, in search of water during the drought. The railway's 4-wheeled water tank truck is used to bring gallons of water to the thirsty cattle, and relations are restored.
1.3	Pull the Other One	1977-05-02	Ghosts appear to be haunting both Flockton station and Jelly's hut. At Flockton the ghosts turn out to be tearaway teenage vandal Don Davis. Having been caught, he is befriended, and becomes a volunteer on the railway. The ghosts at Jelly's hut appear real, however, and a local vicar is called upon to perform an exorcism (the camera remains outside the hut during the 15-minute ceremony, owing to 1970's ITV regulations on children's programming). This clergyman also runs a hostel for homeless boys, a hostel of which Don Davis is a resident; this leads the Carters to put him up for a few days in their home as they befriend him.
1.4	Under the Circumstances	1977-05-09	The excitement on the railway is the reinstatement of the telegraph system, allowing communication between the various stations, signal boxes, and the Carters' home. The system is immediately used by Commander Frost to notify the Carters of a traffic accident – there has been a pile-up on one of the railway's level crossings. The Flockton Flyer returns to Flockton to collect medical supplies, blankets, the family, and the railway's 4-wheeled box van, which is to serve as a makeshift ambulance. Meanwhile, elder daughter Jan, out marking the route of the new nature trail, stumbles upon an injured woman, and having taken her to shelter spends the rest of the episode fruitlessly dashing back and forth attempting to get help – her failure largely due to everyone dealing with the other, more serious emergency. Meanwhile, the lady in question is rescued by Bill Jelly. By 1970s standards it is high drama when a somewhat primitive motor ambulance (with two-tone horns blaring) is seen speeding down a station platform to rendezvous with the Flockton Flyer and remove casualties. Finally the injured lady is identified as a well-known writer and archaeologist, and she agrees to officially open the new nature trail. The exhausted Jan receives no thanks for her efforts, but is criticised for having failed to produce the promised assistance.
1.5	Oo Do You Suppose Will Get the Medal?	1977-05-16	The Bristol Mail has been held up at gunpoint on the mainline, and as the police will take a long time to arrive, the train has been diverted onto the Flockton branch. The episode involves much furious use of the hand-pumped inspection truck by Jelly and the Commander, and a much larger than usual additional cast. These additional roles include not only the three robbers, and the driver of the Bristol Mail, but also a troop of mounted police who have a rousing gallop scene set to classical music (Vaughan Williams' Overture to the Wasps) as they ride into the final scenes to save the day. They find the robbers already thwarted by the Carter family, Bill Jelly, and the Commander. The police are said to have come from "Nutley", which is actually the name of the series producer, Colin Nutley. Some scenes were filmed in Dunster, including views of Dunster Castle.
1.6	I Name This Ship	1977-05-23	The grand opening of the restored Flockton to Lane End Railway. The storyline revolves around two features – firstly, the frantic preparations at Flockton for the grand opening, including the provision of refreshments and the arrival of a brass band with an overly nervous conductor in charge – secondly, the desire of Commander Frost to drive the engine (for which he is not qualified), which proves an uncontrollable desire. Having intended to drive the engine along the platform, the Commander finds himself unable to stop the locomotive and moving at speed down the line; ultimately his progress is stopped by Jan and Bill when they arrange a controlled collision to stop the engine. Bill and some railway volunteers arrive on the hand-pumped cart, but a passing quartet of shire horses are needed to pull the Flockton Flyer free of the debris. In the single most serious continuity error of the entire series, during the attempts to recover the crashed locomotive, the action returns briefly to Flockton Station, where there is a general panic about the whereabouts of the locomotive – unfortunately the engine, complete with its Flockton Flyer headboard, is clearly visible standing at the platform edge behind the characters. Finally the engine is named by Frost's wife, and the band plays Sir Edward Elgar's triumphant Land of Hope and Glory as the first public train pulls away from the station.

=== Series 2 (1978) ===
No.	Episode Name	Broadcast Date	Plot Overview
Series Two
2.1	Race You For It	1978-01-09	The 17th Duke of Flockton has died, and his son (now the 18th Duke) reclaims the 4 miles of track previously on loan from his father. This leaves the Society with 8 miles of track in two 4-mile sections, with a big gap in the middle. Bill Jelly proposes the solution – a bet, based on a race between the Flockton Flyer and the Duke's locomotive Vulcan. (Note: W G Bagnall 0-6-0 saddle tank No. 2994 Vulcan. Photo from 1980.) Vulcan, a more powerful machine, is set to win, until the arrogant Duke celebrates too soon and accidentally hits the regulator shut, allowing the Flockton Flyer to cross the finish line first. Harry Lee, the actual West Somerset Railway driver used in filming, had an acting role in this episode as the Duke's engine driver. In other series-wide plotlines, the Carters have moved from Flockton to a smaller station down the line, as the main station is now required by fare-paying passengers. The mother, Kathy, is absent owing to two months of study in Canada for her Open University degree (in reality, actress Sheila Fearn could not be spared from filming for George and Mildred). Bill Jelly has also moved from his platelayers' hut into a disused passenger coach at the platform of the Carters' new station-home.
2.2	Ready When You Are, Mr Cutley	1978-01-16	The title is a deliberate play on the name of Colin Nutley, series producer (series 1 and 2) and director (series 2). With noticeably less railway activity than previous episodes, the plotline revolves around the visit of a film crew to make a historical re-enactment of the Indian Mutiny. If the rolling hills of Somerset are a far-fetched India, the Great Western Railway pannier tank bears little resemblance to any Indian Railways locomotive, although some cosmetic touches were employed, including the fitting of an Indian-style cowcatcher to the front buffer beam, a star emblem to the front of the smoke-box door, and temporary nameplates, renaming the Flockton Flyer as the Star of India. In the two main strands of action, Jan Carter falls in love with dashing young actor Christopher Bell, playing Captain Ponsonby (and in reality played by actor John Moulder-Brown), while Bill Jelly (who has a small part as an Indian prince) saves the day when funding runs out, by securing £200,000 from an Arab Sheikh who owes him a favour – a story that nobody will believe until first the money, and then the Sheikh himself, arrive on set. Bob Carter reveals in the dialogue that the railway's facility fee will help open a further 10 miles of the old line, which would take the total length to 24 miles; in reality, the West Somerset Railway was hoping to achieve just such an end through the facility fee from allowing filming of The Flockton Flyer, and their total railway length is now 23 miles, although there are no regular services over the extra mile or so connection to Network Rail tracks to Taunton. In a comical sub-plot, Commander Frost returns from a holiday in Folkestone unaware of the filming contract and repeatedly stumbles into shot, accidentally spoiling shooting; his hints that he might make a good further extra (as a senior British officer) are ignored. The actors rode on a bogie flat truck. This episode was originally intended to be 2.3, but was swapped with 2.2 when the original 2.2 was abandoned and totally re-written (see 2.X below).
2.3	What a Little Beauty	1978-01-23	The seventeenth and last episode to be written: plans for series 2 were complete when the original 2.2 was dropped (see 2.X below), episode 2.3 became 2.2, and a new 2.3 was written. Commander Frost is finally undertaking training as a steam engine driver, but his ability is limited. His wife Althea joins him on the footplate of the Flockton Flyer in the opening scenes, but Bob Carter is forced to take over when Frost cannot manage even a simple braking manoeuvre. The action takes place away from the railway preservation society's tracks, on the abandoned Nettlecombe branch line. "Should we be here?" asks Mrs Frost. Carter replies that the line is unused, although he has heard a rumour that it may have been privately purchased. Almost at once, another locomotive is discovered sitting in a nearby platform. Frost states "What a little cracker", to which Carter adds "What a little beauty" – giving the episode its title. The owner turns out to be a Chief Petty Officer (retired) who served on the same ship as Commander Frost. CPO Potts has unwittingly become involved in cattle rustling, and the Flockton Flyer (with 4-wheeled box van) is used to return all the cows to their rightful owners. Frost also gets extra steam engine driving lessons on the Little Beauty, which is an 0-4-0 Peckett saddle tank engine, real name Whitehead.
2.4	A Question of Honour	1978-01-30	In a simple storyline, the Flockton Flyer (operating the society's regular passenger service) encounters the local hunt, and a row ensues between Bob Carter and the Master of Foxhounds. Bob's bad mood later leads to his falling out with his children and Bill Jelly – the latter immediately packing his bags to move away. The girls seek the intervention of Commander Frost, but he is similarly preoccupied with a war against sparrows in his garden. For the men it is a "matter of honour", but for the women it is mysterious behaviour. Eventually a letter arrives from Kathy Carter in Canada, and a much-relieved Bob is able to apologise to Bill Jelly. Meanwhile, an accident leaves the hunt far from any road with an injured horse, and only the Flockton Flyer (with a 4-wheeled box van) can assist, by transporting the injured horse and the vet. There follows a general reconciliation of all parties, and a mutual admission of hot-headedness.
2.5	'Op It	1978-02-06	Everyone is very busy. Bob and the volunteers have freight deliveries up and down the railway; Jimmy has passed his driving test, and he and Jan are buying a van to establish a removals firm; Bill is preparing for, and then attending, his British Legion reunion dinner; Jack and Althea also have a full diary, although Jack and Jessica meet briefly at the docks. Meanwhile, Jessica, with nothing to do, and nobody to socialise with, meets a young man cleaning his father's boat and hatches a plan. The following morning she stows away on the train, then walks to the docks, and persuades the young man and his father to sail her over to a nearby island which has been a cause of much interest to her. She is subsequently found to be missing and a huge, but fruitless, search ensues. Finally Jack remembers his conversation with Jessica about the island, and Bill recalls a similar discussion; Jack secures a boat and the whole party sails over to the island where the missing Jessica is rediscovered.
2.6	A Little Bit of Somewhere	1978-02-13	In the series finale of what turned out to be the final series, Bob Carter makes an emergency stop with a service train loaded with passengers, owing to a mother and her two children walking on the railway line. The mother tells them she is with a group of travelling gypsies. The group is being moved on from the field in which it is camped, and Bob tries to get permission for them to stay in a field near the Carters' house, owned by the railway. However, the committee refuse, although, encouraged by Bill, they simply move in anyway, and Bob, whose wife remains away in Canada, studying, enjoys the company of Sylvia. Meanwhile, Jimmy's very first load of furniture for his new removals company is stolen during the night, but the gypsies successfully recover it. Finally, Bob discovers another abandoned branch line, owned by the railway society, which has a large field, and gets the committee's agreement for the gypsies to use it.

=== Unfilmed episodes ===
No.	Episode Name	Broadcast Date	Plot Overview
Unfilmed or Abandoned Episodes
2.X	(No title)	(Not made)	In August 1977 cast and crew received initial filming instructions for an episode that was never made. The extant notes reveal that the episode involved a storyline based around the coast, and a stretch of the railway running beside the sea. The plot revolved around Commander Jack Frost and his wife Althea (who had appeared in episode 1.6), and also involved all of the Carters, and a character named Chalky White (who was to be played by a guest actor, but was never cast). Ten scenes were listed to be filmed at Watchet Docks. Props listed included two boats (one the property of Chalky White), a heavy chain, a bicycle, and the Flockton Flyer. The finale of the episode involved an Air Sea Rescue helicopter, and would have been the most ambitious episode yet. However, before filming commenced, the entire episode was abandoned, probably due to the production team failing to secure the use of a helicopter. (Note: See pages 12–13 of "Flockton Flyer Viewing Notes", published 2009 by Simply Home Entertainment, serial 131410.) Originally intended to be episode 2.2, it was replaced in the line-up by the original 2.3, while a brand new episode 2.3 was hastily written, entitled "What a Little Beauty".
Ch.3	The Show Must Go On!	(Not made)	It is Hallowe'en night, and there is an appropriately ghostly fog. Three actors with Arts Council funding become lost, and are rescued by the Flockton Flyer. This episode was published in the 1977 paperback novel, but (unlike preceding chapters 1 and 2, which together formed episode 1.1) was never filmed.
Ch.4	Christmas Special	(Not made)	Commander Frost and Bill Jelly fight over the role of Santa Claus, in a storyline about a train service taking children to visit Father Christmas. The title has a double meaning, as special can refer to an extra train service or to an extra seasonal episode of a television series. Published in book form, the episode was never filmed.
Ch.5	Anchors Aweigh!	(Not made)	In the most overtly political episode, Welsh nationalist protesters, staging an anti-English campaign, resort to kidnap, and Commander Frost is obliged to save the day. There is much maritime activity. Published in book form, this episode was never filmed.
Ch.6	Circus Side-show	(Not made)	Jan Carter takes centre stage in this episode, falling in love with a young boy from a travelling German circus. There can be no long-term relationship between the English girl and the German boy, and in any case disaster strikes when the circus catches fire; the railway comes to the rescue, and the Flockton Flyer becomes a railway fire engine. Unlike the following chapter 7, which was filmed as episode 1.6, this chapter 6 was published only in book form, and was never filmed.

== Characters ==
=== Regular cast ===
- Bob Carter – David Neal
- Kathy Carter – Sheila Fearn (series 1 only)
- Commander Jack Frost – Anthony Sharp
- Jimmy Carter – Peter Duncan
- Jan Carter – Gwyneth Strong
- Jessica Carter – Annabelle Lanyon (series 1); Catrin Strong (series 2)
- Bill Jelly – Geoffrey Russell
- Althea Frost – Margaret Wedlake

=== Guest appearances ===
- 1.1 Ted Phillips (Denis Gilmore)
- 1.2 Joe Pratt (John Barrett)
- 1.3 Don Davis (Phil Daniels); Reverend Walker (Stacy Davies)
- 1.4 Samantha Peters (Peggy Ann Clifford as Peggyann Clifford)
- 1.5 Toff (Michael Ripper); Eric (Ben Howard); Diesel Driver (Steve Kelly)
- 1.6 Mr Jenkins (Dudley Jones)
- 2.1 The Duke of Flockton (Patrick Mower)
- 2.2 Christopher Bell (John Moulder-Brown); Nolan Cutley (Harry Fowler); Felicity (Penny Irving)
- 2.3 C.P.O. Potts (Colin Douglas); Farmer (Thomas Heathcote)
- 2.4 Master of Foxhounds (Gerald Harper); Vet (Edward Underdown)
- 2.5 Young Man (Christoper Douglas)
- 2.6 Sylvia (Illona Linthwaite)

== Production notes ==
- Written by: – Peter Whitbread
- Theme Music: – Jugg Music
- Film Camera: – Joe Hardy and Peter Greenhalgh (series 1); Roy Page (series 2)
- Film Sound: – Stan Phipps
- Dubbing Mixer: – Ron Hussey
- Film Editor: – Christopher Wentzell (series 1); Michael Hunt (series 2)
- Design: – John Dilly (series 1); Gregory Lawson (series 2)
- Executive Producer: – Lewis Rudd
- Producer (series 1) and Producer/Director (series 2): – Colin Nutley

== DVD release ==
The rights to The Flockton Flyer are now held by Renown Pictures Ltd, who also hold the rights to several other Southern TV productions, including Worzel Gummidge, Freewheelers and The Famous Five.

The series was cleared for DVD release in the UK (by Simply Home Entertainment) in early 2009, and pre-orders of the two-DVD set, containing the complete Series One and Series Two, arrived with customers on the release date, 16 March 2009.
