= Great Expectations (1974 film) =

1974 US/UK drama film by Joseph Hardy

- Directed by: Joseph Hardy
- Screenplay by: Sherman Yellen
- Based on: Great Expectations; 1861 novel by Charles Dickens
- Produced by: Robert Fryer
- Starring: Michael York; Sarah Miles; James Mason; Robert Morley; Margaret Leighton; Anthony Quayle; Rachel Roberts; Joss Ackland
- Cinematography: Freddie Young
- Music by: Maurice Jarre
- Production companies: Transcontinental Film Productions, ITC
- Release date: November 22, 1974
- Running time: 124 minutes
- Countries: United States; United Kingdom
- Languages: English and Germanic

Great Expectations is a 1974 film made for television based on the Charles Dickens 1861 novel of the same name. It was directed by Joseph Hardy, with screenwriter Sherman Yellen and music by Maurice Jarre, starring Michael York as Pip, Simon Gipps-Kent as Young Pip and Sarah Miles as Estella. The production, for Transcontinental Films and ITC, was made for US television and released to cinemas in the UK. It broke with tradition by having the same actress (the thirty-three-year-old Sarah Miles) play both the younger and older Estella. The film was shot by Freddie Young. It was filmed in Eastmancolor and it was entered into the 9th Moscow International Film Festival in 1975.

== Cast ==
- Michael York as Pip
- Sarah Miles as Estella
- James Mason as Abel Magwitch
- Margaret Leighton as Miss Havisham
- Robert Morley as Uncle Pumblechook
- Anthony Quayle as Jaggers
- Joss Ackland as Joe Gargery
- Rachel Roberts as Mrs. Gargery
- Andrew Ray as Herbert Pocket
- Heather Sears as Biddy
- Simon Gipps-Kent as Young Pip
- James Faulkner as Bentley Drummle
- Peter Bull as Wemmick
- John Clive as Mr. Wopsle
- Patsy Smart as Mrs. Wopsle
- Maria Charles as Sarah Pocket

== Production and reception ==
CinemaTV Today reported in 1974, however, that "in an unprecedented move, the bulk of the score for Sir Lew Grade and NBC's musical version of Great Expectations has been scrapped seven weeks into shooting". Films Illustrated reported that the film would contain "only a traditional score by Maurice Jarre" after the idea of a film musical version had been dropped. In 1995, Michael York said "we found when we started putting it together [that] the songs interrupted the narrative flow of the piece".

Critics' comments were generally negative. The Listener: "Everything is wrong about it with a sort of dedicated, inspired wrongness that, in itself, is breath-taking". The Monthly Film Bulletin thought director Hardy and screenwriter Yellen had reduced "one of Dickens' most subtle and complex novels to an insipid seasonal confection". Gordon Gow, writing in Films and Filming thought it odd to have "Pip divided between two players, [while] his beloved Estella should be played by one actress the whole way through".

Brian McFarlane, writing in a 2008 study of screen adaptations of Great Expectations, criticised the film for its tendency to give way to "clichés of sentimentality" and assured the director, who had expressed a hope that people would not feel the necessity of comparing it with David Lean's version that, "he need not have worried: no one would have spoken of them in the same breath. It's not just Lean's film with which it would not stand comparison but with several superior TV mini-series too". McFarlane expressed some admiration however for Margaret Leighton's interpretation of the jilted Miss Havisham: "there is a potent sense of the perverse pleasure she takes in watching Estella humiliate Pip, and, during a later visit, of real cruelty in her telling him, 'You've lost her'. Leighton injected 'a necessary bitterness into these scenes'". The critic David Parker, writing for the BFI Screenonline website, praised Joss Ackland's interpretation of Joe Gargery: "Ackland manages to create a subtle blend of individual simplicity and moral fortitude that seems to capture the essential role the village blacksmith fills in the narrative."
