= Simon Gipps-Kent =

English actor (1958–1987)

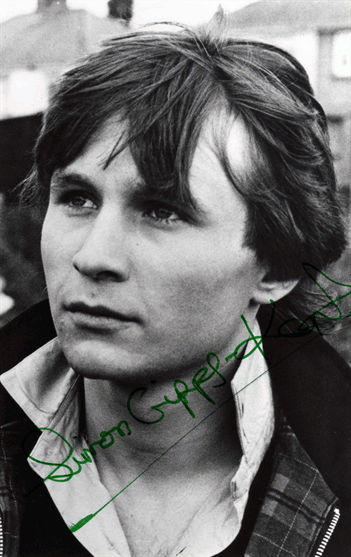
- Gipps-Kent in 1979
- Born: Simon Trevor Kent; 25 October 1958; London, England
- Died: 16 September 1987 (aged 28); London, England
- Cause of death: Misadventure (morphine poisoning)
- Resting place: Cremains scattered at Golders Green Crematorium
- Education: London Oratory School; Cardinal Manning Roman Catholic Boys' School
- Occupations: Stage, film, television actor
- Years active: 1971–1986
- Notable work: Lost Hearts; The Tomorrow People; Great Expectations; The Devil's Crown; Doctor Who; To Serve Them All My Days
- Height: 5 ft 7 in (1.70 m)

Simon Gipps-Kent (born Simon Trevor Kent; 25 October 1958 – 16 September 1987) was an English theatre and film actor in the 1970s and 1980s, known for his teenage portrayals of British royalty and nobility. He was born into a show business family in Kensington, London. His television debut was on the BBC in 1971 followed with a London West End theatre debut in 1972. He continued to act on stage, film and television until the year before his death in 1987.

== Early life and education ==
Simon Trevor Kent was born in London to Peter Gipps Kent, a variety artist, and Sonia (née Aebersold) Kent, a dancer. At age 12 he decided acting would be his career. As a youth he attended the Ladbroke Grove School in west London where he wrote, produced, directed and acted in his own play as a way of gaining recognition. Brought up as a Catholic, he attended the London Oratory School in Brompton from September 1970 to June 1974, moving to Cardinal Manning Roman Catholic Boys' School, also in London.

== Theatre ==
Simon Gipps-Kent, as he would later call himself, had early experience on the British stage that, according to his talent agency listings, included alternately playing one of the royal children (either Prince Bertie or Prince Alfie) in I and Albert at the Piccadilly Theatre in 1972–73, and as Max-Ernst von Kellig in A Lesson in Blood and Roses, starring with Ben Kingsley at the Royal Shakespeare Company in 1973. He appeared in the production Fantastic Fairground at the Young Vic in 1974, and a Young Vic tour of Macbeth, playing Fleance, in Mexico and Spain in 1975. Gipps-Kent played "Emmanuel" to Herbert Lom's Napoleon Bonaparte in William Douglas-Home's Betzi at the Haymarket Theatre and on a regional tour in 1975. In 1976–77 he appeared in Where the Rainbow Ends at the Gardner Theatre, Brighton.

In a 1979 newspaper interview titled Simon's Problem is Time, Gipps-Kent expressed his wish to move on to adult roles, including more Shakespeare, but in spite of his accumulated credentials to date, he had been denied those opportunities. Due to his "boyish good looks and modest figure", he found himself playing younger characters than his real age, mostly on British television, for the majority of his career.

Gipps-Kent later returned to London theatre work in the 1981 run of Romulus Linney's Childe Byron at the Young Vic with David Essex as Lord Byron. For five months in 1983 he appeared in the London Shakespeare Group's productions of Betrayal and Twelfth Night, which also played a short season at the Donmar Warehouse and toured extensively for the British Council in China, Japan and throughout the Far East, Middle East and Africa.

Gipps-Kent appeared at Wyndham's Theatre and on a regional tour in Sue Townsend's The Secret Diary of Adrian Mole, Aged 13¾ from 1984 to 1986 as the character "Barry Kent".

== Television and films ==
His first television appearance was at age 13 in Philip Saville's 1971 O Fat White Woman for the BBC's Play for Today, in a story by William Trevor of a teacher who takes pleasure in abusing his students. He returned to Play for Today in 1974 in After the Solo. He appeared as the bookworm orphan Peter Beresford in the 1972–73 BBC adaptation of Noel Streatfeild's 1970 children's book Thursday's Child. At age 15 he headlined as the preteen orphan Stephen in the BBC television adaptation of M. R. James's Lost Hearts, first broadcast on Christmas Day 1973, as part of the A Ghost Story for Christmas series and now preserved in the British Film Institute (BFI) collection.

In 1974 Gipps-Kent appeared in "The Doomsday Men" episodes of the children's science fiction television series The Tomorrow People, and played young Pip (to Michael York's adult Pip) in a made-for-TV retelling of the Charles Dickens novel Great Expectations for the Bell System Family Theatre, airing in the United States on 22 November 1974.

In 1974, in a film for the then Children's Film Foundation, he starred in The Firefighters as a "junior firefighter" accused of arson who must, with the aid of his younger brother and sister, prove his innocence and find the real arsonists before his court appearance. That production and the entire CFF archive are now curated by the BFI. Also in 1975, he appeared in Edward the Seventh, again portraying young Prince Edward ("Bertie"), this time for ITV. For a time he also played Kenton Archer in the BBC radio serial The Archers.

In 1976 Gipps-Kent appeared on British television starring in Westway made by HTV for ITV. He starred in A Traveller in Time (1978), a BBC series based on the children's book by Alison Uttley about the Babington Plot, and in "V for Victory", an episode of the TV series Enemy at the Door. Also in 1978, he was featured in episodes of The Devil's Crown as Arthur I, Duke of Brittany, and played the part of "Willie" in Peter McDougall's supernatural drama Tarry-Dan Tarry-Dan Scarey Old Spooky Man, both for the BBC. Gipps-Kent had the uncredited speaking part of a posh party boy in Quadrophenia (1979), based loosely on the 1973 rock opera of the same name by The Who, and appeared in the Doctor Who story The Horns of Nimon.

Gipps-Kent headlined in two Southern Television serials based on books written by British children's authors; Midnight is a Place (1977), by Joan Aiken, and Noah's Castle (1980), by John Rowe Townsend. As "Chad Boyer", he reunited with Devil's Crown actor John Duttine in his BBC series To Serve Them All My Days (1980), based on the R. F. Delderfield novel. Also in 1980, his appearance in Jill Gascoine's ITV series The Gentle Touch paired him with soon-to-be pop star Limahl.

Gipps-Kent was "Rudkin the Messenger" in the pilot episode for the Rowan Atkinson comedy series The Black Adder in 1982. That same year Gipps-Kent guest-starred in a series 4 episode of the popular British children's programme Metal Mickey. He was a series regular on Eureka in the 80s, playing numerous historic and fictional characters, such as J.P. Knight, with other series regulars like Sylvester McCoy.

== Death ==
Simon Gipps-Kent died in his flat on Cavendish Road in the London Borough of Brent on 16 September 1987, aged 28. His funeral was held on 28 September at the Golders Green Crematorium. His body was cremated there and his ashes were later scattered on the Crocus Lawn, Section 3H.

A coroner's inquest held on 14 January 1988 ruled his death as misadventure caused by morphine poisoning, the death certificate being registered the following day.

== Selected filmography ==
Year	Title	Role	Notes
1973	Lost Hearts	Stephen	
1974	The Tomorrow People	Paul	4 episodes: The Doomsday Men
1974	Great Expectations	Young Pip	TV movie
1975	Edward the Seventh	Younger Bertie	Miniseries
1977	Enemy at the Door	Billy le Prevost	Episode: V' For Victory
1978	The Devil's Crown	Arthur	Miniseries
1979	Quadrophenia	Boy at Party	Uncredited
1979–1980	Doctor Who	Seth	4 episodes: The Horns of Nimon
1980	To Serve Them All My Days	Chad Boyer	Miniseries
1982	Blackadder	Rudkin	Original Pilot
