= Thursday's Child (TV series) =

British television series

Thursday's Child is a British television series adaptation of Noel Streatfeild's 1970 children's historical novel of the same name. Consisting of six episodes, the series aired on BBC One between 27 December 1972 and 31 January 1973. The series stars Claire Walker as Margaret Thursday, Gillian Bailey as Lavinia Beresford, Simon Gipps-Kent as Peter Beresford, David Tully as Horatio Beresford, Caroline Harris as Miss Snelston, Althea Parker as Matron, Kit Daniels as Jem, Maxine Kalli as Susan, Anne Pichon as Miss Jones, Jill Riddick as Clara, Cindy O'Callaghan as Winifred, Edwin Brown as Filbert, Susan Field as Ma Smith, Joy Harington as Mrs. Tanner, Anne Ridler as Lady Corkberry, Peter Williams as Lord Corkberry, Will Stampe as Captain Smith, and Arthur Blake as PC Perkins. The series was entered into the 1973 Monte-Carlo Television Festival; placing third in the children's television program category.
