= Gillian Bailey =

British actress

- Born: 14 June 1955 (age 71); Wimbledon, London, England
- Education: Kingston University
- Occupations: Actress, professor

Gillian Bailey (born 14 June 1955 in Wimbledon, London), also known as Gilli Bush-Bailey, is a British actress and professor.

She was a child actress and appeared as Billie in Here Come the Double Deckers! (1970–71). Other roles included Phyllis in a television version of The Railway Children (1968), Laurine in Bel Ami (1971), Janey in The Witch's Daughter (1971), Lavinia in Thursday's Child (1972–73) and Callie in Follyfoot (1971–73).

As an adult actress she played Jinny Carter in series 1 of Poldark (1975), Ravella in the first episode of Blake's 7 "The Way Back" (1978), Julie Dunn in the series ‘Together’ (1980), Maureen Galbraith in the BBC TV series County Hall (1982) and Olive Calvert in Strangers and Brothers (1984). In the 1990s she found that work dried up and began working as a script reader.

In 1992, she returned to complete her education at Kingston University.

After a period at the Drama and Theatre department at the Royal Holloway, University of London she is now Professor of Women's Performance Histories at the Royal Central School of Speech and Drama in London.

== Family ==
Bailey married Richard Everett in 1974, and the couple have a daughter.
