= List of fictional railway stations =

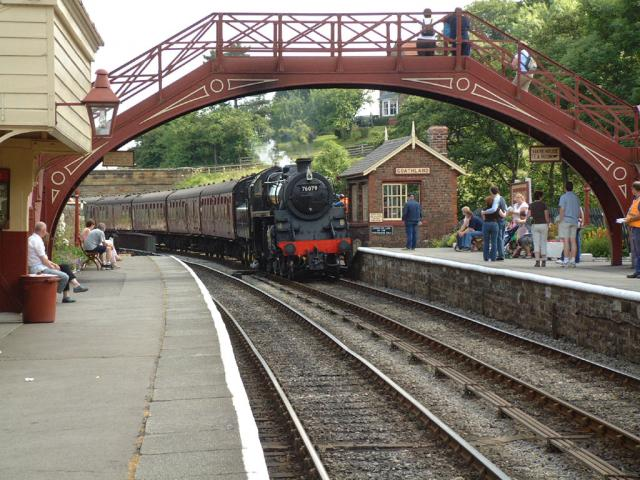
Goathland station has been used as the location for several fictional stations including Aidensfield (Heartbeat), Hogsmeade (Harry Potter) and Mannerton (All Creatures Great and Small).

This is a list of fictional railway stations (as opposed to genuine railway stations portrayed in fictional works or context).

== Branch line ==
=== England ===
==== Berkshire ====
- Cemetery Junction - Cemetery Junction

==== Borsetshire ====
- Downham – The Archers
- Upper Croft – The Archers

==== Buckinghamshire ====
- Hambleden – Candleshoe

==== Cheshire ====
- Hanbury Halt – Cranford

==== Cornwall ====
- Fal Vale Junction – The Ghost Train

==== Devon ====
- Grimpen – The Hound of the Baskervilles

==== Dorset ====
- Chufnell Regis – Jeeves and Wooster
- Pepperinge Eye – Bedknobs and Broomsticks

==== Hampshire ====
- Hamingwell Halt – The Great St Trinian's Train Robbery

==== Lake District ====
- Rio – Swallows and Amazons
- Strickland Junction – Swallows and Amazons

==== Lancashire ====
- Ormston – Born and Bred

==== Midsomer ====
- Holm Lane Junction — Midsomer Murders episode "Death in a Chocolate Box"

==== Norfolk ====
- Arcady – Love on a Branch Line
- Arcady Halt – Love on a Branch Line
- Flaxfield – Love on a Branch Line

==== Somerset ====
- Combe Florey Halt – The Flockton Flyer
- Flockton – The Flockton Flyer
- Lane End – The Flockton Flyer
- Marlbury – To the Manor Born
- Nettlecombe – The Flockton Flyer
- Titfield – The Titfield Thunderbolt

==== Sussex ====
- Beershorn – Cold Comfort Farm
- Beershorn Halt – Cold Comfort Farm (film)
- Godmere – Cold Comfort Farm

==== Yorkshire ====
- Aidensfield – Heartbeat
- Ailsenby – The Royal
- Elsinby – The Royal
- Ledby – Heartbeat
- Mortonhurst – The Railway Children (2000)
- Skellerton – Sam
- Stacklepoole Junction – The Railway Children
- Workdale – What a Carve Up!

==== Worcestershire ====
- Austen-in-the-Wold – Oh, Doctor Beeching!
- Bigglesby – Oh, Doctor Beeching!
- Buston – Oh, Doctor Beeching!
- Cogglethorpe – Oh, Doctor Beeching!
- Coldhorton – Oh, Doctor Beeching!
- Hatley – Oh, Doctor Beeching!
- Little Weirwold – Goodnight Mister Tom
- Loxley – Oh, Doctor Beeching!
- Nether Padley – Oh, Doctor Beeching!
- Nossington Bassett – Oh, Doctor Beeching!
- Swinthorpe – Oh, Doctor Beeching!
- Wenstead – Oh, Doctor Beeching!
- Wetherton – Oh, Doctor Beeching!

==== Unknown ====
- Bufflers Halt – The Secret Service
- Crythin Gifford – The Woman in Black

=== Scotland ===
- Auchenshoogle – Oor Wullie
- Clachan of Inverstarve – The Glenmutchkin Railway
- Glenbogle – Monarch of the Glen
- Glenmutchkin – The Glenmutchkin Railway

=== Wales ===
- Grumbly – Ivor the Engine
- Llangubbin – Ivor the Engine
- Llaniog – Ivor the Engine
- Llanmad – Ivor the Engine
- Llantisilly – Ivor the Engine
- Tan-y-Gwlch – Ivor the Engine

=== Northern Ireland ===
- Buggleskelly – Oh, Mr. Porter!

=== Poland ===
- Bölkau – How I Unleashed World War II
- Baumburg – How I Unleashed World War II
- Brzozkowo – How I Unleashed World War II
- Chandra Unyńska – Piotr Płaksin and Darmozjad polski
- Kamieniec – Wkrótce nadejdą bracia
- Maritimska – O psie, który jeździł koleją
- Ustjanowa – Droga

=== United States ===
- Fish's Switch – Speak Easily
- Hooterville – Petticoat Junction
- Pixley – Petticoat Junction

== Main line ==
=== England ===
==== Holby ====
- Holby Central – Casualty
- Holby West – Casualty
- Farmead Market – Casualty
- Stokeville – Casualty

==== Barsetshire ====
- Barchester – The Black Sheep of Whitehall

==== Borsetshire ====
- Felpersham – The Archers
- Hollerton Junction – The Archers

==== Greater London ====
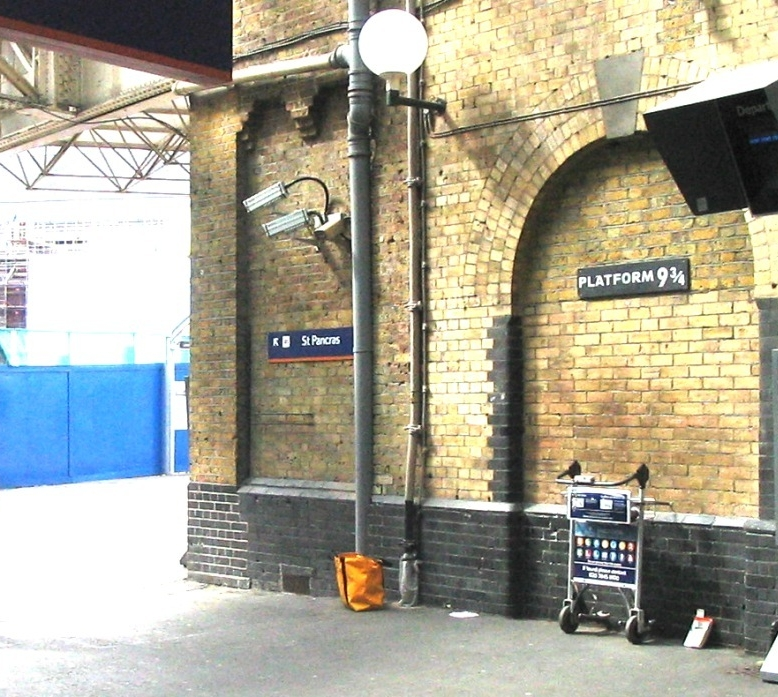
Platform 9 3/4 at King's Cross railway station (Harry Potter)

- Buckingham Palace – Churchill: The Hollywood Years
- King's Cross railway station Platform 9 3/4 — Harry Potter films
- Walford East – EastEnders
- Charnham – Family Affairs

==== Hampshire ====
- Fordbridge – The Great St Trinian's Train Robbery
- Hamingwell – The Great St Trinian's Train Robbery
- Nutcombe – The Great St Trinian's Train Robbery
- Pudham – The Great St Trinian's Train Robbery

==== Kent ====
- Eastgate – Dad's Army
- Snettlefold – Dad's Army
- Walmington-on-Sea – Dad's Army

==== Lincolnshire ====
- Cablethorpe – Hi-de-Hi!
- Crimpton-on-Sea – Hi-de-Hi!
- Moulton Junction – Hi-de-Hi!

==== Norfolk ====
- Eastbeach – The Iron Way by C.M. Hincks (London: Nisbet & Co. Ltd, 1920)
- Eastwich – The Iron Way
- Marford Junction – The Iron Way
- Southmouth – The Iron Way
- Tranbridge Junction – The Iron Way

==== Somerset ====
- Mallingford – The Titfield Thunderbolt

==== Trumptonshire ====
- Trumpton – Trumpton
- Wintlebury – Chigley

==== Tyne and Wear ====
- Gallowshield – When the Boat Comes In

==== Yorkshire ====
- Bramall – The New Statesman
- Downton – Downton Abbey
- Kingsport – South Riding
- Kiplington – South Riding
- Skerrow – South Riding

==== Worcestershire ====
- Clumberfield – Oh, Doctor Beeching!

==== Unknown ====
- Barwell Heath – 4:50 from Paddington
- Brackhampton – 4:50 from Paddington
- Carvil Junction – 4:50 from Paddington
- Chadmouth – 4:50 from Paddington
- Chadwick – The Adventure of the Lost Locomotive
- Frothington – Churchill: The Hollywood Years
- Girton – The Adventure of the Lost Locomotive
- Haling Broadway – 4:50 from Paddington
- Kendon-on-Lea – The Adventure of the Lost Locomotive
- Miggleswick – Oh, Mr. Porter!
- Milchester – 4:50 from Paddington
- Milford – Brief Encounter
- Much Snogging On the Green – Carry On Loving
- Mugby Junction – Mugby Junction
- Roxeter – 4:50 from Paddington
- Stillwell Street – The Warriors
- Waverton – 4:50 from Paddington
- Westcombe-on-Sea – Jeeves and Wooster
- Whimperley – Dead Man's Mirror by Agatha Christie

=== Scotland ===
- Hogsmeade – Harry Potter series

=== Wales ===
- Merioneth Central – Ivor the Engine
- Tewyn – Ivor the Engine

=== United States ===
==== Kansas ====
- Fort Leavenworth – Santa Fe Trail
- Four Feather Falls – Four Feather Falls

==== Minnesota ====
- Frostbite Falls – The Rocky and Bullwinkle Show

==== Mississippi ====
- River Landing – Steamboat Bill, Jr.

==== Missouri ====
- Midvale – Casey Jones

==== New York ====
- Shining Time Station – Shining Time Station
- Farhampton Station – How I Met Your Mother

==== New Mexico ====
- Hadleyville – High Noon

==== Texas ====
- Desert Junction – Supertrain

==== Stations in unidentified states ====
- Buffalo Valley – The Munsters
- Indian Flats – The Munsters
- Melton – Petticoat Junction
- Metropolis Union – Superman
- Rancho Relaxo – The Simpsons
- Shelbyville – The Simpsons
- Skidmore – Petticoat Junction
- Springfield – The Simpsons

=== Austria ===
- Gottlespiel Halt – Danger Mouse

=== Other ===
- Edelweiss – Graustark novels by George Barr McCutcheon
- Evergreen Station – The Raccoons
- Frankenstein – Son of Frankenstein
- Goldstadt – Bride of Frankenstein
- New Ankh – Raising Steam
- Strelsau – The Prisoner of Zenda
- Transylvania – Young Frankenstein
- Zootopia Central – Zootopia

== Monorail stations ==
=== Europe ===
- Anderbad – Thunderbirds
- Monte Carlo – Captain Scarlet and the Mysterons
- Perdido Street Station – Bas Lag

=== United States ===
- Brockway – The Simpsons
- North Haverbrook – The Simpsons
- Ogdenville – The Simpsons
- Springfield – The Simpsons

== Stations on atmospheric railways ==
- Van Horne – Ghostbusters II
- Scratch Row – The Springheel Saga

== Island of Sodor ==
- North Western Railway
- Skarloey Railway
- Culdee Fell Railway
- Arlesdale Railway
- Sodor & Mainland Railway

== TR lines ==
=== Japan ===
- Beika (米花駅) – Case Closed

== See also ==
- List of fictional rapid transit stations
