= Tuesday's Child =

Tuesday's Child may refer to:

- Tuesday's Child (newspaper), a 1969–1970 underground publication in Los Angeles, California
- Tuesday's Child (album), a 1999 recording by Amanda Marshall
- "Tuesday's Child" (Holby City), a 2005 episode of the British television series Holby City
- Tuesday's Child (company), a British television production company founded in 2012

== See also ==
- "Monday's Child", a nursery rhyme first published in 1838
- Tuesday's Children, a non-profit family service organization founded in 1998
