= Friday's Child =

Friday's Child may refer to:

== Music ==
- Friday's Child (album), a 2003 album by Will Young
  - "Friday's Child" (Will Young song), a 2004 single from the album
- "Friday's Child" (Wendy Matthews song), 1992
- "Friday's Child", a 1965 song written by Van Morrison and recorded by Them
- "Friday's Child" (1965 song), written by Lee Hazlewood and performed by Nancy Sinatra on the 1967 TV special Movin' With Nancy
- "Friday's Child", a song by Bradley Joseph from the 1994 album Hear the Masses

== Other ==
- Friday's Child (novel), a 1944 novel by Georgette Heyer
- "Friday's Child" (poem), a 1958 poem by W. H. Auden about Dietrich Bonhoeffer
- "Friday's Child" (Star Trek: The Original Series), a 1967 second season episode of Star Trek
- Age Out, a 2018 American crime drama film formerly named Friday's Child

== See also ==
- "Monday's Child", an old children's rhyme and the origin of the phrase
