= Wednesday's Child =

Wednesday's Child may refer to:

- Wednesday's Child, part of "Monday's Child", the nursery rhyme
- Wednesday's Child (play), a 1934 Broadway drama
  - Wednesday's Child (film), a 1934 film adaptation of the play
- Wednesday's Child (novel), a novel by crime writer Peter Robinson
- "Wednesday's Child", a song by Emilíana Torrini from the 1999 album Love in the Time of Science
- Wednesday's Child, a British band formed in 2021 by Emily Roberts and Georgia Williams.
- Wednesday's Child, a long-running weekly segment on Boston station WBZ-TV's news programming
- "Wednesday's Child", a 2022 episode of the BBC medical drama Casualty
- Wednesday's Child Is Full of Woe, a 1963 album by Jody Miller
- "Wednesday's Child is Full of Woe", the 1st episode of the Netflix show Wednesday
- Wednesday's Child, a 2023 collection of short stories by Yiyun Li
- "Wednesday's Child", the sixth episode of the third and final season of Salem.
