= Monday's Child =

Traditional song or poem

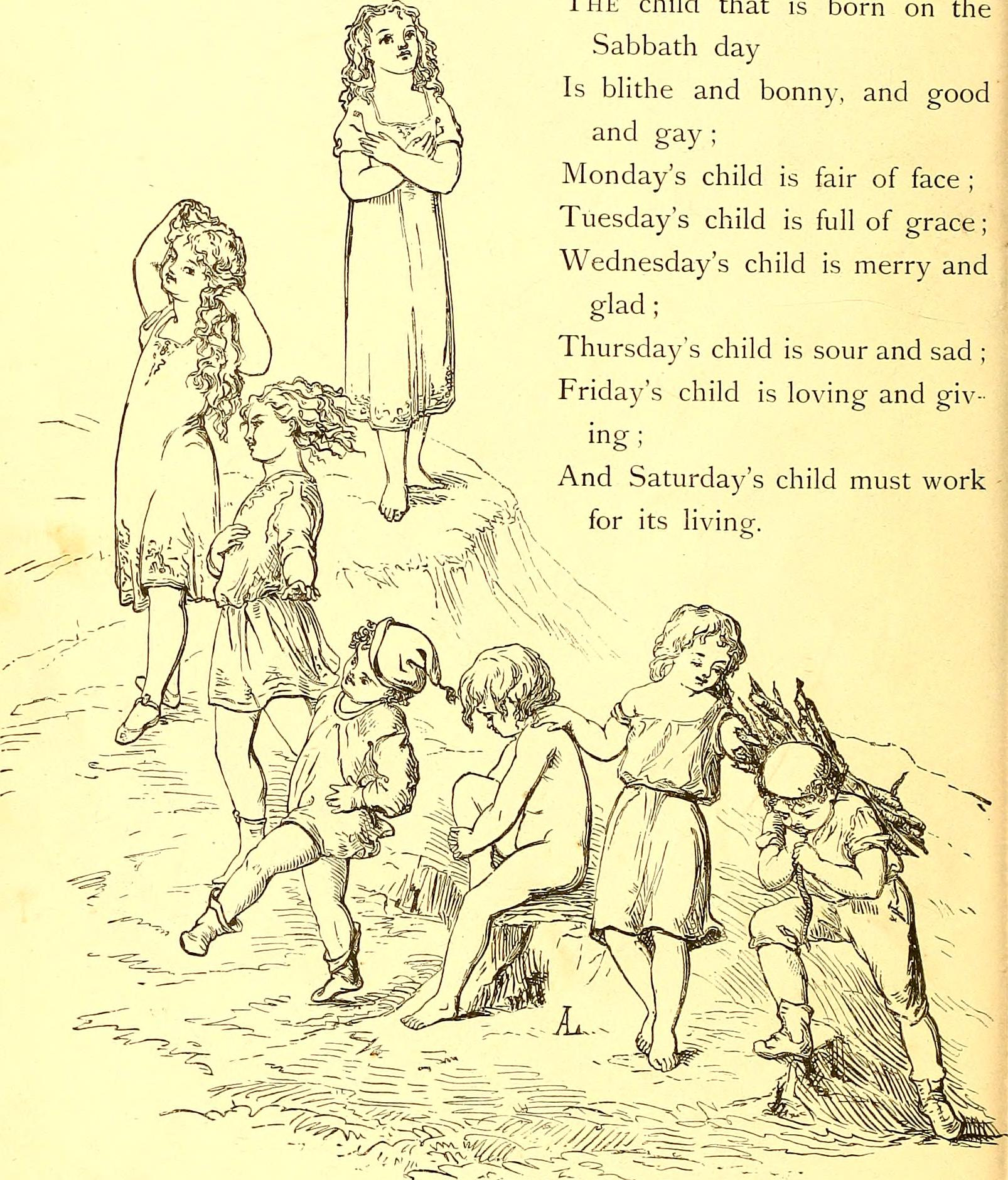
- As published in St. Nicholas Magazine, 1873

Nursery rhyme
- Published: 1836 (first printed source)
- Songwriter: unknown

"Monday's Child" is one of many fortune-telling songs, popular as nursery rhymes for children. It is supposed to tell a child's character or future from their day of birth and to help young children remember the seven days of the week. As with many such rhymes, there are several variants. It has a Roud Folk Song Index number of 19526.

== Lyrics ==
The following is a common modern version:

Monday's child is fair of face,
Tuesday's child is full of grace.
Wednesday's child is full of woe,
Thursday's child has far to go.
Friday's child is loving and giving,
Saturday's child works hard for a living.
But the child that is born on Sabbath day,
Is bonny and blithe, good and gay.

== Origins ==
This rhyme was first recorded in A. E. Bray's Traditions of Devonshire (Volume II, pp. 287–288) in 1836 and was later collected by James Orchard Halliwell in the mid-19th century, varying the final lines to "The child that's born on Christmas Day/ Is fair and wise, good and gay." Later still, another alternative is recorded: "The child of Sunday and Christmas Day,/ Is good and fair, and wise and gay."

The tradition of fortune telling by the day of birth is much older. Thomas Nashe recalled stories told to children in Suffolk in the 1570s which included "what luck eurie [every] one should have by the day of the weeke he was borne on". There was also considerable variation and debate about the exact attributes of each day and even over the days. Unlike modern versions in which "Wednesday's child is full of woe", an earlier incarnation of the rhyme appeared in a multi-part fictional story in a chapter appearing in Harper's Weekly on September 17, 1887, in which "Friday's child is full of woe", perhaps reflecting traditional superstitions associated with bad luck on Friday – as many Christians associated Friday with the Crucifixion. The fates of Thursday's and Saturday's children were also exchanged, and Sunday's child is "happy and wise" instead of "blithe and good".

It has also been suggested that astrological beliefs have contributed to such prophetical lore, since those born on the days concerned are supposed to be under the influence of the gods or planets after which the days are named.

== Other versions ==
A more concise variant is recorded as

Born on Monday, fair in the face,
Born on Tuesday, full of God's grace,
Born on Wednesday, sour and sad,
Born on Thursday, merry and glad,
Born on Friday, worthily given,
Born on Saturday, work hard for your living,
Born on Sunday, you will never know want.

Yet another prediction begins the list on a Sunday, rather than ending on that day:

Sunday's child is full of grace,
Monday's child is full in the face,
Tuesday's child is solemn and sad,
Wednesday's child is merry and glad,
Thursday's child is inclined to thieving,
Friday's child is free in giving,
And Saturday's child works hard for his living.

Unrhymed traditions from North-East England were also reported in the 19th century:

If a man-child was born on a Sunday it was believed that he would live without anxiety and be handsome. If born on a Monday he was certain to be killed. Those born on a Tuesday grew up sinful and perverse, while those born on a Wednesday were waspish in temper. A child born on Thursday, however, was sure to be of a peaceful and easy disposition, though averse to women. Friday was supposed to be the most unlucky day of all, it being prophesied that a child born on this day would grow up to be silly, crafty, a thief, and a coward, and that he would not live longer than mid-age. If born on a Saturday, his deeds would be renowned : he would live to be an alderman, many things would happen to him, and he would live long.

The complete rhyme was later included by John Rutter for a cappella choir in the collection Five Childhood Lyrics, first published in 1974.

== See also ==
- Tuesday's Child (disambiguation)
- Wednesday's Child (disambiguation)
- Thursday's Child (disambiguation)
- Friday's Child (disambiguation)
- "Saturday's Child"
- Sunday's Child
