= Thursday's Child (Streatfeild novel) =

First edition Cover artist: Peggy Fortnum

Thursday's Child is a children's historical novel by Noel Streatfeild, set in turn-of-the-century England. It was first published in Great Britain by William Collins, Sons in 1970 and was followed by a sequel, Far to Go, in 1976. Its most recent release was a Collins paperback in 1999. The novel was adapted for television as a six-part series broadcast 1972–1973.

== Title ==
The title of the novel and its sequel are taken from the traditional rhyme "Monday's Child".

== Plot summary ==
The book is about a foundling, Margaret Thursday, who was named after the day she was discovered. As she tells the orphanage children, "I'm not properly an orphan. I was found on a Thursday on the church steps, with three of everything, all of the very best quality." A confident and spirited child, she is determined to make her way in the world and become famous.

Margaret soon becomes the archenemy of the cruel matron at St. Luke's, where she is sent by well-meaning people when she is ten. Things reach such a dreadful state that she decides to run away from the orphanage, taking along her friends Peter and Horatio and her "three of everything". So the children flee in the night to become the unlikeliest leggers ever seen on a canal boat and performers in a travelling theatrical troupe.

== Television adaptation ==
The BBC broadcast a six-part adaptation of Thursday's Child on BBC One between 27 December 1972 and 31 January 1973. The German company Pidax released a dual-language DVD of the series in 2013.
