= Peter Whitbread =

English actor and screenwriter (1928–2004)

Peter Bruce Pauling Whitbread (25 October 1928 – 26 October 2004) was an English actor and screenwriter.

He was born in Norfolk, England and educated at Gresham's School, Holt, Norfolk.

He had a long career in the theatre, including several seasons with the New Shakespeare Company. In his later years, he devised and performed one-man shows.

Beyond acting, Whitbread worked as a director, playwright and screenwriter. He concentrated mostly on writing for the theatre, and in 1974 his drama Mr Axelford’s Angel won the Emmy Award for Best Television Play. He also wrote scripts for the television soap opera Emmerdale Farm, and all the episodes of Southern Television children's series The Flockton Flyer.

He died after a road accident near his home at Briningham, near Melton Constable, Norfolk.

== Selected filmography ==
- The Eagle of the Ninth (1977) as Marcus' father
- Troilus & Cressida (1981) as Calchas
- Great Expectations (1981) as Compeyson
- Swallows and Amazons Forever!: Coot Club (1984) as Rodley
- The Burston Rebellion (1985) as Noah Sandy
- Paris by Night (1988) as English Lecturer
- Heritage Africa (1989) as Sir Robert Guggiswood
