= Davy Jones discography =

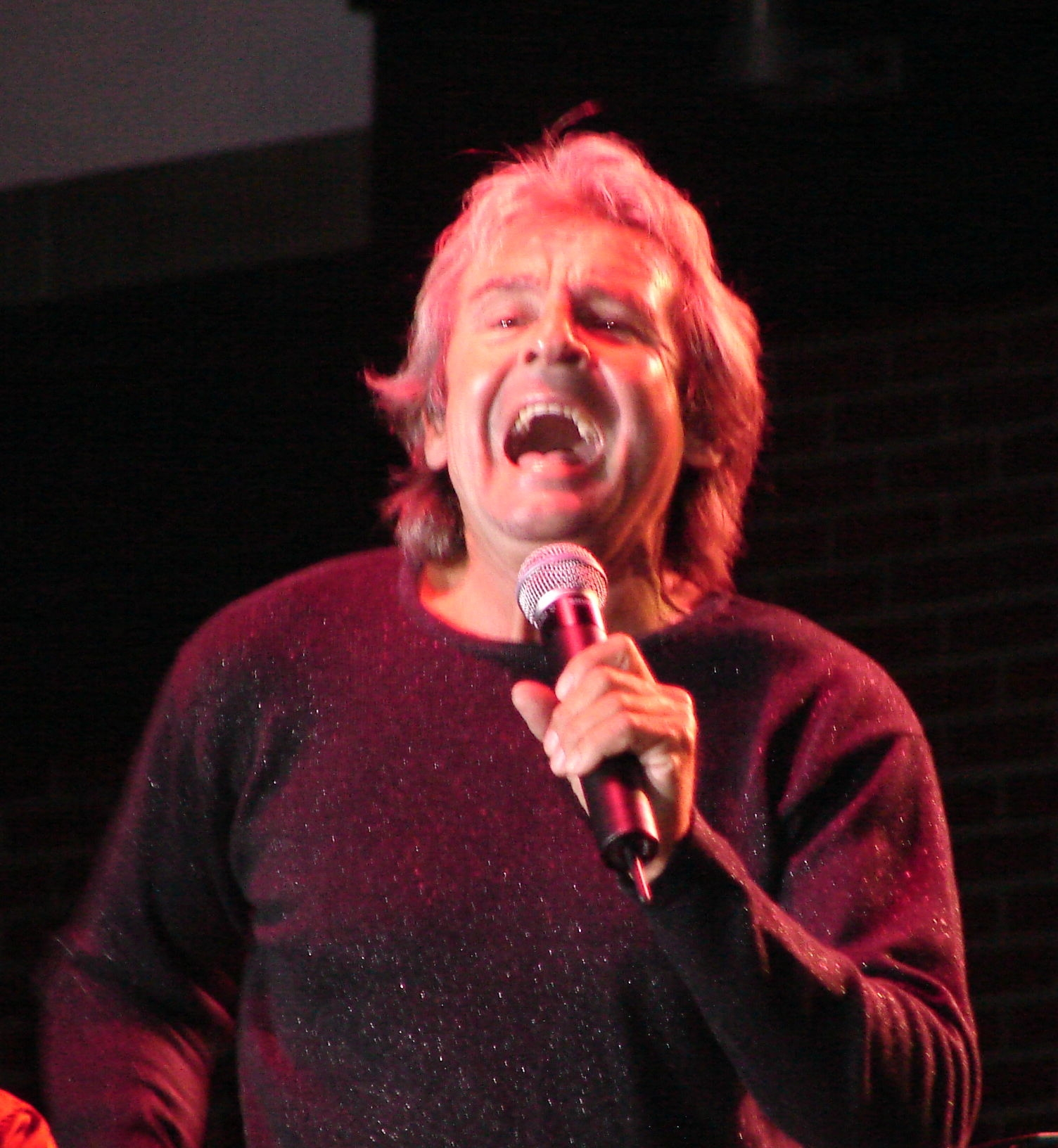
- Jones at a 2006 concert in Geneva, Illinois
- Studio albums: 8
- Extended plays: 1
- Live albums: 7
- Compilation albums: 10
- Singles: 25
- Music videos: 3

The following is a list of albums, singles, music videos and extended plays by British singer Davy Jones, who was a member of the Monkees.

== Albums ==
=== Studio albums ===
| Title | Album details | Peak chart positions | | |
| Title | Album details | US BB | US CB | JPN |
|---|---|---|---|---|
| David Jones | Released: September 1965; Label: Colpix; Formats: LP | 185 | 73 | — |
| Davy Jones | Released: October 1971; Label: Bell | 205 | — | 31 (Note: Charted upon reissue in 1981.) |
| The Point | Released: January 1978; Label: MCA | — | — | — |
| Incredible Revisited | Released: 1988; Label: Dome Press | — | — | — |
| It's Christmas Time Again | Released: 1991 (recorded in 1976); Label: Dome Press | — | — | — |
| Just Me | Released: 2001; Label: Hercules Productions | — | — | — |
| Just Me 2 | Released: 2004; Label: Hercules Productions | — | — | — |
| She | Released: November 2009; Label: Fire Inside Productions | — | — | — |
"—" denotes releases that did not chart or were not released in that territory.

=== Live albums ===
| Title | Album details |
|---|---|
| Live in Japan | Released: 1981; Label: Japan; Japan-only release |
| Hello Davy/Davy Jones Live | Released: 1982; Label: Warner Pioneer; Japan-only release |
| Teen Idols 1998 Tour | Released: 1998; Label: Teen Idols; With Peter Noone and Bobby Sherman |
| Live!!! | Released: 2004; Label: Hercules Productions |
| Unplugged in the Morning – Radio Broadcast 1998 | Released: 2011; Label: Fire Inside Productions |
| Billtown Bus Stop Radio Hour 12/7/09 | Released: 2011; Label: Fire Inside Productions |
| Live in Tokyo 1999 | Released: 2011; Label: Hercules Productions; Formats: CD, LP, digital download |

=== Compilation albums ===
| Title | Album details |
|---|---|
| The Best | Released: 1981; Label: Arista; Japan-only release |
| Don't Go | Released: 1998; Label: Hercules Productions |
| Just for the Record Volume Four | Released: 1996; Label: Hercules Productions |
| Just for the Record Volume One | Released: 1999; Label: Hercules Productions |
| Just for the Record Volume Two | Released: 1999; Label: Hercules Productions |
| Just for the Record Volume Three | Released: 1999; Label: Hercules Productions |
| Daydream Believin' – Time Tested Hits & Rarities | Released: 2004; Label: Hercules Productions |
| Wild Ponies: Lost & Found Rarities (Volume 1) | Released: 2011; Label: Fire Inside Productions |
| Wild Ponies: Lost & Found Rarities (Volume 2) | Released: 2011; Label: Fire Inside Productions |
| Wild Ponies: Lost & Found Rarities (Volume 3) | Released: 2011; Label: Fire Inside Productions |
| Manchester Boy: Personal File | Released: 2022; Label: 7a |
| Music And Memories: The MGM Years | Released: 2025; Label: 7a |

== EPs ==
| Title | EP details |
|---|---|
| Little by Little | Released: 2011; Label: Fire Inside Productions |

== Singles ==
| Titles (A-side, B-side) Both sides from same album except where indicated | Year | Peak chart positions | | | | | | | | Album |
| Titles (A-side, B-side) Both sides from same album except where indicated | Year | US BB | US CB | AUS | CAN | DEN | JPN | SWE | UK | Album |
|---|---|---|---|---|---|---|---|---|---|---|
| "Dream Girl" b/w "Take Me to Paradise" (Non-album track) | 1965 | — | — | 7 (Note: Charted upon reissue in 1967.) | — | — | — | — | — | David Jones |
| "What Are We Going to Do?" b/w "This Bouquet" | 1965 | 93 | 94 | 88 (Note: Charted upon reissue in 1968.) | — | — | — | — | — | David Jones |
| "The Girl from Chelsea" b/w "Theme for a New Love (I Saw You Only Once)" (from David Jones) | 1965 | — | — | — 4 | — | — | — | — | — | Non-album track |
| "It Ain't Me Babe" (Note: "It Ain't Me Babe" was only released as a single in the UK, Scandinavia, Australasia and Japan.) b/w "Baby It's Me" | 1967 | — | — | 56 | — | — | — | 4 | 55 (Note: Chart position is from the official UK "Breakers List".) | David Jones |
| "Maybe It's Because I'm a Londoner" (Note: "Maybe It's Because I'm a Londoner" was only released as a single in Scandinavia.) b/w "Put Me Amongst the Girls" | 1967 | — | — | — | — | 3 | — | 10 | — | David Jones |
| "Theme for a New Love" (Note: "Theme for a New Love" was only released as a single in the UK, New Zealand and Southern Africa.) b/w "Dream Girl" | 1967 | — | — | — | — | — | — | — | — | David Jones |
| "My Dad" (Note: "My Dad" was only released as a single in Australia.) b/w "Face Up to It" | 1968 | — | — | — | — | — | — | — | — | David Jones |
| "Do It in the Name of Love" (both sides with Micky Dolenz) b/w "Lady Jane" | 1971 | — | — | — | — | — | — | — | — | Non-album tracks |
| "Rainy Jane" b/w "Welcome to My Love" | 1971 | 52 | 32 | 78 | 14 | — | — | — | — | Davy Jones |
| "I Really Love You" b/w "Sitting in the Apple Tree" | 1971 | 107 | 96 | — | — | — | — | — | — | Davy Jones |
| "Girl" b/w "Take My Love" (from Davy Jones) | 1971 | — | — | — | — | — | — | — | — | No-album tracks |
| "I'll Believe in You" b/w "The Road to Love" (from Davy Jones) | 1972 | — | — | — | — | — | — | — | — | No-album tracks |
| "You're a Lady" b/w "Who Was It?" | 1972 | — | — | — | — | — | — | — | — | No-album tracks |
| "Rubberene" (Note: "Rubberene" was only released as a promotional single, with the A-side mono and the B-side stereo.) b/w "Rubberene" | 1973 | — | — | — | — | — | — | — | — | No-album tracks |
| "Life Line" (Note: "Life Line" was only released as a single in the UK.) b/w "It's a Jungle Out There" (by Micky Dolenz); "Gotta Get Up" (by Jones and Dolenz) | 1978 | — | — | — | — | — | — | — | — | The Point |
| "(Hey Ra Ra Ra) Happy Birthday Mickey Mouse" (Note: "(Hey Ra Ra Ra) Happy Birthday Mickey Mouse" was only released as a single in the UK.) b/w "You Don't Have to Be a Country Boy to Sing a Country Song" | 1978 | — | — | — | — | — | — | — | — | Non-album tracks |
| "It's Now" (Note: "It's Now" was only released as a single in Japan.) b/w "How Do You Know" | 1981 | — | — | — | — | — | 64 | — | — | Live in Japan |
| "Dance, Gypsy" (Note: "Dance, Gypsy" was only released as a single in Japan.) b/w "Can She Do It (Like She Dances)" | 1981 | — | — | — | — | — | 60 | — | — | Hello Davy/Davy Jones Live |
| "Sixteen Baby, You'll Soon Be Sixteen" (Note: "Sixteen Baby, You'll Soon Be Sixteen" was only released as a single in Japan.) b/w "Baby, Holdout" | 1982 | — | — | — | — | — | — | — | — | Hello Davy/Davy Jones Live |
| "I'll Love You Forever" b/w "When I Look Back on Christmas" | 1984 | — | — | — | — | — | — | — | — | Non-album tracks |
| "After Your Heart" (Note: "After Your Heart" was only released as a single in Australia.) b/w "Hippy Hippy Shake" | 1987 | — | — | — | — | — | — | — | — | Incredible Revisited |
| "It's Christmas" | 1997 | — | — | — | — | — | — | — | — | Non-album tracks |
| "Amore" | 2010 | — | — | — | — | — | — | — | — | Non-album tracks |
| "Daydream Believer" b/w "I Wanna Be Free" | 2017 | — | — | — | — | — | — | — | — | Live in Japan |
| "Rainbows" b/w "You Don't Have to Be a Country Boy to Sing a Country Song" | 2018 | — | — | — | — | — | — | — | — | Live in Japan |
"—" denotes releases that did not chart or were not released in that territory.

== Other songs ==
- "(Theme From) Mr. Wong" (2000)
- "Your Personal Penguin" (2008)

== Music videos ==
- "After Your Heart" (1987)
- "Daydream Believer" (re-recorded: 1994)
- "(Theme From) Mr. Wong" (2000)

== Lead vocals with the Monkees ==
| Song | Album | Notes |
|---|---|---|
| I Wanna Be Free | The Monkees (1966) | |
| This Just Doesn't Seem to Be My Day | The Monkees (1966) | |
| I'll Be True to You | The Monkees (1966) | |
| Gonna Buy Me a Dog | The Monkees (1966) | Co-lead with Micky Dolenz |
| When Love Comes Knockin' (At Your Door) | More of the Monkees (1967) | |
| Hold on Girl | More of the Monkees (1967) | |
| Look Out (Here Comes Tomorrow) | More of the Monkees (1967) | |
| The Day We Fall in Love | More of the Monkees (1967) | |
| Laugh | More of the Monkees (1967) | |
| A Little Bit Me, a Little Bit You | Non-album single (1967) | No. 2 on Billboard Hot 100 |
| Forget That Girl | Headquarters (1967) | |
| Shades of Gray | Headquarters (1967) | Co-lead with Peter Tork |
| I Can't Get Her Off My Mind | Headquarters (1967) | |
| Early Morning Blues and Greens | Headquarters (1967) | |
| She Hangs Out | Pisces, Aquarius, Capricorn & Jones Ltd. (1967) | |
| Cuddly Toy | Pisces, Aquarius, Capricorn & Jones Ltd. (1967) | |
| Hard to Believe | Pisces, Aquarius, Capricorn & Jones Ltd. (1967) | |
| Star Collector | Pisces, Aquarius, Capricorn & Jones Ltd. (1967) | |
| Dream World | The Birds, The Bees & The Monkees (1968) | |
| We Were Made for Each Other | The Birds, The Bees & The Monkees (1968) | |
| Daydream Believer | The Birds, The Bees & The Monkees (1968) | No. 1 on Billboard Hot 100 & No. 5 on UK charts |
| The Poster | The Birds, The Bees & The Monkees (1968) | |
| Valleri | The Birds, The Bees & The Monkees (1968) | No. 3 on Billboard Hot 100 & No. 12 on UK charts |
| It's Nice to Be with You | Non-album single (1968) | No. 51 on Billboard Hot 100 |
| Daddy's Song | Head (1968) | |
| Don't Listen to Linda | Instant Replay (1969) | |
| Me Without You | Instant Replay (1969) | |
| You and I | Instant Replay (1969) | |
| The Girl I Left Behind Me | Instant Replay (1969) | |
| A Man Without a Dream | Instant Replay (1969) | |
| Someday Man | Non-album single (1969) | No. 81 on Billboard Hot 100 & No. 44 on UK charts |
| If I Knew | The Monkees Present (1969) | |
| Looking for the Good Times | The Monkees Present (1969) | |
| Ladies Aid Society | The Monkees Present (1969) | |
| French Song | The Monkees Present (1969) | |
| You're So Good to Me | Changes (1970) | |
| 99 Pounds | Changes (1970) | |
| Do You Feel It Too? | Changes (1970) | |
| I Never Thought It Peculiar | Changes (1970) | |
| Do It in the Name of Love | Non-album single (1971) | Did not chart (Credited to "Micky Dolenz & Davy Jones") |
| Lady Jane | B-side of "Do It in the Name of Love" | Did not chart |
| If You Have the Time | Missing Links (1987) | Recorded in 1969 |
| Party | Missing Links (1987) | Recorded in 1968 |
| Storybook of You | Missing Links (1987) | Recorded in 1969 |
| My Share of the Sidewalk | Missing Links (1987) | Recorded in 1968 |
| So Goes Love | Missing Links (1987) | Recorded in 1966 |
| War Games | Missing Links (1987) | Recorded in 1968 |
| Time and Time Again | Missing Links (1987) | Recorded in 1969 |
| Long Way Home | Pool It! (1987) | |
| (I'll) Love You Forever | Pool It! (1987) | |
| Every Step of the Way | Pool It! (1987) | |
| She's Movin' in with Rico | Pool It! (1987) | |
| Counting on You | Pool It! (1987) | |
| Changes | Missing Links Volume Two (1990) | Recorded in 1968 |
| Penny Music | Missing Links Volume Three (1996) | Recorded in 1969 |
| Look Down | Missing Links Volume Three (1996) | Recorded in 1968 |
| Oh, What a Night | Justus (1996) | |
| You and I | Justus (1996) | Re-recording of Dolenz, Jones, Boyce & Hart song |
| Run Away from Life | Justus (1996) | |
| It's Not Too Late | Justus (1996) | |
| If I Learned to Play the Violin | Headquarters (Deluxe Edition) (2007) | Recorded in 1967 |
| Ceiling in My Room | The Birds, The Bees & The Monkees (Deluxe Edition) (2010) | Recorded in 1967 |
| Love to Love | Good Times! (2016) | Recorded in 1967; backing vocals recorded in 2016. First issued on Monkeemania (40 Timeless Hits) (1979) |
| Mele Kalikimaka | Christmas Party (2018) | |
| Silver Bells | Christmas Party (2018) | |
