= Any Old Iron (song) =

Music hall song

"Any Old Iron" is a British music hall song with lyrics written by Charles Collins and Fred E. Terry, and music by E.A. Sheppard. Harry Champion sang it as part of his act, and recorded it in 1911.

The song title and refrain is a pun on the traditional cry of the rag-and-bone trade. The song may also be a coded reference to the singer as a gay man, or a man taken to be gay. In Cockney rhyming slang, iron means a gay man (iron = iron hoof = poof), gay men had adopted a green tie as their badge, and a fob watch and chain was dapper dressing. The song begins with the singer thinking "I look a dandy" being followed by "a lot of kiddies" shouting at him "Any Old Iron". The song is understood this way by Albert Steptoe, a rag-and-bone man, in the TV comedy Steptoe and Son, Series 5, broadcast in 1970.

== Other versions ==
- In 1957, Peter Sellers recorded a rendition in a voice he created for The Goon Show, Willium "Mate" Cobblers. It reached No. 17 in the UK Singles Chart that year. Sellers had previously performed it as Major Dennis Bloodnok (with Spike Milligan as Minnie Bannister) in a 1954 episode of The Goon Show titled "The Booted Gorilla".
- Davy Jones, later of The Monkees, performed a version on David Jones, a 1965 solo album.
- It was performed on The Muppet Show by Kermit the Frog, joined by Fozzie Bear, two whatnots, and the audience. [Season 2, Episode 14 (Elton John)]
- It was performed by Roger Daltrey, accompanied by The Chieftains, in Belfast, Northern Ireland in 1992. A recording of the performance appears on the album An Irish Evening.
- It was included in The Boy Friend, Ken Russell's 1971 film version of the musical by Sandy Wilson.
- There is a scene in Richard Attenborough's 1992 biopic Chaplin where Charlie and Syd meet just before Charlie's audition for music hall impresario Mr. Karno, they greet each other by singing the chorus to "Any Old Iron".
- It was also sung by Chas and Dave on their 2015 album "Enjoy Yourself" (The Complete Jamboree Bag).
- In one episode of Are You Being Served?, "The Hand of Fate", Mr. Mash cannot find the owner of a shipment of 27 galvanized buckets, and starts singing the song and accompanying himself by rattling the buckets around.
- The Barron Knights used the tune and some of the lyrics of the song in a satire on punk, in the late 1970s.
- The band Snuff included the song as a previously unreleased track on their 2005 compilation: Six Of One, Half A Dozen Of The Other 1986-2002.
- British comedian Bill Bailey, along with the BBC Concert Orchestra, as part of his live show "Bill Bailey's Remarkable Guide to the Orchestra", mixed the song in as part of a "Cockney Arrangement" of the "William Tell Overture".
- Somerset band The Wurzels sample the song's melody in their song Blackbird.
- The song was used, with different lyrics, in television advertisements for Hammerite and Smoothrite paint.
- In the T-Bag series; 'T-Bag and the Revenge of the T-Set', in the third episode ('Lost in Space') the character; T-shirt starts singing the first part of the song when T-Bag is using a metal detector.
- There is a sequence in the movie Yellow Submarine when the "real" Beatles are confronted with their look-alikes trapped in a blue glass sphere, inspiring John to go off on an abstruse invocation of Einstein's Theory of relativity, to which Paul's response is to sing "Any old Ein! Any old Ein! Any any any old Einstein!"
- Scunthorpe United F.C. ("The Iron") have adopted this song, and it is played before all of their home games.
- In Top Gear Series 18, Jeremy and James sing the song in jest as Richard drives the old style Morgan 3-Wheeler through a corner.
- In the 2001 Steven Spielberg movie A.I. Artificial Intelligence, while the rejected robots are being chased by the bikers for a "Flesh Fair", the commander of the illuminated hot-air balloon is repeatedly saying over a loudspeaker "Any old iron".
