= Just Me =

Just Me may refer to:

== Music albums ==
- Just Me (Brian McKnight album), 2011
- Just Me (Keith Sweat album), 2008
- Just Me (Sarah Geronimo album), 2008
- Just Me (Tiffany album), 2007
- Just Me (Tina Arena album), 2001
- Just Me (Davy Jones album), 2001
- Just Me (Clive Palmer album), 1978

== Other ==
- Just Me (film), a 1950 French film directed by Marc-Gilbert Sauvajon
- Just Me (fragrance), a Parlux Fragrances fragrance endorsed by Paris Hilton
