= Dave, Emily and Chainsaw =

US radio program

The DSC Show
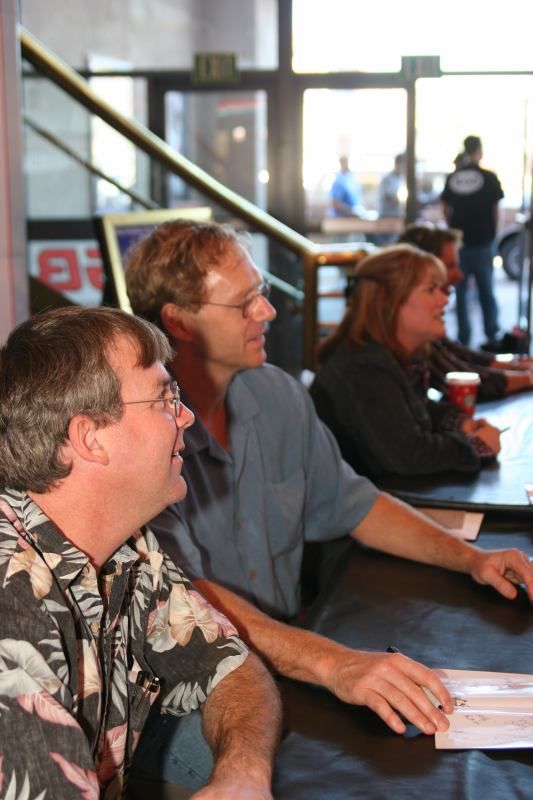
- From near to far: Christopher Boyer, Chainsaw, Shelly, and Dave
- Genre: Shock jock, morning zoo
- Running time: Four hours (6-10 AM PT)
- Country of origin: United States
- Home station: KGB-FM (1990–1992, 1995–2009, 2018–2022); KIOZ (1992–1997); KFMB-FM (2010–2018)
- Hosted by: Dave Rickards; Cookie "Chainsaw" Randolph
- Starring: Chris Boyer; Sarah Beebe; Emily Maguire (2018-2022); Shelly Dunn (retired 2018); "Ruth 66" (fired 2020)
- Created by: Cookie "Chainsaw" Randolph
- Produced by: Sarah Beebe (2018-2022)
- Executive producer: Emily Maguire (2001-2018)
- Edited by: Chris Boyer (2018-2022)
- Original release: April 1, 1990 – December 23, 2022
- Opening theme: Summer Song (Joe Satriani song)
- Website: 101kgb.iheart.com/featured/dsc/
- Podcast: www.iheart.com/podcast/731-DSC-29668130/

The DSC Show, formerly The Dawn Patrol and The Dave, Shelly, and Chainsaw Show (DSC), also known simply as Dave and Chainsaw, was a long-running morning radio show in the San Diego, California, area. Broadcast on weekday mornings on San Diego's KGB-FM, the show is named for its main hosts: Dave Rickards and Cookie "Chainsaw" Randolph, known as the "Dean of American Sportscasters". The show debuted on April 1, 1990, with Shelly Dunn as a member of the trio; she retired from broadcasting in July 2018 and was replaced by Emily Jane Maguire, the show's then-producer.

The format of the show combined humor, parodies, news, and skits. The show's bawdy humor and irreverent attitude, described as "raucous and often hilarious", sometimes sparked controversy. That said, the show was marketed as "San Diego's most dependably hilarious morning radio show".

In addition to the radio programming, the show produced three comedic films starring Denver Dave, Shelly, and Chainsaw. The group also released 18 annual "Best of" CDs featuring the show's regular cast members. The proceeds from the CDs and DVDs, usually released around Christmas, supported the show's charity fund that assisted San Diego residents in need.

== Programming history ==
The Dave, Shelly, and Chainsaw Show debuted in 1990, on KGB-FM as The Dawn Patrol. In 1992, the group moved to Rock 102 and changed the show's name to The Dave, Shelly, and Chainsaw Show, often referred to as simply DSC. In 1996, both radio stations were purchased by Jacor Broadcasting (which was later bought by Clear Channel). At that time, the show moved to 105.3 KIOZ (formerly KCBQ) . DSC returned to KGB in 1997.

In January 2010, Clear Channel abruptly canceled the show, with executives citing an "inability to reach an agreement" with the performers. The cast claimed that no agreement was even attempted. Fans of the show protested and staged rallies, to no avail. The show remained off the air until August 2, 2010, when it was picked up by Jack 100.7 FM. The show initially featured Rickards and Randolph, without Dunn, who was still under contract with Clear Channel. 100.7 dropped DSC in the summer of 2018, after which the show returned once again to KGB.

Co-host Shelly Dunn retired in July 2018.

In addition to Rickards, Maguire, and Randolph, the show included a supporting cast consisting of Chris Boyer, percussionist and comic foil; producer Sarah Beebe, news producer who also screened listener calls; and Elaina Smith, affectionately dubbed the "Mexican Leprechaun" by other members of the show. While Dunn was in a contract dispute with Clear Channel, Smith substituted for Dunn on air. Former cast members have included: Nina Reeba (known as Ruth 66) with weather and traffic reports; sports producer David "Bromo" Abromowitz; Shelly Brown (nicknamed "Chucko" to avoid confusion with Shelly Dunn); and Anna Blake, who took over news production and call-screening when Sarah filled in for Emily (see below).

On July 26, 2022, Emily Maguire was fired from iHeartMedia and removed from the DSC Show.

On November 1, 2022, it was announced that Dave and Chainsaw would be retiring at the end of the year. The last DSC broadcast was scheduled to air on December 16, 2022, but Rickards contracted coronavirus and stayed home that week; this pushed back the final broadcast date by a week, and on December 23, Dave Rickards and Cookie "Chainsaw" Randolph signed off for the final time. Former “DSC” cast members Sarah Beebe and Chris Boyer continued with their own show: KGB Mornings with Sarah and Boyer. Later additions to the program include Clint August as co-host and former Charger Rich Ohrnberger with the sports report.

== Film development ==
The J-K Conspiracy

The J-K Conspiracy is a 2004 film directed by Chainsaw, and produced jointly by Denver Dave, Shelly, and Chainsaw. The film stars the entire cast of The Dave, Shelly, and Chainsaw Show. The story is a semi-fictional tale, written by Jules Hypenstein and based on a real event that took place several years before the movie was made.

Plot: The J through K volume of Chainsaw's World Book encyclopedia has been stolen and (in the movie) Chainsaw accuses Dave of stealing it, triggering a comedic misadventure with guest appearances by co-starring Bob Costas, Dom Irrera, Doug Flutie, Davy Jones, Dr. Laura Schlessinger, and Don Rickles. Along the way, viewers get an inside look at real-life flashbacks, radio station politics, bizarre secret meetings, and conspiracy theories, along with the nightlife parties, sporting events, and live comedy.

The Trouble With Money

The Trouble with Money is the second film produced by Denver Dave, Shelly, and Chainsaw.

Plot: Shamus O'Reilly is supposed to receive $1 million for a scandalous videotape desperately wanted by notorious businessman Kaiser Poppo. Before Shamus arrives for the switch, Poppo's thugs accidentally give the money to Shamus look-alike Dave Rickards, a local radio host in the wrong place at the wrong time. Rickards is chased through the streets of downtown San Diego and onto a train, where he makes a clean getaway with the cash. Now Poppo not only wants the videotape but his money back and must contend with the FBI, con men, and his long-time nemesis "The Greek". Despite advice from San Diego Mayor Jerry Sanders and Watergate legend G. Gordon Liddy, Rickards loses track of both the money and the videotape. He is then tricked into a dramatic showdown with Poppo, and the secret of the videotape is finally revealed. Shot entirely in San Diego County; cameos from Bob Costas, Luke Walton and Bill Walton.

No-Brainer

No-Brainer is the third film by Dave, Shelly, and Chainsaw. Cameos from many celebrities including Will Ferrell, Bob Saget, Paula Abdul, Paula Poundstone, and recurring guest Bob Costas.

== Podcast & Best Of ==
Since 2013, the show has produced a podcast recording of the live program, each day shortly after it goes off-air. Their "Best of..." CDs are also available in downloadable format, from the KFMB site store. The sale of these "Best Of" downloads go to the DSC Fund.
