= Hammer paint =

Lacquer that looks like hammered metal when dried

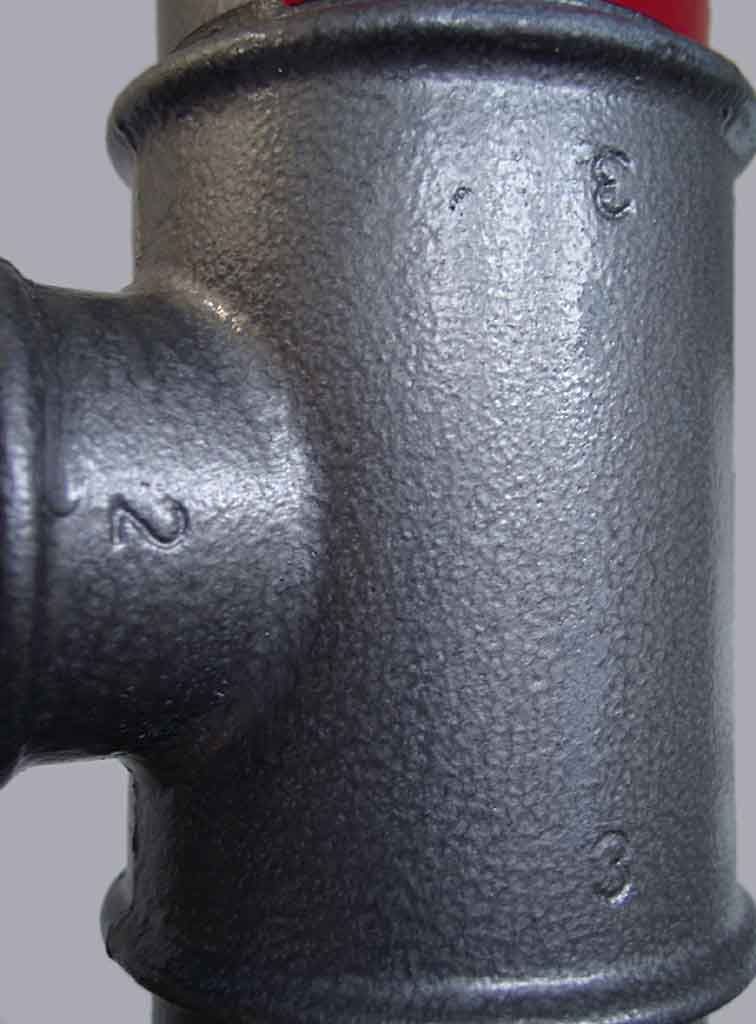
Hammer paint on a piece of pipe

Hammer paint (or hammered paint) is a special lacquer with a surface that looks like hammered metal when dried. It is also known as hammertone.

== Composition ==
The slightly iridescent areas are caused by the different orientation of very small shiny particles, which are suspended in the lacquer. These particles are often made of the mineral mica. Mica is resilient, reflective, refractive, dielectric, chemically inert, insulating, lightweight, and hydrophilic. Alternatively, aluminium or bronze powder may be used. To make the "hammered" effect more pronounced, a small amount of silicone oil may be added directly before application.

== Purposes ==
Hammer paint is often used to beautify technical apparatus or as a protective coating. The optical advantage of hammer paint is that surfaces look acceptable even if the underlying surface is not flat and smooth. To get a regular paint to look smooth, the surface would have to be prepared first, for example, by spackling, sanding, grinding or polishing. With hammer paint, this step can be omitted. Some hammer paints (e.g. by Hammerite) are formulated to be usable directly on rusted steel without surface preparation other than brushing to remove the loose rust.

Beyond that, the mica improves the durability and color of the paint job. The mica reduces aging by protecting the underlying binders from UV radiation. The mica also makes hammer paint relatively hard and scratch-resistant.

== See also ==
- Wrinkle paint
