= A Little Bit of Cucumber =

"A Little Bit of Cucumber" is a cockney music hall song, written by T. W. Conner for the comedian and singer Harry Champion, who first performed it in 1915; it was published by Francis, Day & Hunter Ltd. the same year. The song is about the joys of certain types of food, which were popular at the time with the cockney working class community of East London; the words have also long been seen as containing a double entendre.

The song is intended to be sung at a fast tempo. The lyrics centre around the culinary preferences of the working-classes including cucumbers; the vegetable is then compared to other types of food, but by the end of the song the cucumber is affirmed to be the preferable delicacy. It was the second song adopted into Champion's repertoire which centred on food, the first being "Boiled Beef and Carrots" in 1909.
