= Harry Wincott =

- Born: Alfred James Walden; 1 January 1867; Lambeth, London, England
- Died: 20 April 1947 (aged 80); Yeovil, Somerset, England
- Occupation: Songwriter
- Years active: c.1880s–1930s

Alfred James Walden (1 January 1867 – 20 April 1947), known professionally as Harry Wincott, was an English songwriter.

== Biography ==
He was born in Lambeth, London, the eldest child of Charlotte and Alfred Walden, a coach builder. He started work as a clerk but began writing songs and aged 16 sold one of his songs to music hall performer Alfred Vance, "The Great Vance". Eventually he became successful selling other songs to well-known singers including Vesta Tilley.

Wincott was the writer of many popular music hall and pub songs. His most prolific writing period was between 1890 and 1920 and he claimed to have produced more than 2000 songs in total. One of his earliest patrons was the father of Charlie Chaplin, who predicted 'that child will be a great comedian one day'. His works included "The Old Dun Cow", "Mademoiselle from Armentières", "How's Your Father?", and "Father's Got ‘em", which was to be performed by Debra Paget in the 1952 movie, Stars and Stripes, amongst many others. Wincott composed songs for artists such as: Dan Leno, Marie Lloyd, Charles Austin, The Great Vance, Vesta Tilley, Florrie Forde, Harry Champion and Kate Carney. Possibly his most well-known song is "The Little Shirt My Mother Made For Me", sung by Tom Wooton and subsequently recorded by the country singer Marty Robbins among others. He made relatively little money from his songs, as he sold the rights cheaply.

On 23 March 1889, he married his cousin, Eliza Mary Ann Dyer, in Leeds. They moved back to London and there had eight children between 1892 and 1902. After her death in 1926, Wincott struggled financially, and a benefit concert was held to raise money for him and his family. On 6 March 1937, when he was 70 years-old, he married his second wife, Margaret 'Daisy' Pink at Lambeth Registry Office, and shortly afterwards they moved to live in Yeovil, Somerset.

He died of gangrene of the legs in Yeovil in 1947, aged 80. He had been admitted to the local public assistance institution a couple of weeks previously, there being no spare bed at the local hospital. One of his last requests to his wife was for a pint of beer.
