= Girl (Davy Jones song) =

- 2012 US re-release

Single by Davy Jones

from the album Davy Jones
- B-side: "Take My Love"
- Released: November 1971
- Recorded: 1970–1971
- Length: 2:40
- Label: Bell
- Songwriters: Charles Fox, Norman Gimbel

Davy Jones singles chronology
| "I Really Love You" (1971) | "Girl" (1971) | "I'll Believe in You" (1972) |

Green vinyl issue
- 2012 release

"Girl" is the 8th single by British singer/actor Davy Jones, written by Charles Fox and Norman Gimbel. It is not Jones' most successful single ("Rainy Jane", peaking at 52 on Billboard Hot 100, number 32 on Cash Box and number 14 in Canada), but his most remembered one, appearing in The Brady Bunch episode "Getting Davy Jones" and again in The Brady Bunch Movie. It also appears, with slightly different lyrics, as the main-title theme for the 1971 movie Star Spangled Girl starring Sandy Duncan.

== Brady Bunch TV appearance ==
In The Brady Bunch episode "Getting Davy Jones", Jones is singing the song in a local recording studio when Marcia Brady comes in and asks if she can talk with Jones to ask him to perform at the junior high school prom. Jones responds by coming to her house later that evening and accepting personally.

Near the end credits, all the Brady children are sitting on the steps and singing the song before Marcia comes home from the prom.

== The Brady Bunch Movie appearance ==
In The Brady Bunch Movie, Marcia Brady introduces Jones at the school prom. Jones gets a huge reception from the teachers (who were young during the height of Jones' career), while the students give him a cold reception (for being "out of touch" with the times). Jones starts singing "Girl", much to the dismay of the students. The band in the background gets a little edgy and starts to back him with the then-popular style of grunge rock. Jones goes along with it and finishes the song to wild applause from the teachers and (having won them over) the students (since the genre of the music fits well with the decade).

The original version of "Girl" can also be heard playing in the background at different points of the movie, most notably the car jack scene. Jones himself also makes an appearance as a judge along with Micky Dolenz and Peter Tork in the talent show scene.

== Availability ==
Due to the fact that it was a poorly received single and was not included on his 1971 album, the original version of "Girl" was hard to find for a long time. It can now, however, be found as a bonus track on the Davy Jones CD and on the soundtrack of A Very Brady Sequel.

The "grunge" version is widely available as part of the soundtrack to The Brady Bunch Movie. This version currently stands as Jones' best selling song on iTunes.

In June 2012, Friday Music issued Davy Jones: The Bell Recordings (1971-72) on compact disc, and also issued a limited-edition green vinyl 45 (on the Bell label, but showing the Friday Music logo) of the original version of "Girl", backed with Jones' biggest single hit, "Rainy Jane". In September 2012 it was issued again on red vinyl.
