= Davy Jones (album) =

Studio album by Davy Jones
- Released: 1971
- Recorded: 1970–1971
- Genre: Bubblegum pop
- Length: 32:26
- Label: Bell

Davy Jones chronology
David Jones (1965)	Davy Jones (1971)	Christmas Jones (1976)

Singles from Davy Jones
- 1. "Rainy Jane"/"Welcome To My Love" Released: May 1971 (UK only); 2. "I Really Love You"/"Sitting In The Apple Tree" Released: September 1971

Professional ratings
Review scores
Source	Rating
AllMusic	3/5 stars

Davy Jones is the second solo studio album by English recording artist and actor Davy Jones. It includes the single, "Rainy Jane", which reached No. 52 on the Billboard Hot 100.

== Charts ==
Davy Jones reached number 205 on Billboard Top Albums chart.

== Track listing ==
=== Original 1971 vinyl issue ===
Side One
No.	Title	Writer(s)	Length
1.	"Road to Love"	Carol Carmichael	2:29
2.	"How About Me"	John Carrington	2:44
3.	"Singin' to the Music"	Danny Janssen	2:23
4.	"Rainy Jane"	Howard Greenfield; Neil Sedaka	2:42
5.	"Look at Me"	David Gates	2:26
6.	"Say It Again"	Carl Simmons; Ed Welch	2:38

Side Two
No.	Title	Writer(s)	Length
7.	"I Really Love You"	Bob Gundry	2:54
8.	"Love Me For a Day"	Tony Rossine	3:00
9.	"Sitting in the Apple Tree"	Douglas Trevor	2:24
10.	"Take My Love"	Gordon Marron; Loren Newkirk; Reid Reilich	3:46
11.	"Pretty Little Girl"	Gloria Sklerov; Harry Lloyd	2:43
12.	"Welcome to My Love"	Steve Goldman	2:20

=== 2012 CD bonus tracks ===
No.	Title	Writer(s)	Notes	Length
13.	"Girl"	Charles Fox; Norman Gimbel	featured in The Brady Bunch episode "Getting Davy Jones" (1971)	2:41
14.	"I'll Believe In You"	James Stover		2:46
15.	"Take My Love" (mono)	Gordon Marron; Loren Newkirk; Reid Reilich		3:02
16.	"Road to Love" (B-side)	Carol Carmichael		2:18
17.	"How About Me" (mono)	John Carrington		2:44
18.	"I Really Love You" (mono)	Bob Gundry		2:57

== Personnel ==
Credits adapted from CD liner notes.

- Davy Jones – vocals

Additional

- Al Capps – arranger, conductor
- Beverly Weinstein – art direction
- Jim O'Connell – album design
- Lenny Roberts – sound engineer
- Norbert Jobst – photography
- Jackie Mills – producer
- Joe Reagoso – producer, remastering, liner notes (2012 CD release)
