= Incredible Revisited =

Incredible!

Studio album by Davy Jones
- Released: 1988
- Genres: New wave; pop rock; soft rock
- Producer: Davy Jones

Davy Jones chronology
Davy Jones Live (1981)	Incredible! (1988)	Live in Tokyo (1999)

Incredible! is the fourth studio album by the English actor and singer Davy Jones, a member of The Monkees.

== Background ==
In the mid to late 1980s, The Monkees made a successful comeback. New material entered the charts, and their back catalogue also sold well; as a consequence, Jones decided to produce a new solo album.

== Production ==
The tracks on the album, and those featured on later expanded reissues, were recorded between February 1986 and July 1987 at Ardent Studios in Memphis, Tennessee; Globe Studio in Sydney, Australia; Longview Farm in North Brookfield, Massachusetts; Luxury Audio Workshop in Las Vegas, Nevada; and the Record Plant in New York City.

It was produced and arranged under Jones' supervision, and co-produced by Mark Clarke, Joe Hardy, and Robert Merrill. Engineering was by Tim Bomba, Bobby Cohen, Joe Henehan, Lee Watters, and Mark Weisinger.

Besides Jones, musicians on the recording included Mark Clarke, members of The Grass Roots, and members of The Monkees' touring band.

== Album cover ==
Incredible's album cover, a parody of a photograph of Jim Morrison, featured a long-haired Jones, pointing to his right at the word "Incredible". Jones' age in the picture suggests it was taken sometime between 1971 and 1986.

== Release and reception ==
The album sold poorly, possibly as a result of poor advertising.

In an interview, Jones stated that "I just plain didn't care to put that much energy into promoting. Perhaps I should have. I just saw it as something to do for personal enjoyment and for the fans. Lord knows I spent enough money producing it. But the '80s were so busy for us. A lot of good things were set aside. My mind was on performing in 41,000 seat stadiums and having Monkees records all over the Top 40."

== Track listing ==
1. "Look Inside Yourself" 03:11
2. "Make the Woman Love Me" 04:34
3. "You're Only Dreaming" 03:14
4. "Black and White" 03:24
5. "Valleri (Incredible Version)" 02:27
6. "After Your Heart" 03:34 (re-recording of the 1981 version)
7. "Don't Go" 03:06
8. "Incredible" 03:58
9. "I'll Love You Forever" 03:47
10. "Hippy Hippy Shake" 02:01
11. "She Believes" 03:40
12. "Hanging by a Thread" 03:47
13. "Don't Go (Single Mix)" 03:11 *
14. "Manchester Boy (1986 Ukulele Version)" 02:16 *
15. "She Believes (Alternate Mix)" 03:46 *
16. "Don't Go (Alternate Mix)" 03:11 *

(* indicates bonus track on Bandcamp version)

== Original release and reissues ==
Four singles were released from Incredible Revisited:

1. "I'll Love You Forever" (originally issued in 1984)
2. "Valleri (Re-recorded 1986)
3. "After Your Heart" (1986)
4. "Don't Go" (1986)

Three of these four singles have been reissued: "I'll Love You Forever" was reissued in 1986, "After Your Heart" was reissued in 1987, and "Don't Go" was reissued in 1989.

In total, Incredible Revisited was released four times under three different titles: Incredible Revisited, Incredible, and Incredible Too!, which had an alternate track list.

Due to poor initial sales, original copies became difficult to find; however in 2010, the album was released on Jones' Bandcamp site.
