= David Jones (album) =

Studio album by Davy Jones
- Released: 1965
- Recorded: 1964–1965
- Genre: Pop
- Length: 26:12
- Label: Colpix
- Producer: Hank Levine

Davy Jones chronology
David Jones (1965)	Davy Jones (1971)

Singles from David Jones
- 1. "Dream Girl" Released: February 1965; 2. "What Are We Going to Do?" / "This Bouquet" Released: July 1965; 3. "Theme For A New Love" Released: October 1965

Professional ratings
Review scores
Source	Rating
AllMusic	1.5/5 stars

David Jones is the debut studio album by English singer Davy Jones. It was released in 1965 by Colpix Records. The album was initially unsuccessful, and did not chart until after Jones became a member of The Monkees.

== Background ==
In September 1964, David Jones, who had played the role of the Artful Dodger in the musical Oliver! on Broadway, signed a long-term contract with Screen Gems, a division of Columbia Pictures. As part of the deal, which covered films, television, and music, Jones was signed to the company's record division, Colpix. In December, Jones recorded his first Colpix single, "Dream Girl" in New York City. The song and its B-side, "Take Me to Paradise", were produced by Jack Lewis and arranged by Charlie Calello. The single was released in February 1965, but failed to chart. "Dream Girl" would appear as the eighth track on Jones' self-titled solo album.

== Recording ==
David Jones was produced by Hank Levine, who had become Colpix's A&R director at the end of May 1965. During the recording of the album, Jones was simultaneously appearing in the musical Pickwick in Los Angeles. Sessions for the album began on 15 June at United Western Recorders in Hollywood, where the backing tracks for "This Bouquet", "Baby It's Me", "A Little You", and "What Are We Going To Do" were recorded. "A Little You" did not appear on the final track listing. On 26 July, the backing tracks for "Theme For A New Love", "My Dad", "Face Up To It", "Maybe It's Because I'm a Londoner", "Put Me Amongst The Girls", "Any Old Iron", and "It Ain't Me Babe" were recorded in two three-hour sessions. Details on additional sessions, including when Jones added his vocals, are unknown.

Smokey Roberds, who co-wrote two tracks on the album, later auditioned for the pilot episode of The Monkees, but was rejected as not being suitable for the project.

== Release ==
Colpix issued "What Are We Going To Do?" as a single in July 1965. The single reached number 93 on the Billboard Hot 100 in August. It also appeared on the Cashbox chart, where it peaked at number 94, and on the Record World chart, where it reached number 77. In October, "Theme for a New Love" was released as the B-side of "The Girl from Chelsea", a non-album single produced by David Gates which failed to chart. Jones promoted both singles on local and national television shows.

In September 1967, Billboard reported "Theme for a New Love" as reaching number 4 in Australia on their Hits of the World chart. Similarly, the magazine listed "Maybe It's Because I'm a Londoner" as charting at number 5 in Denmark. In November, Billboard also reported "Dream Girl" as charting at number 5 in Australia.

The master tapes for Jones' Colpix recordings are lost. Later reissues were sourced from copies of the records.

David Jones was re-released on CD by Friday Music on 27 September 2011.

== Critical reception and legacy ==
Chick Ober of the St. Petersburg Times described David Jones as a "tremendous album" and wrote, "This LP should start off his recording career with a real lift". In a retrospective review of the album, Aaron Badgley of AllMusic wrote, "The music is bland, predictably arranged, and for the most part boring. Jones has a great voice, but it is not enough to salvage this album."

In 1967, the David Jones album appeared in a scene in The Monkees episode "Monkees at the Movies".

== Track listing ==
Side one
No.	Title	Writer(s)	Length
1.	"What Are We Going To Do?"	Henry Levine, Murray MacLeod, Smokey Roberds	2:23
2.	"Maybe It's Because I'm a Londoner"	Hubert Gregg	2:05
3.	"Put Me Amongst The Girls"	Clarence Wainwright Murphy, Dan Lipton	3:26
4.	"Any Old Iron"	Charles Collins, E.A. Sheppard, Fred E. Terry	2:01
5.	"Theme For A New Love"	Berdie Abrams, Hank Levine	2:17

Side two
No.	Title	Writer(s)	Length
1.	"It Ain't Me Babe"	Bob Dylan	2:34
2.	"Face Up To It"	Roger Atkins, Gerry Robinson	2:22
3.	"Dream Girl"	Van McCoy	2:16
4.	"Baby It's Me"	Mark Anthony	2:01
5.	"My Dad"	Barry Mann, Cynthia Weil	2:36
6.	"This Bouquet"	Henry Levine, MacLeod, Roberds	2:08

2011 Friday Music reissue CD bonus tracks
No.	Title	Writer(s)	Notes	Length
12.	"Take Me to Paradise"	Toni Wine, Steve Venet	(Colpix CP 764 B-side, 1965)	2:43
13.	"The Girl From Chelsea"	Gerry Goffin, Carole King	(Colpix CP 789 A-side, 1965)	2:37

== Charts ==
Chart performance for David Jones
Chart (1967)	Peak position
US Billboard Top LPs	185
US Cashbox Album Charts	73
