= Hammerite =

British-Swedish brand of hammer paint

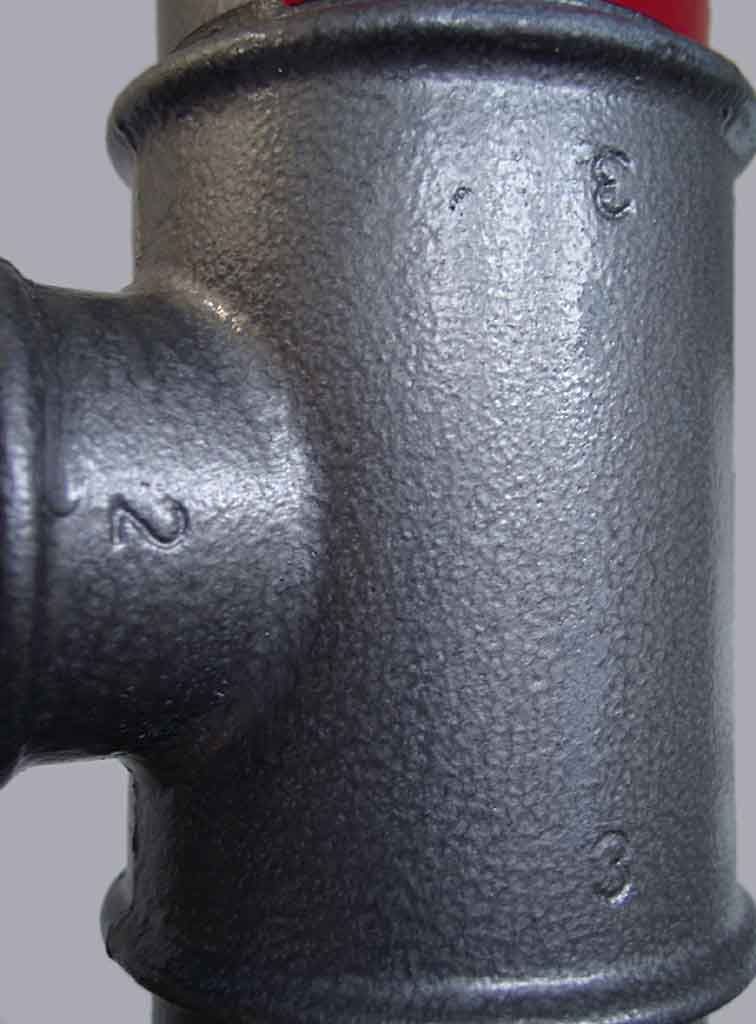
Hammer paint on a pipe

Hammerite is a brand of hammer paint made by Hammerite Products, a subsidiary of AkzoNobel.

== Company history ==
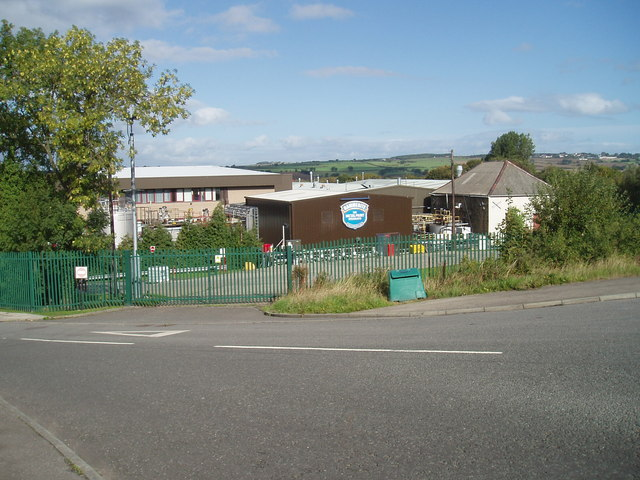
Hammerite paint factory, Prudhoe

Hammerite paint was first developed in 1962 by Allen Forster and later manufactured at the Finnigan's factory in Prudhoe, Northumberland. The company also produced the anti-corrosion treatment Waxoyl. In the early 1980s, the company was acquired by Hunting plc who later sold it on to Williams Holdings in 1993. Imperial Chemical Industries (ICI) acquired the company from Williams Holdings in 1998. In 2008, ICI was acquired by AkzoNobel.

== Products ==
Hammerite products includes rust prevention and restoration paint, and are based on zinc phosphate as the active ingredient. Their products include interior and exterior paints as well as special metal primers. Many of these paints feature a hammered look, hence the name of the company.
