= Rainy Jane =

Single by Neil Sedaka
- B-side: "Jeannine"
- Released: 1969
- Genre: Pop
- Label: SGC; Atlantic
- Songwriters: Neil Sedaka; Howard Greenfield
- Producers: Neil Sedaka; Howard Greenfield

Neil Sedaka singles chronology
"We Can Make It If We Try" (1966)	"Rainy Jane" (1969)	"Beautiful You" (1971)

"Rainy Jane"

Single by Davy Jones

from the album Davy Jones
- B-side: "Welcome to My Love"
- Released: June 1971
- Genre: Pop
- Label: Bell
- Songwriters: Neil Sedaka; Howard Greenfield

Davy Jones singles chronology
"Do It in the Name of Love" (1971)	"Rainy Jane" (1971)	"I Really Love You" (1971)

"Rainy Jane" is a song co-written and originally recorded by American singer, songwriter and pianist Neil Sedaka in 1969, covered two years later by English actor, singer, and songwriter Davy Jones. Sedaka's rendition became a minor hit in the US, Canada and Australia.

== Davy Jones version ==
Former Monkees lead singer Davy Jones covered "Rainy Jane" in 1971 on his second album, Davy Jones (1971). He achieved a medium hit with the song that summer in the US (No. 52 Billboard Hot 100, No. 32 Cash Box Top 100) and a substantially larger hit in Canada (No. 14 Pop, No. 21 Adult Contemporary).

== Charts ==
Neil Sedaka

Chart (1969)	Peak position
Australia (Kent Music Report)	78
Canada Top Singles (RPM)	78
US Cash Box Top 100	131

Davy Jones cover

Chart (1971)	Peak position
Australia (Kent Music Report)	78
Canada Top Singles (RPM)	14
Canada Adult Contemporary (RPM)	21
US Billboard Hot 100	52
US Cash Box Top 100	32
