= Just Me (Davy Jones album) =

Studio album by Davy Jones
- Released: 2001
- Recorded: 1990–2001
- Genres: Rock, pop, teen pop
- Label: Fire Inside

Davy Jones chronology
Live in Tokyo (1999)	Just Me (2001)	Daydream Believin: Hits & Rarities (2004)

Professional ratings
Review scores
Source	Rating
AllMusic	4/5 stars

Just Me is the fifth studio album by British singer/actor Davy Jones. It was released in 2001 by Fire Inside Records.

== Background and history ==
In the early 1990s, Jones started working on "Just Me". He had been writing all of these songs by himself, and some would later be released on the Monkees reunion album Justus ("It's Not Too Late" and "What A Night"). The tracks were recorded in various studios around Central PA, where Jones' summer home was located.

== Track listing ==
1. "Hold Me Tight"
2. "When You Tell Me That You Love Me"
3. "I Wanna Be Me"
4. "My Love (She Means Everything)"
5. "Hurry Up Slow Down"
6. "It's Not Too Late"
7. "I'm Still in Love with You"
8. "If Only for One Moment"
9. "What a Night"
10. "So Goes Love"
11. "I Ain't Gonna Love You No More"
12. "I'm Still in Love with You (Reprise)/Intro/Hold Me Tight"

== Reception ==
Aaron Badgley of AllMusic described the album as "by far [Davy's] best release, and one that deserves to be heard."
