= Davy Jones (musician) =

British musician (1945–2012)

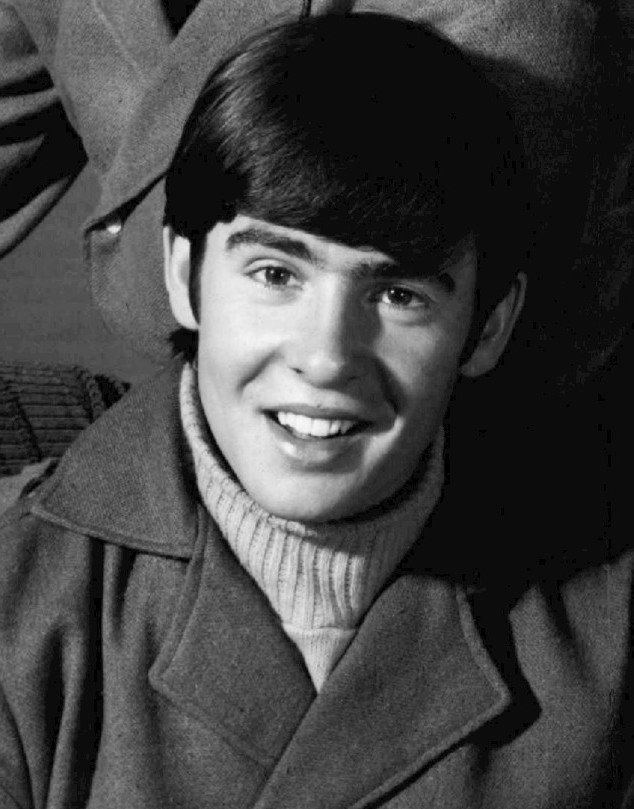
- Jones at a 1966 Monkees photoshoot
- Born: David Thomas Jones; 30 December 1945; Openshaw, Manchester, England
- Died: 29 February 2012 (aged 66); Stuart, Florida, US
- Occupations: Musician; actor; businessman; jockey
- Years active: 1961–2012
- Spouses: Dixie Linda Haines (m. 1967; div. 1975); Anita Pollinger (m. 1981; div. 1996); Jessica Pacheco (m. 2009)
- Children: 4
- Musical career
- Genres: Rock; pop; pop rock; sunshine pop; psychedelic rock; music hall
- Instruments: Vocals; guitar; drums
- Labels: Colpix; Bell; 7A
- Formerly of: The Monkees; Dolenz, Jones, Boyce & Hart
- Website: davyjones.net

David Thomas "Davy" Jones (30 December 1945 – 29 February 2012) was an English musician and actor. Best known as a member of the American pop rock band the Monkees and a co-star of the TV series The Monkees (1966–1968), Jones was considered a teen idol.

Aside from his work on The Monkees TV show, Jones' acting credits included a Tony-nominated performance as the Artful Dodger in the original London and Broadway productions of Oliver! and a guest-starring role in a notable episode of The Brady Bunch television show and a later reprised parody film.

== Early life ==
David Thomas Jones was born on 30 December 1945 in Manchester, England, to Harry and Doris Jones. He had three sisters, Hazel, Linda and Beryl. Jones' mother died from emphysema when he was 14 years of age.

== Career as actor and singer ==
=== Early days (1961–1965) ===
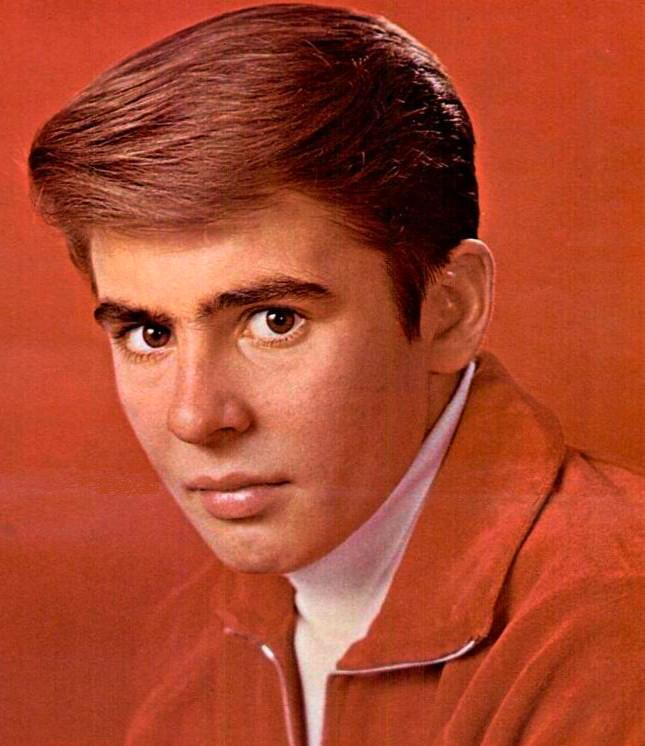
Jones in a 1965 ad for his Colpix single "What Are We Going to Do?"

Jones' television acting debut was in the British television soap opera Coronation Street, in which he appeared as Colin Lomax, grandson of the regular character Ena Sharples, for one episode on 6 March 1961. He also appeared in the BBC police series Z-Cars. Following the death of his mother, Jones rejected acting in favour of becoming a jockey, commencing an apprenticeship with Newmarket trainer Basil Foster. He dropped out of secondary school to begin working in that field, but this career was short-lived. Even though Foster believed Jones would be successful as a jockey, he encouraged his young protégé to take a role as the Artful Dodger in a production of Oliver! in London's West End. When approached by a friend who worked in a West End theatre during the show's casting, Foster replied, "I've got the kid." Jones' portrayal brought him great acclaim. He played the role in London and then on Broadway, and was nominated for a Tony Award.

On 9 February 1964, Jones appeared on The Ed Sullivan Show with Georgia Brown, who was playing Nancy in the Broadway production of Oliver!. It was the episode of the show in which the Beatles made their first appearance on American television. That night, Jones said, "I watched the Beatles from the side of the stage, I saw the girls going crazy, and I said to myself, this is it, I want a piece of that." Jones also appeared with Georgia Brown on the Merv Griffin Show around the same time.

Following his Ed Sullivan appearance, Jones signed a contract with Ward Sylvester of Screen Gems (at that time the television division of Columbia Pictures). A pair of American television appearances followed, as Jones received screen time in episodes of Ben Casey and The Farmer's Daughter.

Jones debuted on the Billboard Hot 100 in the week of 14 August 1965, with the single "What Are We Going To Do?", which peaked at number 93. The 19-year-old singer was signed to Colpix Records, a label owned by Columbia. His debut album, David Jones, on the same label, followed soon afterward (CP493).

=== The Monkees (1966–1970) ===
From 1966 to 1970, Jones was a member of the Monkees, a pop-rock band formed expressly for a television show of the same name. With Screen Gems producing the series, Jones was shortlisted for auditions, as he was the only Monkee who was signed to a deal with the studio, but he still had to meet the standards of producers Bob Rafelson and Bert Schneider. Jones sang lead vocals on many of the Monkees' recordings, including "I Wanna Be Free" and "Daydream Believer". The DVD release of the first season of the show contained commentary from the various bandmates. In Peter Tork's commentary, he stated that Jones was a good drummer and had the live performance line-up been based solely on playing ability, it ought to have been Tork on guitar, Mike Nesmith on bass, and Jones on drums, with Micky Dolenz taking the fronting role, rather than as it was done (with Nesmith on guitar, Tork on bass, and Dolenz on drums). Like Peter Tork, Jones, despite playing mostly tambourine or maracas, was a multi-instrumentalist and would fill in for Tork on bass when he played keyboards and vice versa and for Dolenz on drums when the Monkees performed live concerts.

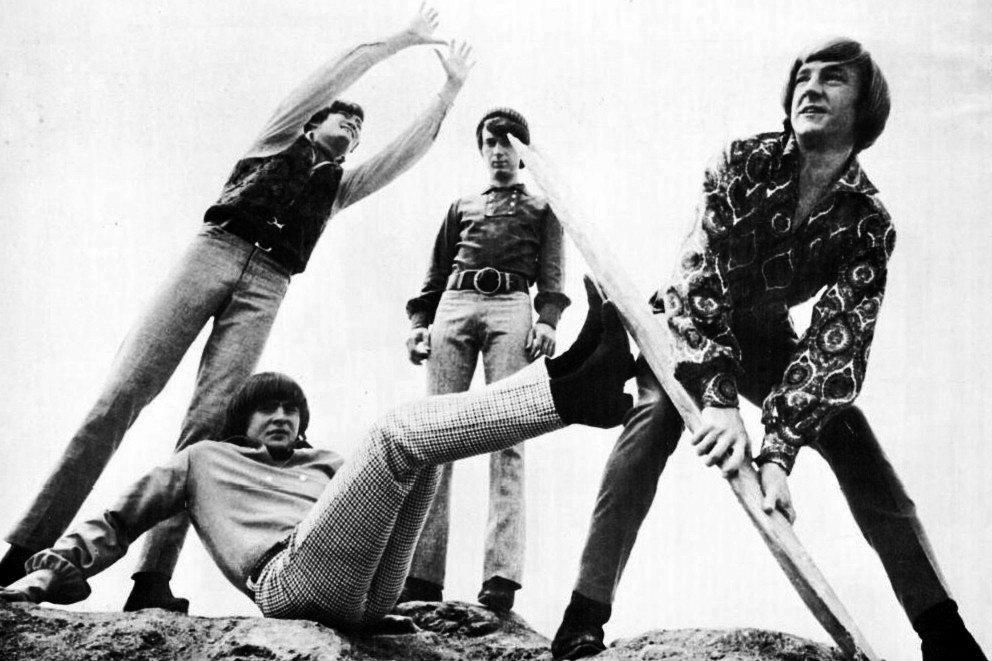
Early photo of the Monkees

The Monkees officially disbanded in 1970. The NBC television series The Monkees was popular and remained in syndication.

=== Post-Monkees career (1970–2012) ===
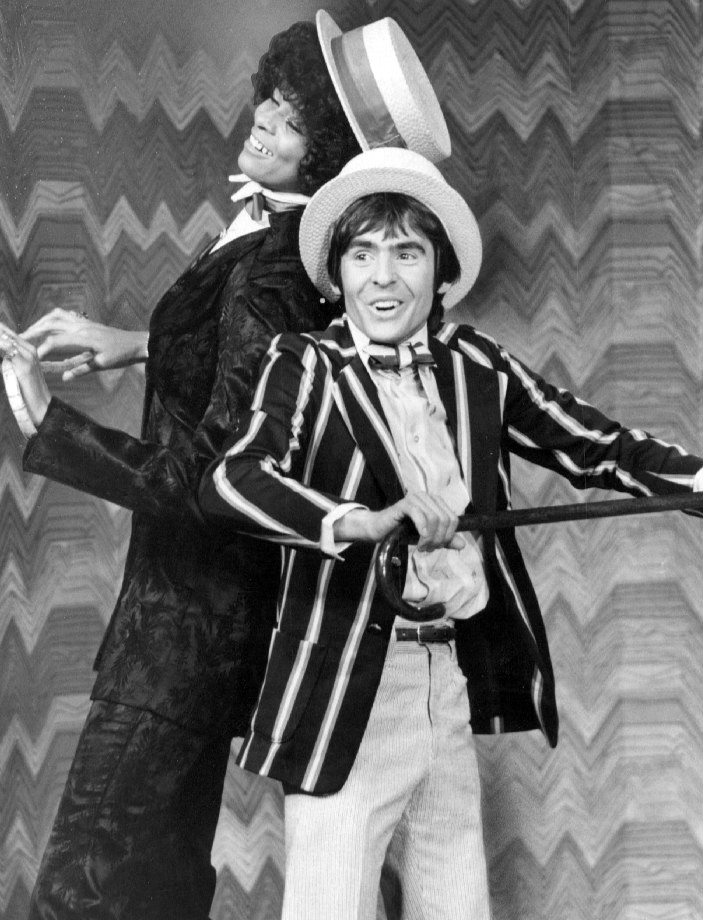
Ilene Anderson of "Sunday's Child" with Jones in the 1972 ABC special Pop! Goes Davy Jones

Bell Records, then having a string of hits with The Partridge Family, signed Jones to a somewhat inflexible solo record contract in 1971. Jones was not allowed to choose his songs or producer, resulting in several lacklustre and aimless records. His second solo album, Davy Jones (1971) was notable for the song "Rainy Jane", which reached No. 52 in the Billboard charts. To promote the album, Jones performed "Girl" on an episode of The Brady Bunch entitled "Getting Davy Jones". Although the single sold poorly, the popularity of Jones' appearance on the show resulted in "Girl" becoming his best-remembered solo hit, even though it was not included in the album. The final single, "I'll Believe In You"/"Road to Love", was poorly received.

==== Dolenz, Jones, Boyce & Hart (1976) ====
Thanks in part to reruns of The Monkees on Saturday mornings and in syndication, The Monkees Greatest Hits charted in 1976. The LP, issued by Arista (a subsidiary of Screen Gems), was actually a repackaging of a 1972 compilation LP called Refocus that had been issued by Arista's previous label imprint, Bell Records, also owned by Screen Gems.

Dolenz and Jones took advantage of this, joining ex-Monkees songwriters Tommy Boyce and Bobby Hart to tour the United States. From 1975 to 1977, as the "Golden Hits of The Monkees" show ("The Guys who Wrote 'Em and the Guys who Sang 'Em!"), they successfully performed in smaller venues such as state fairs and amusement parks as well as making stops in Japan, Thailand, and Singapore (although they were forbidden from using the "Monkees" name, as it was owned by Screen Gems at the time). They also released an album of new material appropriately as Dolenz, Jones, Boyce & Hart; a live album entitled Concert in Japan was also recorded in 1976, but it was not released until 1996.

==== Further stage and screen appearances (1977–1999) ====
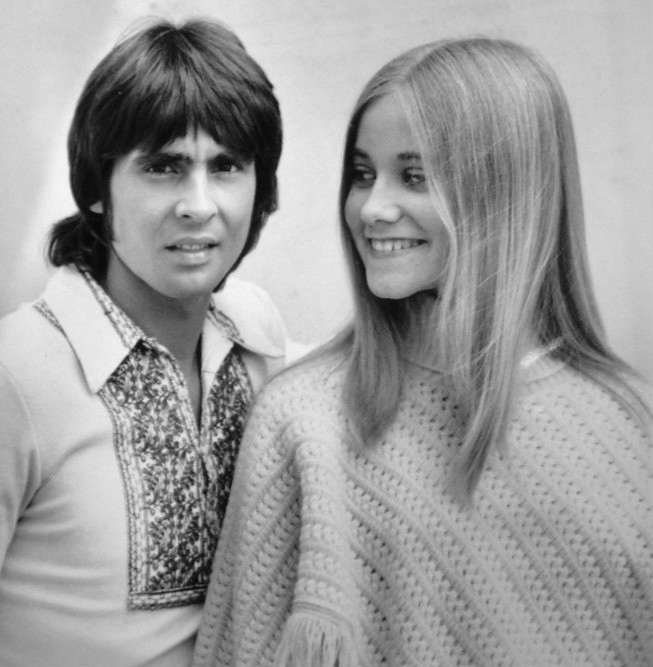
Jones with Maureen McCormick in the 1971 The Brady Bunch episode "Getting Davy Jones", in which he was a guest star

Despite his initial high profile after the Monkees disbanded, Jones struggled to establish himself as a solo music artist. Glenn A. Baker, author of Monkeemania: The True Story of the Monkees, commented in 1986 that "for an artist as versatile and confident as (Davy) Jones, the relative failure of his post-Monkees activities is puzzling. For all his cocky predictions to the press about his future plans, Davy fell into a directionless heap when left to his own devices."

Jones returned to theatre several times after the Monkees disbanded. In 1977, he performed with former bandmate Micky Dolenz in a stage production of the Harry Nilsson musical The Point! in London at the Mermaid Theatre, playing and singing the starring role of "Oblio" to Dolenz' roles as the "Count's Kid" and the "Leafman", (according to the CD booklet). An original cast recording was made and released. The comedic chemistry of Jones and Dolenz proved so strong that the show was revived in 1978 with Nilsson inserting additional comedy for the two, plus two more songs, with one of them ("Gotta Get Up") being sung by Jones and Dolenz. The show was considered so good that it was planned to be revived again in 1979 but it proved cost prohibitive (source CD booklet "Harry Nilsson's The Point"). Jones also appeared in several productions of Oliver! as the Artful Dodger, and in 1989 toured the US portraying "Fagin".

Jones appeared in two episodes each of Love, American Style and My Two Dads. Jones also appeared in animated form as himself in 1972 in an hour-long episode of The New Scooby-Doo Movies.

A Monkees television show marathon ("Pleasant Valley Sunday") broadcast on 23 February 1986 by MTV resulted in a wave of Monkeemania not seen since the band's heyday. Jones reunited with Dolenz and Peter Tork from 1986 to 1989 to celebrate the band's renewed success and promote the 20th anniversary of the band. A new top 20 hit, "That Was Then, This Is Now" was released (though Jones did not perform on the song) as well as an album, Pool It!

In 1996, Jones reunited with Dolenz, Tork and Michael Nesmith to celebrate the 30th anniversary of the Monkees. The band released a new album entitled Justus, the first album since 1967's Headquarters that featured the band members performing all instrumental duties. It was the last time all four Monkees performed together.

Other television appearances include Sledge Hammer!, Boy Meets World, Hey Arnold!, The Single Guy (where he is mistaken for Dudley Moore) and Sabrina, the Teenage Witch in which he sang "Daydream Believer" to Sabrina Spellman (played by Melissa Joan Hart) as well as (I'll) Love You Forever. In 1995, Jones acted in a notable episode of the sitcom Boy Meets World.

The continued popularity of Jones' 1971 Brady Bunch appearance led to his being cast as himself in The Brady Bunch Movie (1995). Jones sang his signature solo hit "Girl", with a grunge band providing backing, this time with middle-aged women swooning over him. Micky Dolenz and Peter Tork also appeared alongside Jones as judges.

On 2 August 1996, while The Monkees were on their 30th-anniversary tour in New England, Jones was interviewed on the "Sports Break" radio show on WBPS 890-AM in Boston by host Roland Regan about his early days as a jockey and amateur boxer back in England as a youth, and now how he stays in shape by jogging and playing in celebrity tennis tournaments.

On 21 June 1997, during a concert at the Los Angeles Coliseum, Jones joined U2's the Edge onstage for a karaoke performance of "Daydream Believer", which had become a fixture of the band's set during that year's PopMart Tour.

==== Later career (2000–2012) ====
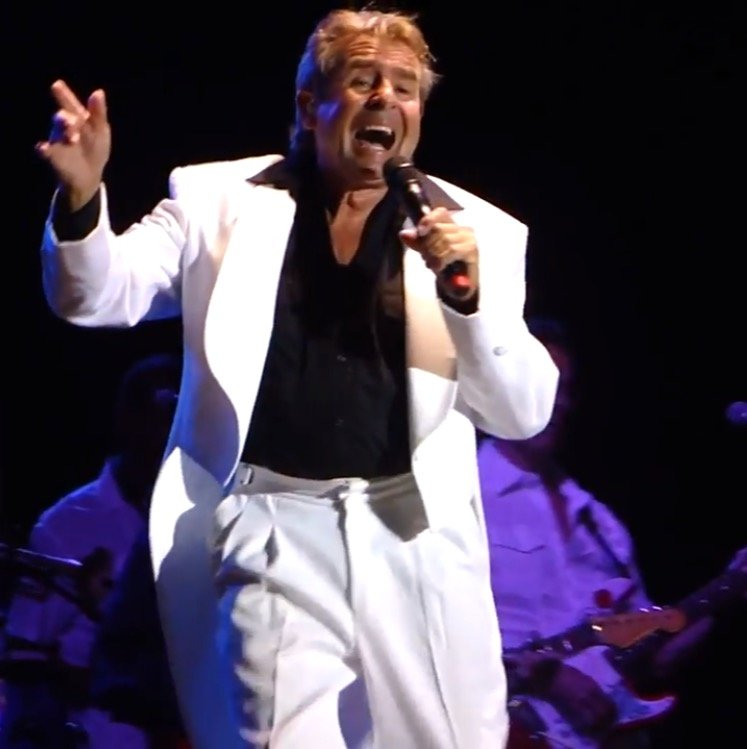
Jones performing in 2011

In 2001, Jones released Just Me, an album of his own songs, some written for the album and others originally on Monkees releases. In the early 2000s he was performing in the Flower Power Concert Series during Epcot's Flower and Garden Festival, a yearly gig he would continue until his death.

In April 2006, Jones recorded the single "Your Personal Penguin", written by children's author Sandra Boynton, as a companion piece to her new board book of the same title.

In 2007, Jones performed the theme song for the film Sexina: Popstar P.I.. On 1 November 2007, the Boynton book and CD titled Blue Moo was released and Jones is featured in both the book and CD, singing "Your Personal Penguin". In 2009, Jones released a collection of classics and standards from the 1940s through the 1970s entitled She.

In December 2008, Yahoo! Music named Jones the "Number 1 teen idol of all time". In 2009, Jones was rated second in a list of 10 best teen idols compiled by Fox News.

In 2009, Jones made a cameo appearance as himself in the SpongeBob SquarePants episode "SpongeBob SquarePants vs. The Big One" (his appearance was meant as a pun on the phrase "Davy Jones' Locker").

In February 2011, Jones confirmed rumours of another Monkees reunion. "There's even talk of putting the Monkees back together again in the next year or so for a U.S. and UK tour," he told Disney's Backstage Pass newsletter. "You're always hearing all those great songs on the radio, in commercials, movies, almost everywhere." The tour (Jones' last with the Monkees) came to fruition and was entitled An Evening with The Monkees: The 45th Anniversary Tour.

On 12 February 2012, Jones played a set at B.B. King Blues Club & Grill in New York City, and on 19 February 2012, he made his final public performance in Thackerville, Oklahoma.

== Other ventures ==
In 1967, Jones opened his first store, called Zilch, at 217 Thompson Street in the Greenwich Village section of New York City. The store sold "hip" clothing and accessories, and also allowed customers to design their own clothes.

After the Monkees disbanded in 1970, Jones kept himself busy by establishing a New York City-style street market in Los Angeles, called "The Street", which cost approximately $40,000. He also collaborated with musical director Doug Trevor on a one-hour ABC television special titled Pop Goes Davy Jones, which featured new artists The Jackson 5 and the Osmonds.

=== Horse racing ===
In addition to his career as an entertainer, Jones' other great love was horses. Having trained as a jockey in his teens in the UK, he had at first intended to pursue a career as a professional race jockey. He held an amateur rider's licence, and rode in his first race at Newbury in Berkshire for renowned trainer Toby Balding.

On 1 February 1996, Jones won his first race, on Digpast, in the one-mile Ontario Amateur Riders Handicap at Lingfield Park, Surrey. Jones also had horse ownership interests in both the US and the UK, and served as a commercial spokesman for Colonial Downs racetrack in Virginia. Following Jones' death, Lingfield announced that the first two races on the racecard for 3 March 2012 would be renamed the "Hey Hey We're the Monkees Handicap" and the "In Memory of Davy Jones Selling Stakes", with successful horses in those races led into the winners' enclosure while some of the Monkees' biggest hits are played. Plans were also announced to erect a plaque to commemorate Jones next to a monkey puzzle tree on the course.

== Personal life ==
Jones was married three times and had four children. In December 1967, he married Dixie Linda Haines, with whom he had been living. Their relationship had been kept out of the public eye until after the birth of their first child. It caused a considerable backlash for Jones from his fans when it was finally made public. Jones later stated in Tiger Beat magazine, "I kept my marriage a secret because I believe stars should be allowed a private life." Jones and Haines had two daughters. The marriage ended in 1975.

Jones married his second wife, Anita Pollinger, on 24 January 1981, and also had two daughters. The couple divorced in 1996 during the Monkees' 30th anniversary reunion tour.

Jones married Jessica Pacheco in 2009. Jones and his wife appeared on the Dr. Phil show in April 2011. On 28 July 2011, Pacheco filed to divorce Jones in Florida, but dropped the suit in October. They were still married when he died in February 2012. Pacheco was omitted from Jones' will, which he had made before their marriage. His eldest daughter, whom he named his executor, was granted by the court the unusual request that her father's will be sealed, on the basis that "public opinion could have a material effect on his copyrights, royalties, and ongoing goodwill".

== Death ==
On the morning of 29 February 2012, Jones went to tend his 14 horses at a farm in Indiantown, Florida. After riding one of his favourite horses around the track, he complained of chest pains and difficulty breathing and was given antacid pills. Just after 8:00 a.m., a ranch-hand found Jones unconscious in his car; an ambulance was called but he could not be revived. He was taken to Martin Memorial South Hospital in Stuart, Florida, where he died at the age of 66 from a heart attack resulting from arteriosclerosis.

On 7 March, a private funeral service was held at Holy Cross Catholic parish church in Indiantown. To avoid drawing attention from the grieving family, the three surviving Monkees did not attend. Instead, the bandmates attended memorial services in New York City and organised their own private memorial in Los Angeles along with Jones' family and close friends. A public memorial service was held on 10 March in Beavertown, Pennsylvania, his home town for the last 26 years of his life, near a church Jones had purchased for future renovation.

On 12 March, a private memorial service was held in Jones' hometown of Openshaw, Manchester, at Lees Street Congregational Church, where Jones performed as a child in church plays. Jones' wife and daughters travelled to England to join his relatives based there for the service, and placed his ashes on his parents' graves for a time.

=== Reaction ===
"For me, David was the Monkees. They were his band. We were just his side men."

— Michael Nesmith

The news of Jones' death triggered a surge of Internet traffic, causing sales of the Monkees' music to increase dramatically.

Guitarist Michael Nesmith stated that Jones' "spirit and soul live well in my heart, among all the lovely people, who remember with me the good times, and the healing times, that were created for so many, including us. I have fond memories. I wish him safe travels." In an 8 March 2012 interview with Rolling Stone magazine, Nesmith commented, "For me, David was the Monkees. They were his band. We were his side men." Bassist Peter Tork said, "Adios to the Manchester Cowboy", and speaking to CNN, drummer/singer Micky Dolenz said, "He was the brother I never had and this leaves a gigantic hole in my heart." Dolenz claimed that he knew that something bad was about to happen and said "Can't believe it ... Still in shock ... had bad dreams all night long." Dolenz was gratified by the public affection expressed for both Jones and the Monkees in the wake of his bandmate's death. "He was a very well-known and well-loved character and person. There are a lot of people who are grieving pretty hard. The Monkees obviously had a following, and so did (Jones) on his own. So I'm not surprised, but I was flattered and honored to be considered one of his friends and a cohort in Monkee business."

The Monkees co-creator Bob Rafelson commented that Jones "deserves a lot of credit, let me tell you. He may not have lived as long as we wanted him to, but he survived about seven lifetimes, including being perhaps the biggest rock star of his time."

Brady Bunch co-star Maureen McCormick commented that "Davy was a beautiful soul," and that he "spread love and goodness around the world. He filled our lives with happiness, music, and joy. He will live on in our hearts forever. May he rest in peace."

Yahoo Music commented that Jones' death "hit so many people so hard" because "Monkees nostalgia cuts across generations: from the people who discovered the band during their original 1960s run; to the kids who came of age watching 1970s reruns; to the 20- and 30-somethings who discovered the Monkees when MTV (a network that owes much to the Monkees' influence) began airing old episodes in 1986."

Time contributor James Poniewozik praised the Monkees' classic sitcom, and Jones in particular, saying, "even if the show never meant to be more than entertainment and a hit-single generator, we shouldn't sell The Monkees short. It was far better television than it had to be; during an era of formulaic domestic sitcoms and wacky comedies, it was a stylistically ambitious show, with a distinctive visual style, absurdist sense of humor and unusual story structure. Whatever Jones and the Monkees were meant to be, they became creative artists in their own right, and Jones' chipper Brit-pop presence was a big reason they were able to produce work that was commercial, wholesome, and yet impressively weird."

Mediaite columnist Paul Levinson noted, "The Monkees were the first example of something created in a medium – in this case, a rock band on television – that jumped off the screen to have big impact in the real world."

== Filmography ==
Film
Year	Title	Role	Notes
1968	Head	Davy	Credited as David Jones
1971	Lollipops, Roses and Talangka	Davy	Credited as David Jones. Sings Monkees-era tune "French Song"
1973	Treasure Island	Jim Hawkins	Voice
1974	Oliver Twist	The Artful Dodger	Voice
1995	The Brady Bunch Movie	Himself	
2004	The J-K Conspiracy	Himself	
2007	Sexina	Singer	Alternative title: Sexina: Popstar P.I.
2011	Goldberg P.I.	Davy Jones	Alternative title: Jackie Goldberg Private Dick

Television
Year	Title	Role	Notes
1960	BBC Sunday-Night Play		Episode: "Summer Theatre: June Evening"
1961	Coronation Street	Colin Lomax	Episode #1.25; Credited as David Jones
1962	Z-Cars	Various roles	3 episodes Credited as David Jones
1964	The Ed Sullivan Show	Cast of Oliver!	Appeared on same episode as The Beatles on 9 February 1964
1965	Ben Casey	Gregg Carter	Episode: "If You Play Your Cards Right, You Too Can Be a Loser"; Credited as David Jones
1966	The Farmer's Daughter	Roland	Episode: "Moe Hill and the Mountains"; Credited as David Jones
1966–1968	The Monkees	Davy	58 episodes Credited as David Jones
1969	Rowan & Martin's Laugh-In	Guest performer	Episodes #2.19, 3.11
1970	Make Room for Granddaddy	Himself	Episode: "The Teen Idol"
1970–1973	Love, American Style	Various roles	2 episodes
1971	The Brady Bunch	Davy Jones	Episode: "Getting Davy Jones"; Credited as David Jones
1972	The New Scooby-Doo Movies	Himself	Voice, Episode: "The Haunted Horseman in Hagglethorn Hall"
1972	Pop! Goes Davy Jones	Himself, host	ABC musical special
1977	The Wonderful World of Disney	Davey Sanders	Episode: "The Bluegrass Special"
1979	Horse in the House	Frank Tyson	2 episodes
1986	New Love, American Style		Episode: "Love-a-Gram/Love and the Apartment"
1988	Sledge Hammer!	Jerry Vicuna	Episode: "Sledge, Rattle 'n' Roll"
1988–1989	My Two Dads	Malcolm O'Dell	2 episodes
1991	ABC Afterschool Special	Albert Lynch	Episode: "It's Only Rock & Roll"
1991	Trainer	Steve Moorcroft	Episode: "No Way to Treat a Lady"
1992	Herman's Head	Himself	Episode: "The One Where They Go on the Love Boat"
1995	Boy Meets World	Reg, Reginald Fairfield!	Episode: "Rave On"
1996	Lush Life	Johnny James	Episode: "The Not So Lush Rock Star"
1996	The Single Guy	Himself	Episode: "Davy Jones"
1997	Sabrina, the Teenage Witch	Himself	Episode: "Dante's Inferno"
2002	Hey Arnold!	Himself	Voice, Episode: "Gerald's Game/Fishing Trip"
2006	Extreme Makeover: Home Edition	Himself	Episode: "The Craft Family (#3.34)"
2008	Best of the 60s	Himself	One of the PBS "My Music Presents" programs
2009	SpongeBob SquarePants	Himself	Episode: "SpongeBob SquarePants vs. The Big One"
2011	The Dreamsters: Welcome to the Dreamery	Davy Jones	Television movie
2011	Phineas and Ferb	Nigel	Voice, Episode: "Meatloaf Surprise"

== Discography ==
=== Solo studio albums ===
- David Jones (1965)
- Davy Jones (1971)
- The Point (1978)
- Incredible Revisited (1988)
- It's Christmas Time Again (1991)
- Just Me (2001)
- Just Me 2 (2004)
- She (2009)

== Books ==
- They Made a Monkee Out of Me, autobiography (print book) by Davy Jones, Dome PR, 1987, ISBN 978-0-9618614-0-7.
- They Made a Monkee Out of Me: Davy Jones Reads His Autobiography, (audiobook), Dove Entertainment Inc (November 1988).
- Mutant Monkees Meet the Masters of the Multimedia Manipulation Machine! Written with Alan Green, Click! Publishing, First Edition, 1992, (softcover) ISBN 0-9631235-0-5
- Daydream Believin, Hercules Promotions, First Edition, ISBN 0-9618614-1-X (2000)
