= William Rose (illustrator) =

American illustrator of film posters (1909–1972)

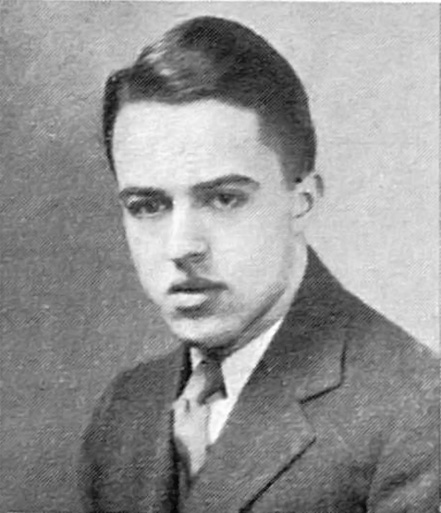
- Rose as a college senior, 1930
- Born: William Frank Rose; September 16, 1909; Pittsburgh, Pennsylvania, U.S.
- Died: May 29, 1972 (aged 62); New York City, U.S.
- Education: University of Pittsburgh; Carnegie Institute (Carnegie Mellon University) College of Fine Arts
- Occupations: Illustrator of film posters, magazines, and paperbacks
- Spouse: Miriam Roberts Rose (m. 1935; died 1964)
- Children: 2

Signature
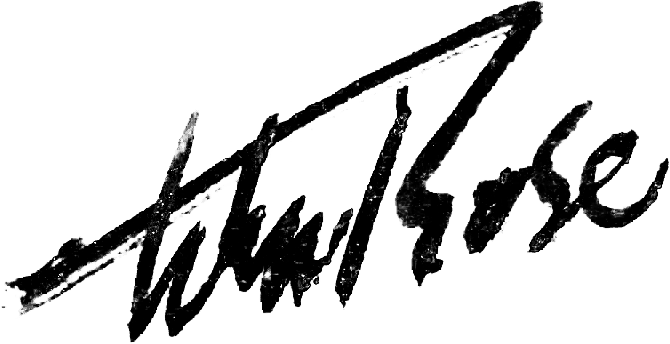

William F. Rose (September 16, 1909 – May 29, 1972) was an American illustrator and film poster artist active in the 1930s and 1940s. He is recognized as one of the most distinctive poster artists of the Classical Hollywood era, a time when most film posters featured painted illustrations rather than photography. Rose painted dozens of poster illustrations for RKO Radio Pictures and other studios. As one of the leading designers in RKO's art department, he helped to define the studio's bold visual aesthetic. Although he was prolific, only a fraction of his poster designs have been individually attributed to him. Most of his output remains unidentified. His artwork is prized by collectors, and original prints of his posters have fetched high prices at auction.

One of his most iconic posters is the alternate "Style B" design for Citizen Kane (1941), which pitched the film as a more conventional romance than it actually was. The poster failed as a marketing ploy but, in hindsight, has been considered superior to the primary "Style A" design. In posters for films like Out of the Past (1947), Rose made significant contributions to the film noir aesthetic. He also illustrated all the promotional artwork for producer Val Lewton's series of low-budget B movies at RKO, most notably the horror film Cat People (1942).

Apart from his work for Hollywood art departments, Rose was also an active illustrator for magazines and paperback fiction. Born and educated in Pittsburgh, Rose resided in Oceanside, New York for most of his professional career. He was married to Miriam Roberts Rose, a pianist, and had two children. In 1972, he died in New York City at the age of 62.

== Early life and education ==
William Frank Rose was born on September 16, 1909, in Pittsburgh, Pennsylvania. He studied at the University of Pittsburgh and the College of Fine Arts at the Carnegie Institute. At Carnegie, he was an editor of student publications and a member of the Jewish fraternity Beta Sigma Rho; he graduated in 1930 with a B.A. in painting and decorating.

== Career and artwork ==
Rose lived and worked in the New York metropolitan area, residing in the suburban hamlet of Oceanside on Long Island. He was a member of the New York-based professional Society of Illustrators, which featured his artwork in its 1945 and 1946 annual exhibitions. His artwork was also displayed at the 1966 Pennsylvania Academy of the Fine Arts annual exhibition.

The majority of Rose's output consisted of illustrations for movie posters, paperback books, and magazines; his contributions to poster art remain his best-remembered work. He produced book cover art for such paperback publishers as Avon, Cardinal Edition, Dell, Permabooks, Pocket Books, Pyramid Books, and Ace Books. His magazine work, to the extent it is known, included illustrations for such publications as The American Magazine, Collier's, Cosmopolitan, Redbook, Today's Woman, Woman, Woman's Day, and the nationally syndicated Sunday magazines This Week and The American Weekly.

=== Film posters ===
According to film historians Stephen Rebello and Richard C. Allen, Rose was "[o]ne of Hollywood's busiest and best posterists". He was closely identified with RKO Radio Pictures, where he worked in-house for many years. His artwork shaped the "colorful and brash" direction taken by the studio's advertising department. He mostly painted in pastel and watercolor, which were the media typically used in the RKO art department. Aside from RKO, he contributed artwork to Paramount Pictures and Metro-Goldwyn-Mayer (MGM).

Most of his poster work was in the 1930s and 1940s, during the Classic Hollywood era and the peak of the studio system. At that time, most poster artists worked for studio art departments and, as a result, most of these artists' individual contributions went unrecognized; many iconic posters of the period are considered anonymous works. Rose is considered one of the rare poster artists of the period whose individual style has achieved recognition, alongside others like Al Hirschfeld, Alberto Vargas, and Reynold Brown. In 2003, the American Film Institute ranked his alternate poster for Citizen Kane (1941) at no. 36 on its "100 Years... 100 American Movie Poster Classics" list.

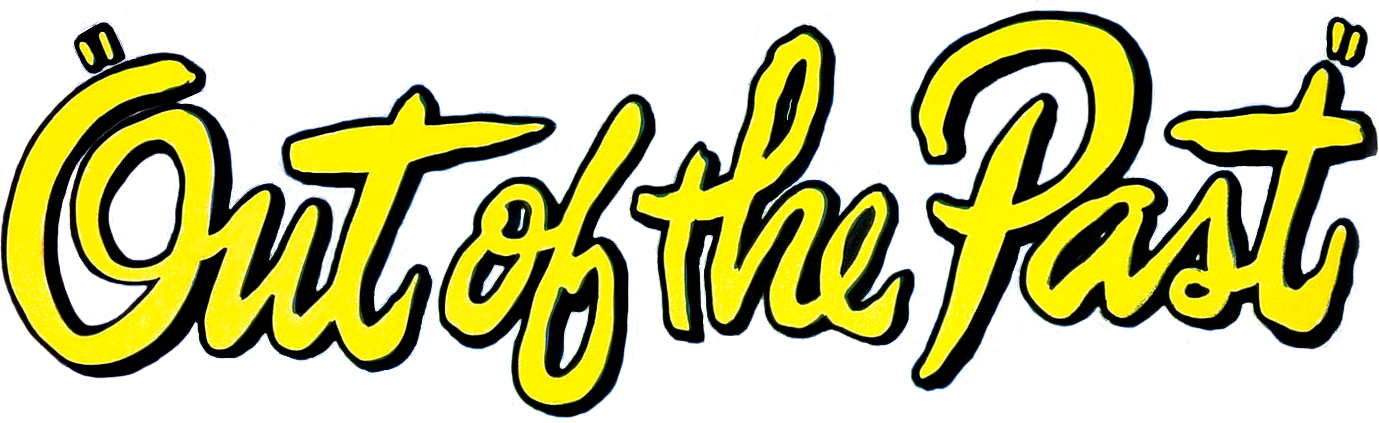

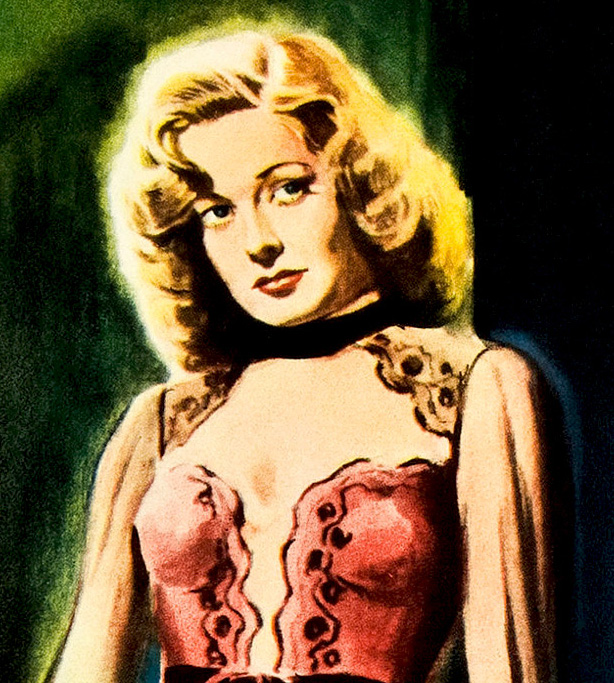
Jane Greer
as Kathie Moffat

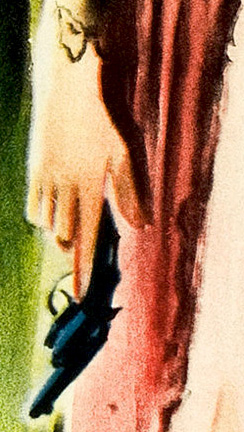
Moffat's revolver

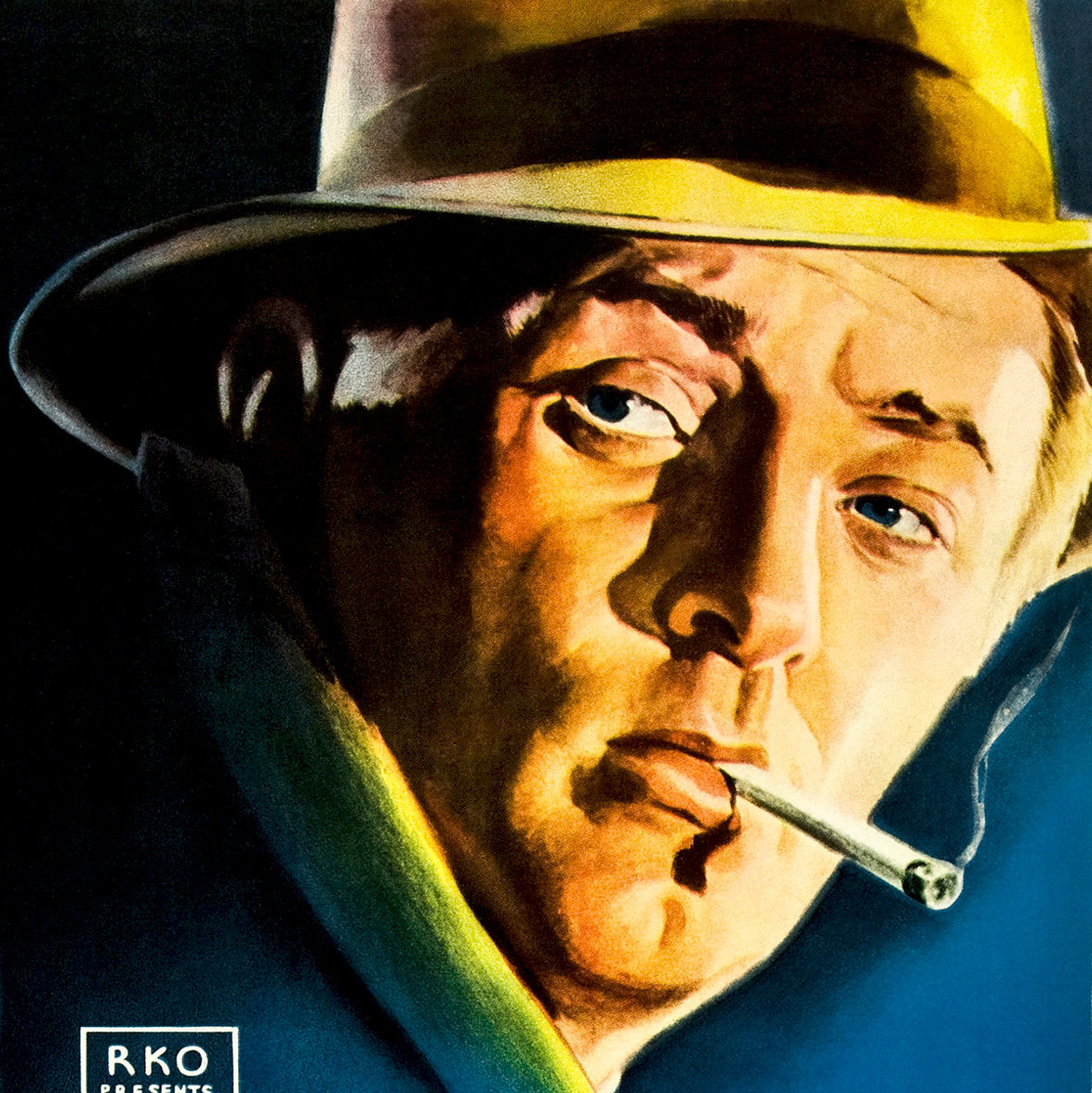
Robert Mitchum
as Jeff Bailey

Details from the noir-style poster for Out of the Past (1947). Rose painted Mitchum as a weary detective with a cigarette hanging from his mouth and Greer as an alluring femme fatale holding a revolver in a delicate, ambiguously threatening manner.

Rose's illustrations helped to define the visual conventions associated with certain genres of classic Hollywood film. Critics have especially noted his influence on noir and horror iconography. His poster for Out of the Past (1947) typified the noir style, portraying Jane Greer's character as a "invitingly hallucinatory babe" and Robert Mitchum's as a "lovesick, surly chump" with a cigarette hanging out of his mouth. Film historian Eddie Muller called it a "classic poster" that captured the character dynamic of attraction matched with distrust, noting that Greer's "dangling gun is a masterstroke: Is she about to toss it away—or open fire?" Muller cited the poster for Born to Kill (1947) as another important visual touchstone. In the Historical Dictionary of Film Noir, Andrew Spicer praised the Born to Kill poster for its depiction of Lawrence Tierney as a "tough guy" with "stony features" and a "ubiquitous hanging cigarette" in his mouth beside Claire Trevor as "the femme fatale ... in the customary long, sheathlike dress". In the horror genre, Rose is credited with the posters for RKO's string of B movies produced by Val Lewton, including Cat People (1942) and The Body Snatcher (1945). Rebello and Allen ranked these posters among the era's finest in the horror genre, equaled only by Karoly Grosz's illustrations for Universal Classic Monsters film posters of the 1930s. Described as "striking" by poster historians Tony Nourmand and Graham Marsh, the poster for Cat People has become one of the "most sought-after [posters] of the horror genre" among collectors, according to auction house Bonhams.

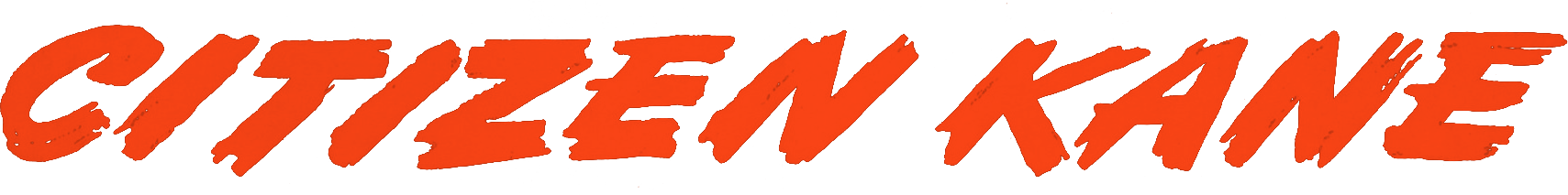

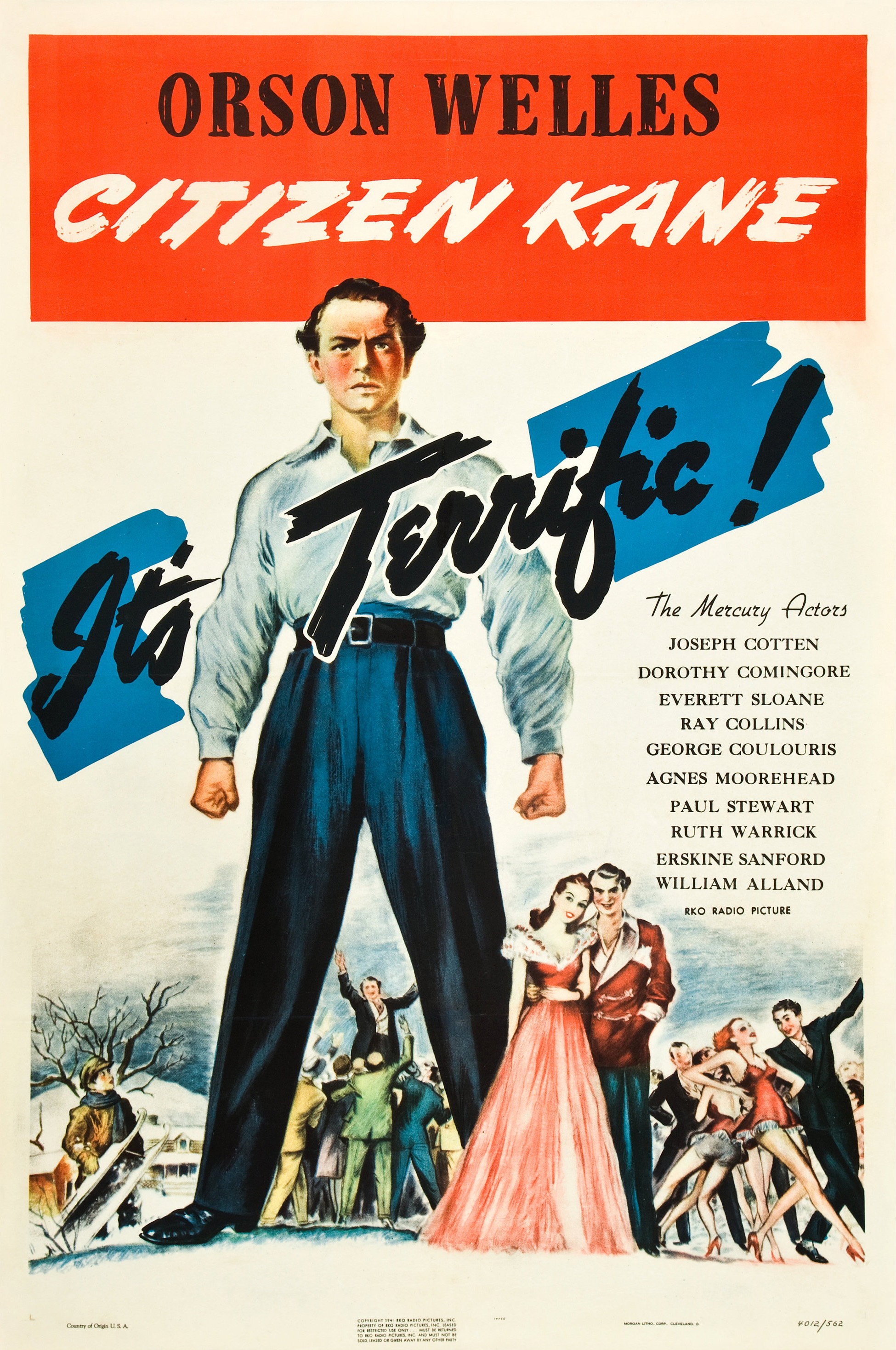
"Style A"
Unknown artist

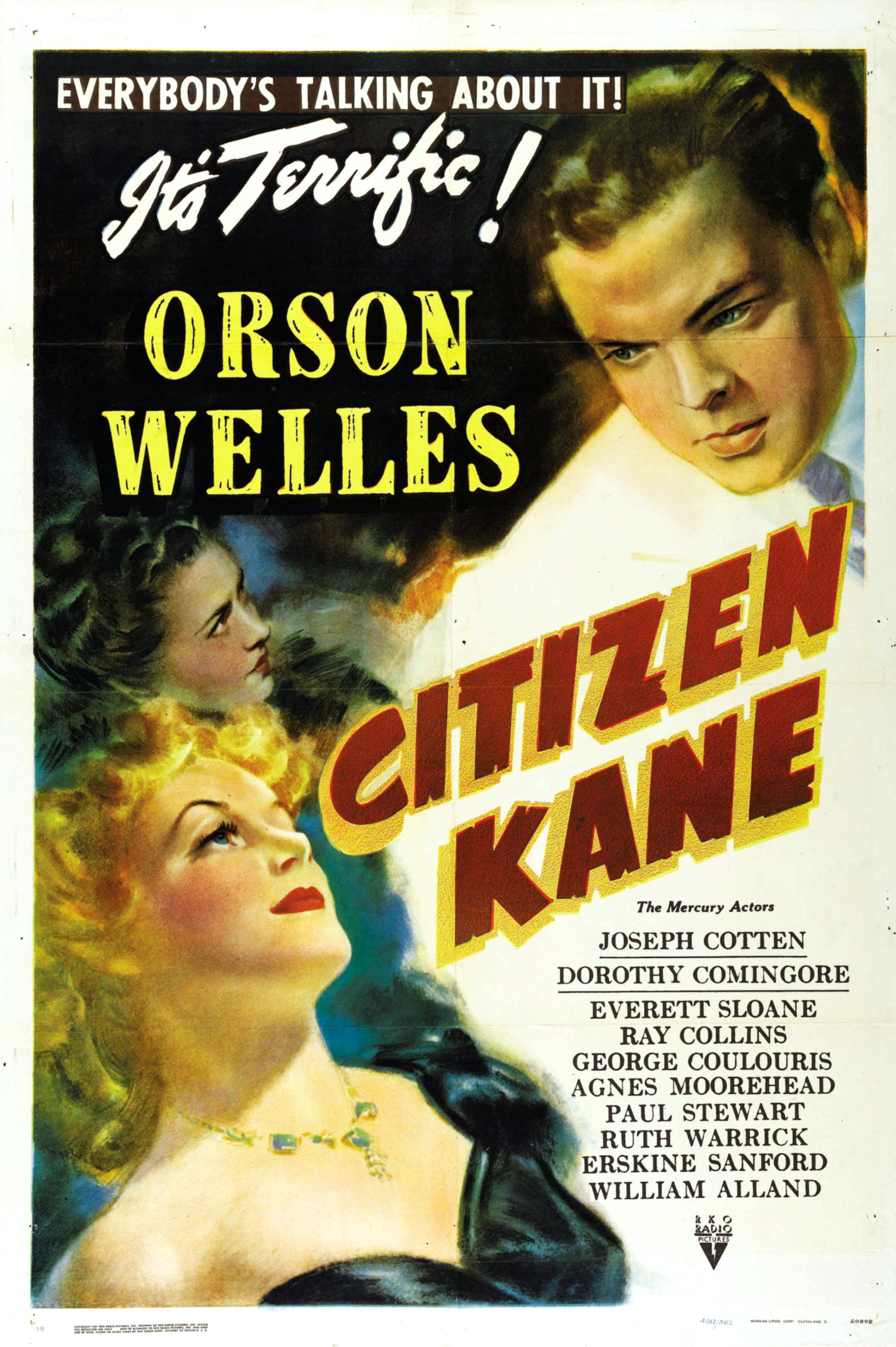
"Style B"
William Rose

Rose's alternate Citizen Kane poster reflected RKO's efforts to market the film as an accessible romance. Although it failed to turn out audiences, the design has been lauded and regarded as superior to the primary poster.

While Rose's artwork was often genre-defining, it could also be genre-defying. Critical appraisals of his posters for Citizen Kane and Cat People have described stylistic clashes between Rose's illustrations and the actual tone, genre, and themes of the advertised films. As advertisements, these posters arguably set misleading expectations for prospective moviegoers, but they have been praised for their bold imagery. Rose's alternate "Style B" poster for Citizen Kane was part of the studio's efforts to market the film as "more conventional and accessible" to a Middle-American audience, who executives feared would be dissuaded by the film's "highbrow" style. Writing for Heritage Auctions, Jim Halperin and Hector Cantu noted that Rose's "Style B" poster "sold the film as a more conventional love story" and, compared with the "Style A" poster by a different artist, Rose's design is now "considered by far the more desirable". English writer Matthew Sweet said that the Cat People illustration acquired its "arresting power" through "its rejection of the picture it advertises". Instead of offering a painting in "moody chiaroscuro", which Sweet asserted would have more accurately conveyed the "poetic horror film['s]" atmosphere of subtle dread, Rose's decidedly unsubtle illustration boasted "a snarling Panther of the Baskervilles and a red-hot dame in a strapless dress".

=== Valuation ===
Some of Rose's paintings and prints have become valuable as collectables. In March 2009, an original linen print of his "style B" Citizen Kane poster sold at auction for $47,800 (equivalent to $72,000 in 2025). In 2015, an original Cat People print sold at auction for $10,625 (equivalent to $14,000 in 2025).

Rose's other illustrations are also collected, though they have not been valued as highly as his posters. Among collectors of vintage paperbacks, Rose has been considered an especially desirable cover illustrator. In November 2011, Rose's watercolor painting for the cover of the 1961 paperback Woman Missing and Other Stories by Helen Nielsen, bundled with a copy of the book itself, sold at auction for $1,015.75 (approx. $1,500 in 2025).

Several original copies of his magazine illustrations for The American Weekly have sold at auction as well. A signed illustration titled "Strike Up the Band" (1951)—a tempera painting depicting Judy Garland and Mickey Rooney in the 1940 film of the same name—was valued at $500 c. 1991 (around $1,182 in 2025). His illustration "Anna Gould's Bitter Romance" (1950) sold for $632 in 2003 ($1,106 in 2025), while "Sheba's Secret" (undated) sold for only $87 in 2012.

== Personal life and death ==
Rose was married to Miriam Roberts Rose (née Rubin; 1912 or 1913 – March 8, 1964), a concert pianist from New York. Their wedding took place on October 9, 1935, in Pittsburgh. She gave recitals in both Pennsylvania and New York and worked for many years as a private piano teacher. They had two daughters, Penny and Tina. Miriam Rose died at age 51 at Manhattan's Lenox Hill Hospital on March 8, 1964.

William Rose died at age 62 in New York City on May 29, 1972.

== Attributed illustrations ==
=== List of film posters attributed to Rose ===
Rose reportedly illustrated "dozens" of posters for RKO Radio Pictures alone, in addition to work for other studios. However, only a fraction of his posters have been attributed to him. While he is known to have contributed poster art to Paramount Pictures, none of his illustrations for the studio have been attributed.

Film posters by William Rose
Date		Film title	Studio	Ref.
Year	Premiere or release	Film title	Studio	Ref.
1935	Dec 18, 1935	Whipsaw	Metro-Goldwyn-Mayer (MGM)	
1936	Sep 4, 1936	Swing Time	RKO Radio Pictures	
1938	May 13, 1938	Vivacious Lady	RKO Radio Pictures	
1941	May 1, 1941	Citizen Kane	RKO Radio Pictures	
1941	Aug 20, 1941	The Little Foxes	RKO Radio Pictures	
1941	Nov 14, 1941	Suspicion	RKO Radio Pictures	
1941	Dec 31, 1941	Babes on Broadway	Metro-Goldwyn-Mayer (MGM)	
1942	Dec 25, 1942	Cat People	RKO Radio Pictures	
1943	Feb 12, 1943	Journey into Fear	RKO Radio Pictures	
1943	Apr 21, 1943	I Walked with a Zombie	RKO Radio Pictures	
1943	May 8, 1943	The Leopard Man	RKO Radio Pictures	
1943	Aug 21, 1943	The Seventh Victim	RKO Radio Pictures	
1943	Dec 24, 1943	The Ghost Ship (Note: Heritage Auctions has twice noted that poster art for The Ghost Ship was "most likely executed by artist William Rose." Reel Art attributes Rose as the illustrator of all of the posters for RKO films produced by Val Lewton, which would include The Ghost Ship.)	RKO Radio Pictures	
1944	Mar 2, 1944	The Curse of the Cat People	RKO Radio Pictures	
1944	Jul 28, 1944	Mademoiselle Fifi	RKO Radio Pictures	
1944	Sep 1, 1944	Youth Runs Wild	RKO Radio Pictures	
1945	May 25, 1945	The Body Snatcher	RKO Radio Pictures	
1945	Sep 7, 1945	Isle of the Dead	RKO Radio Pictures	
1946	May 10, 1946	Bedlam	RKO Radio Pictures	
1946	Oct 29, 1946	Nocturne	RKO Radio Pictures	
1947	May 3, 1947	Born to Kill	RKO Radio Pictures	
1947	Nov 25, 1947	Out of the Past	RKO Radio Pictures	
1947	Dec 9, 1947	The Bishop's Wife	RKO Radio Pictures	

==== Poster gallery ====
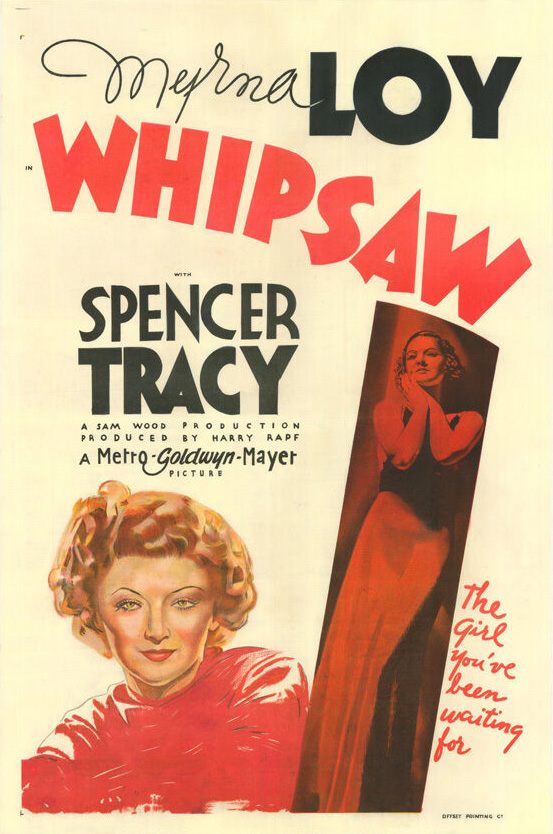
Whipsaw (1935)

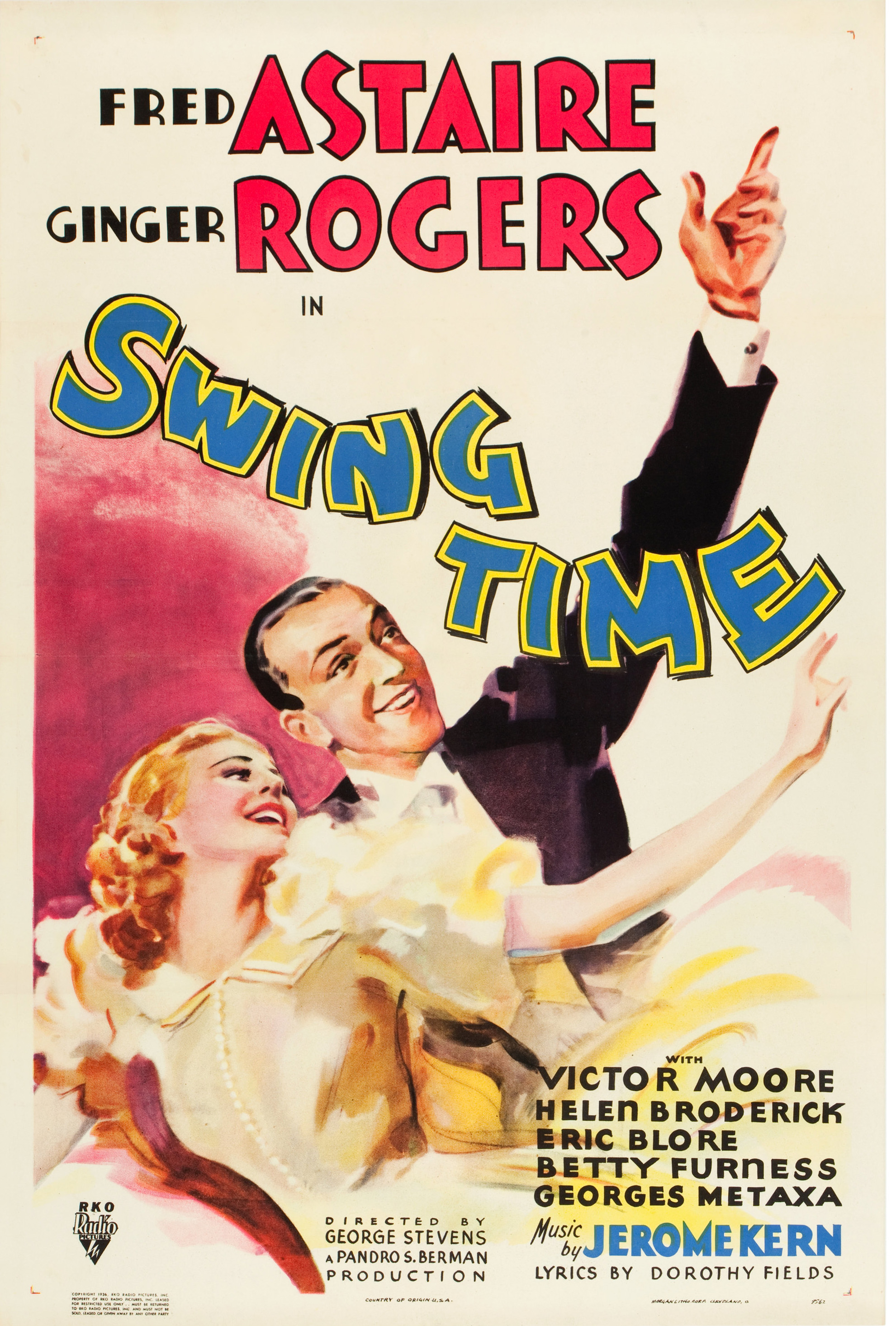
Swing Time (1936)

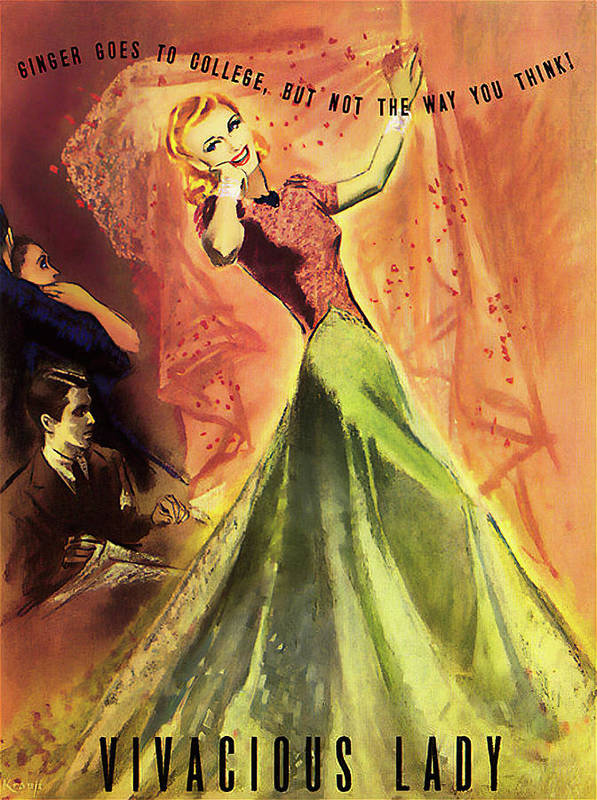
Vivacious Lady (1938)

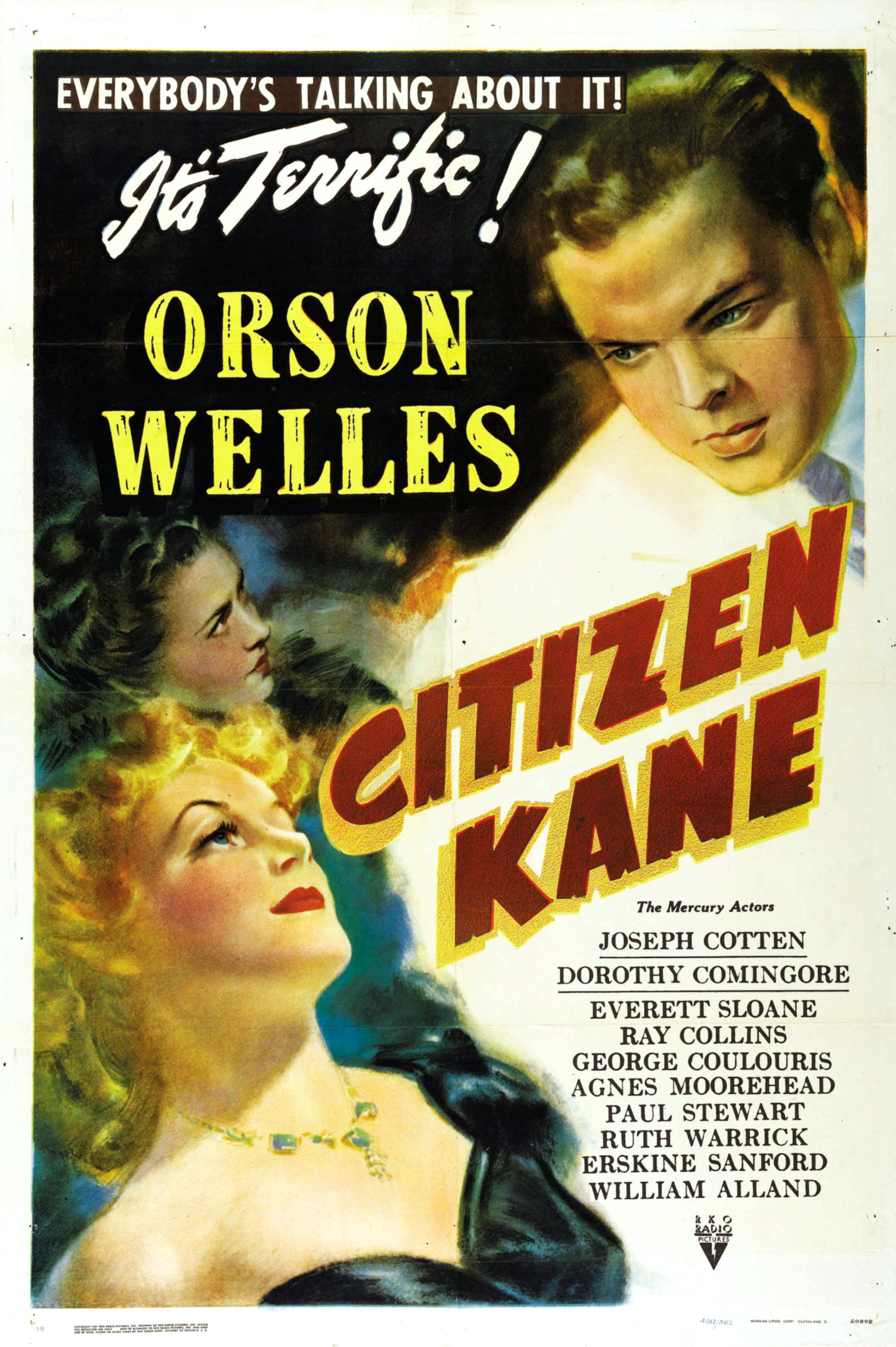
Citizen Kane (1941) – "Style B"

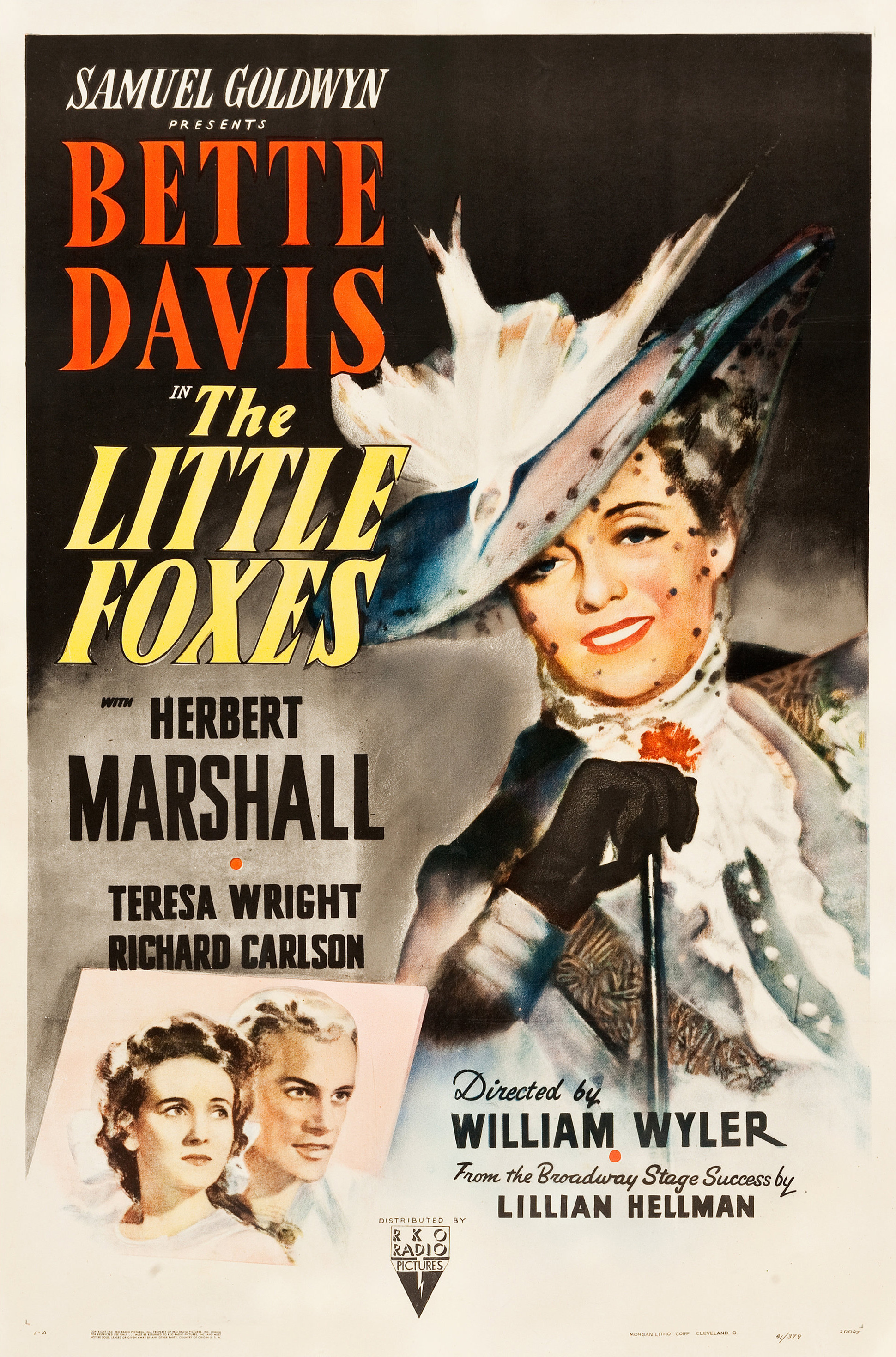
The Little Foxes (1941)

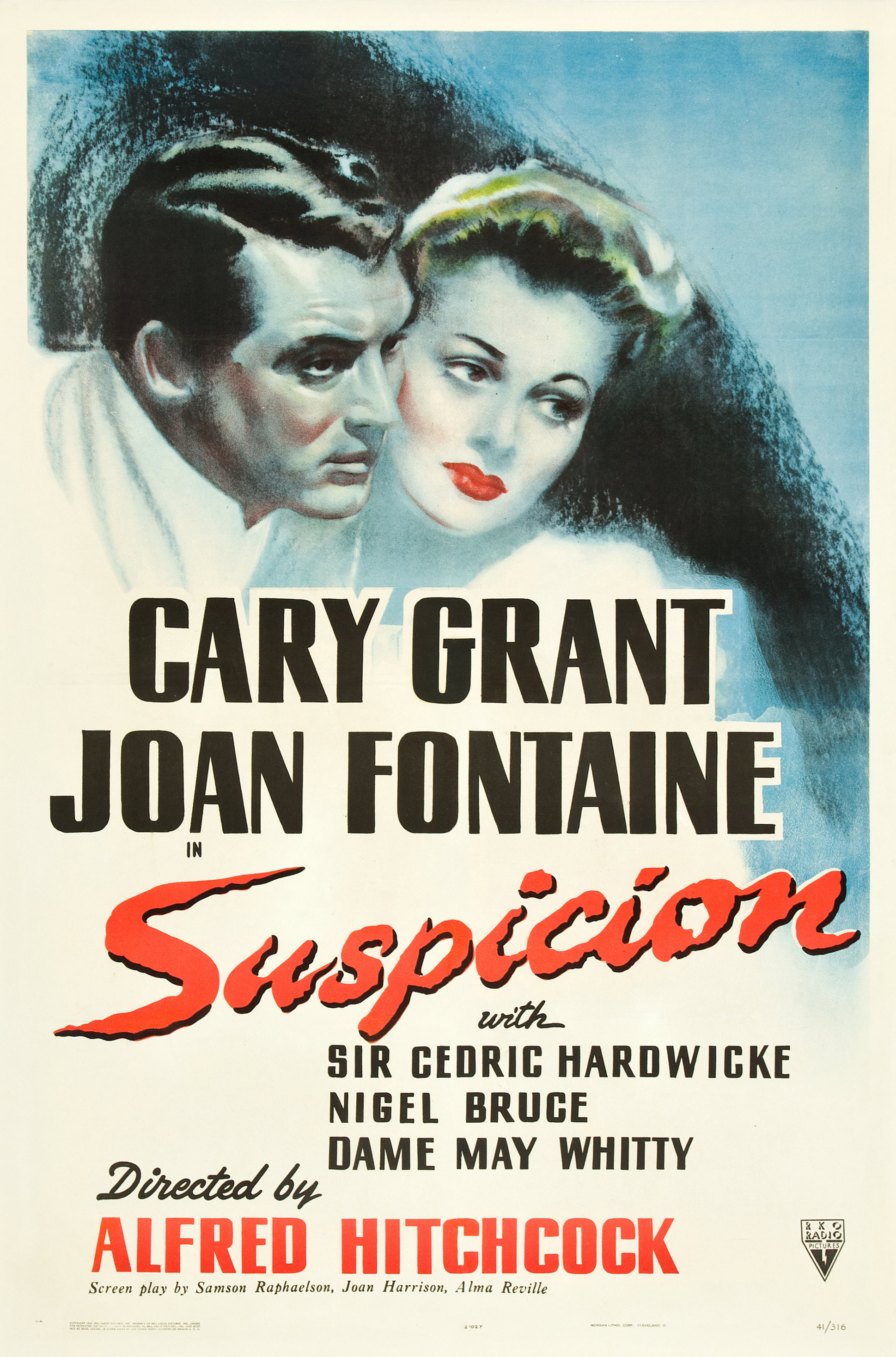
Suspicion (1941)

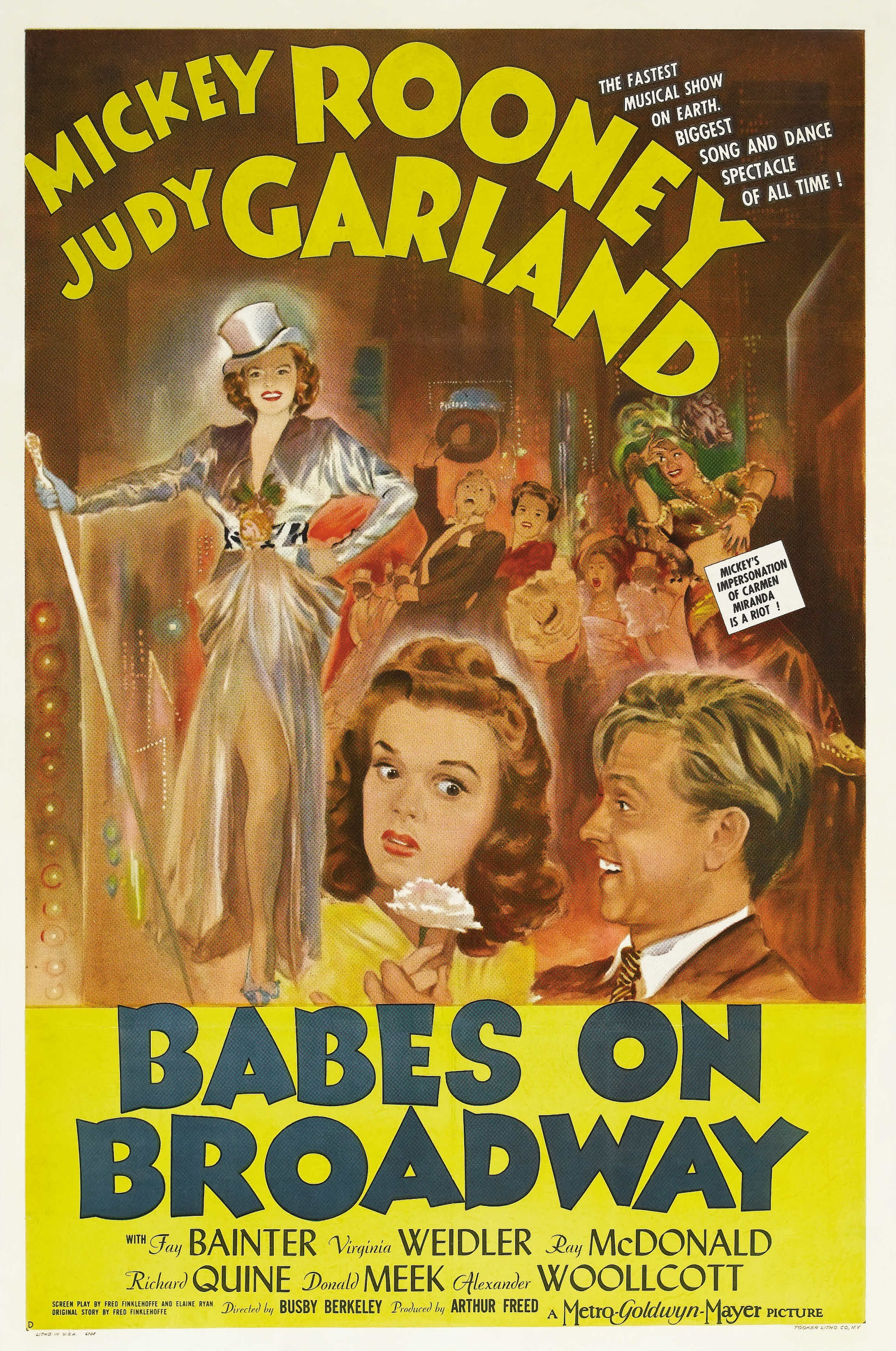
Babes on Broadway (1941)

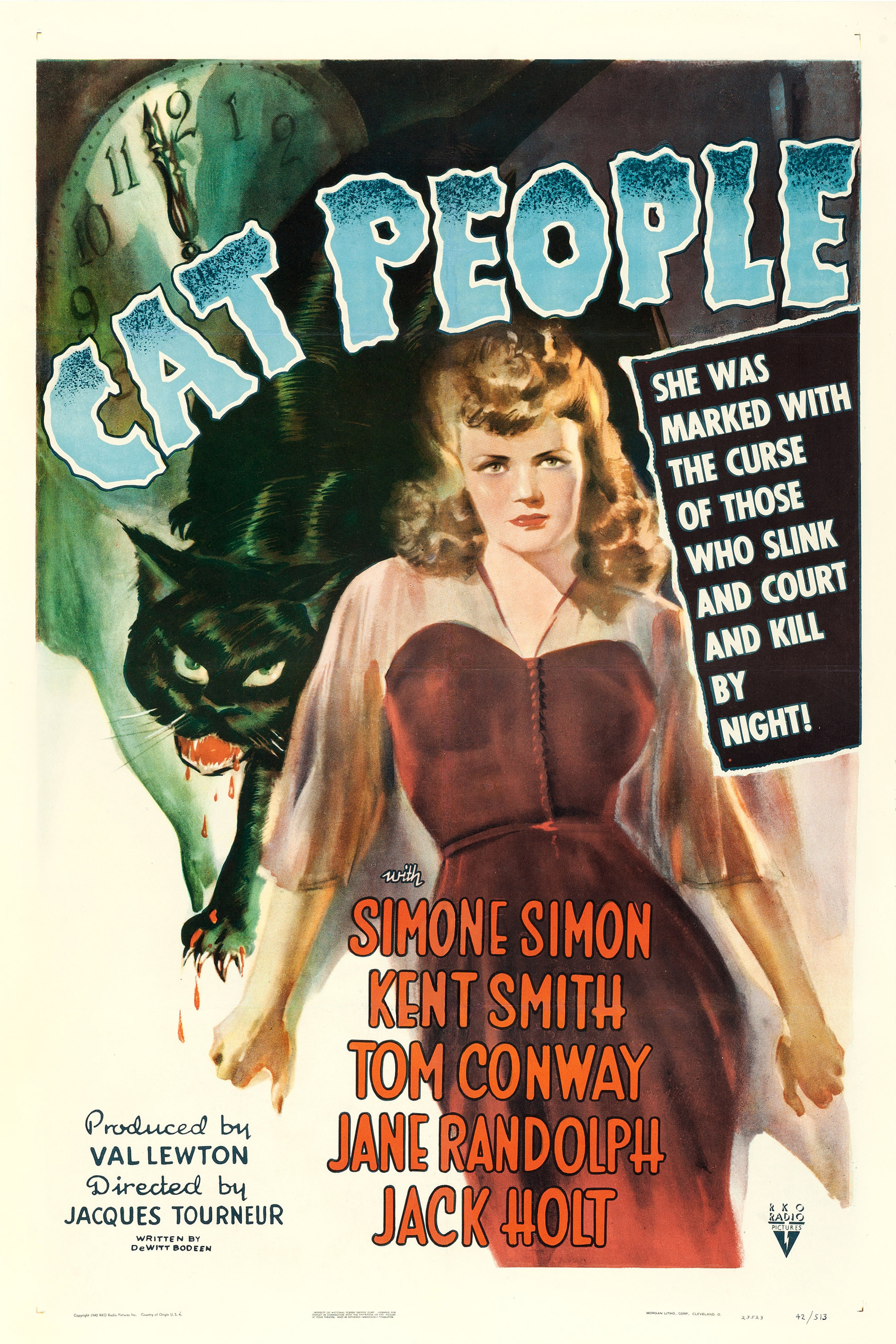
Cat People (1942)

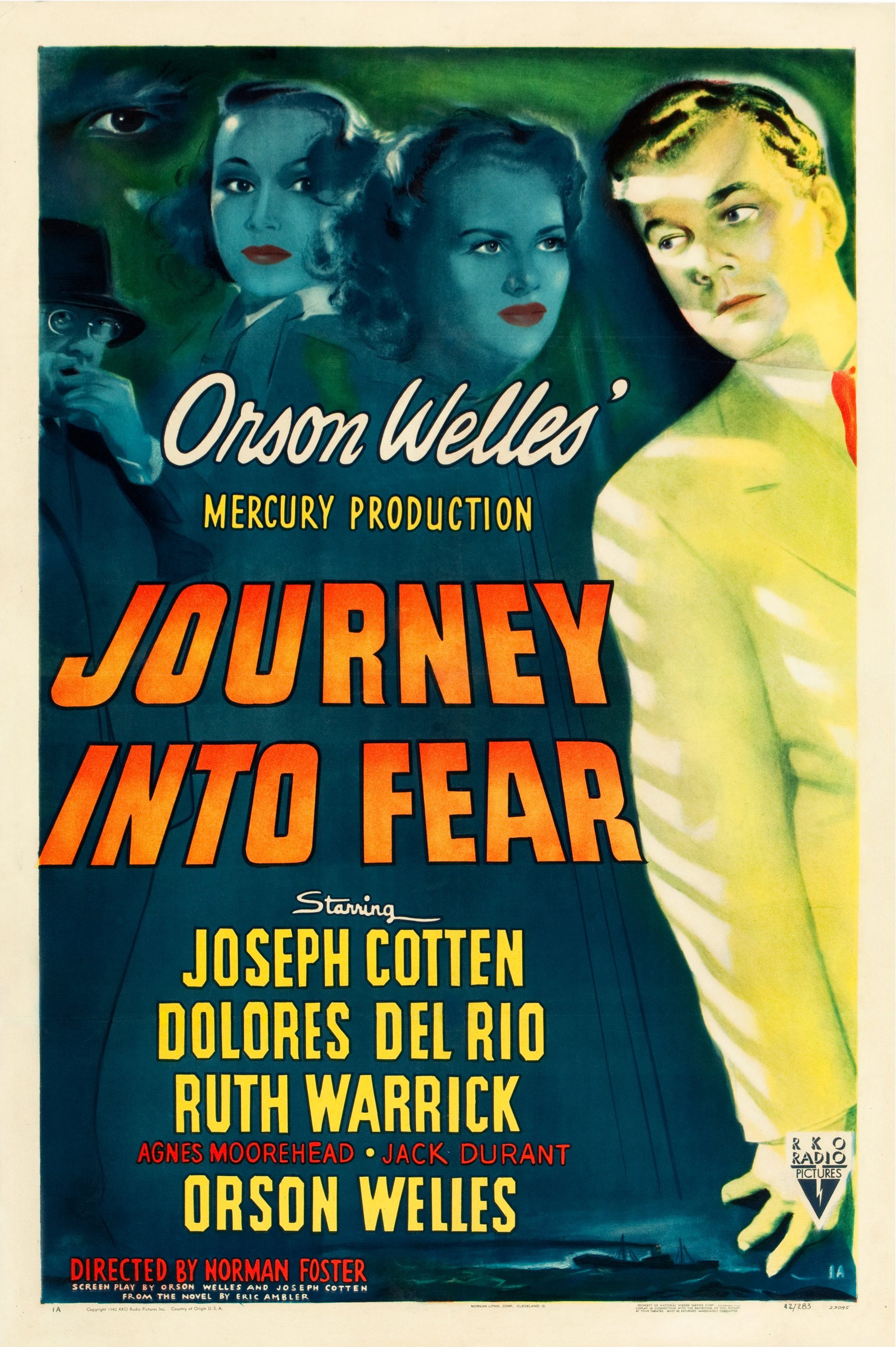
Journey into Fear (1943)

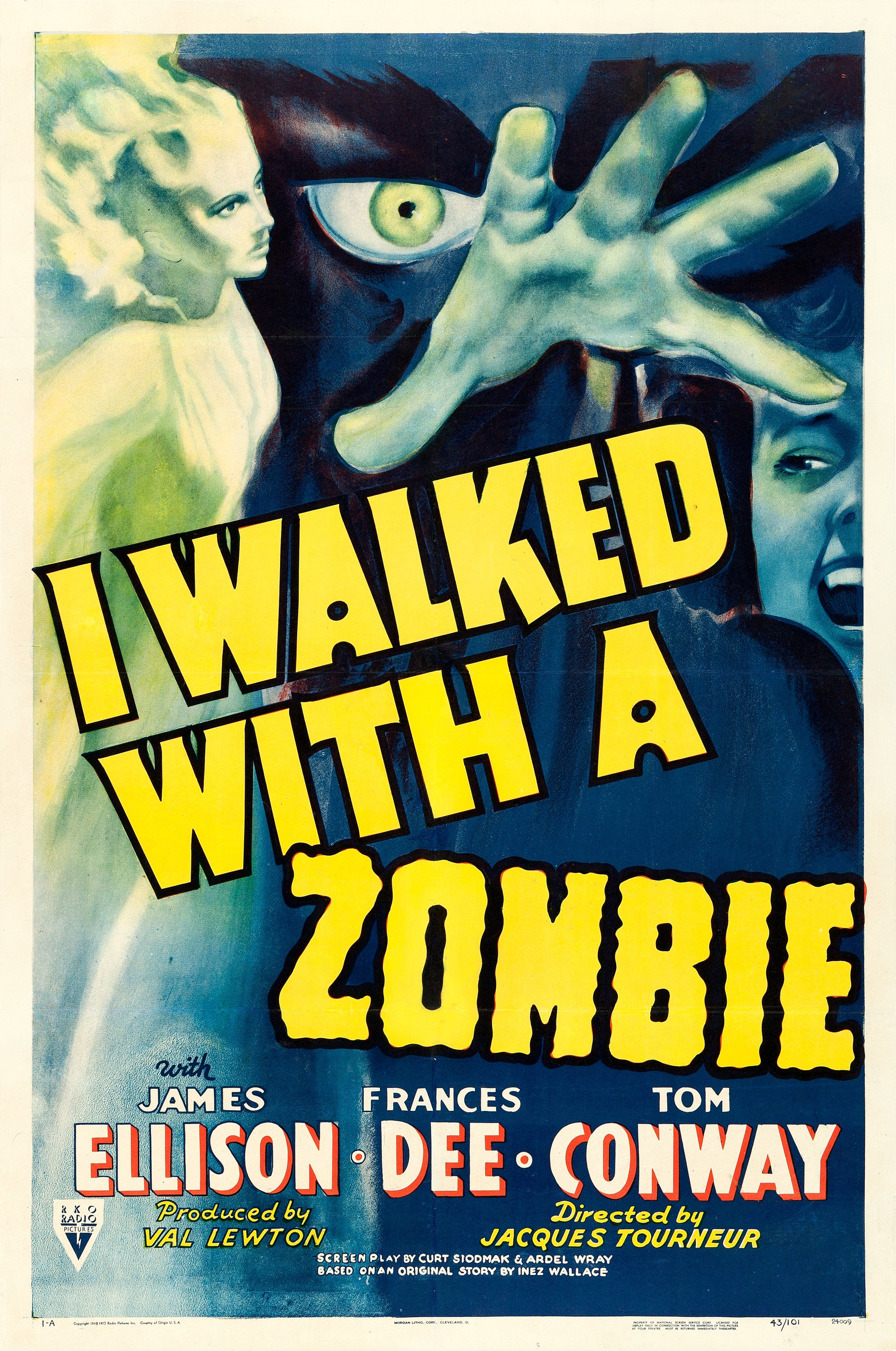
I Walked with a Zombie (1943)

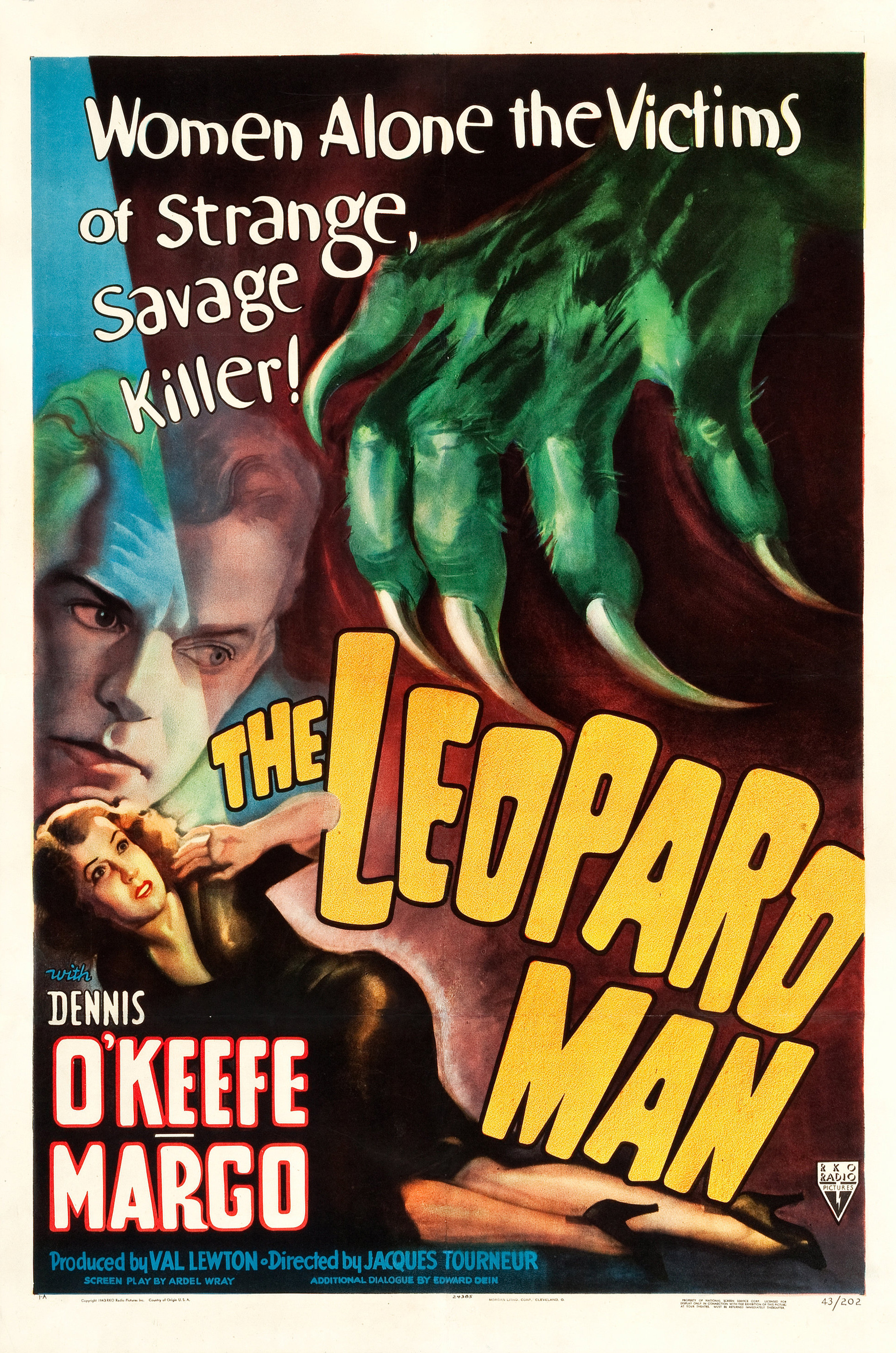
The Leopard Man (1943)

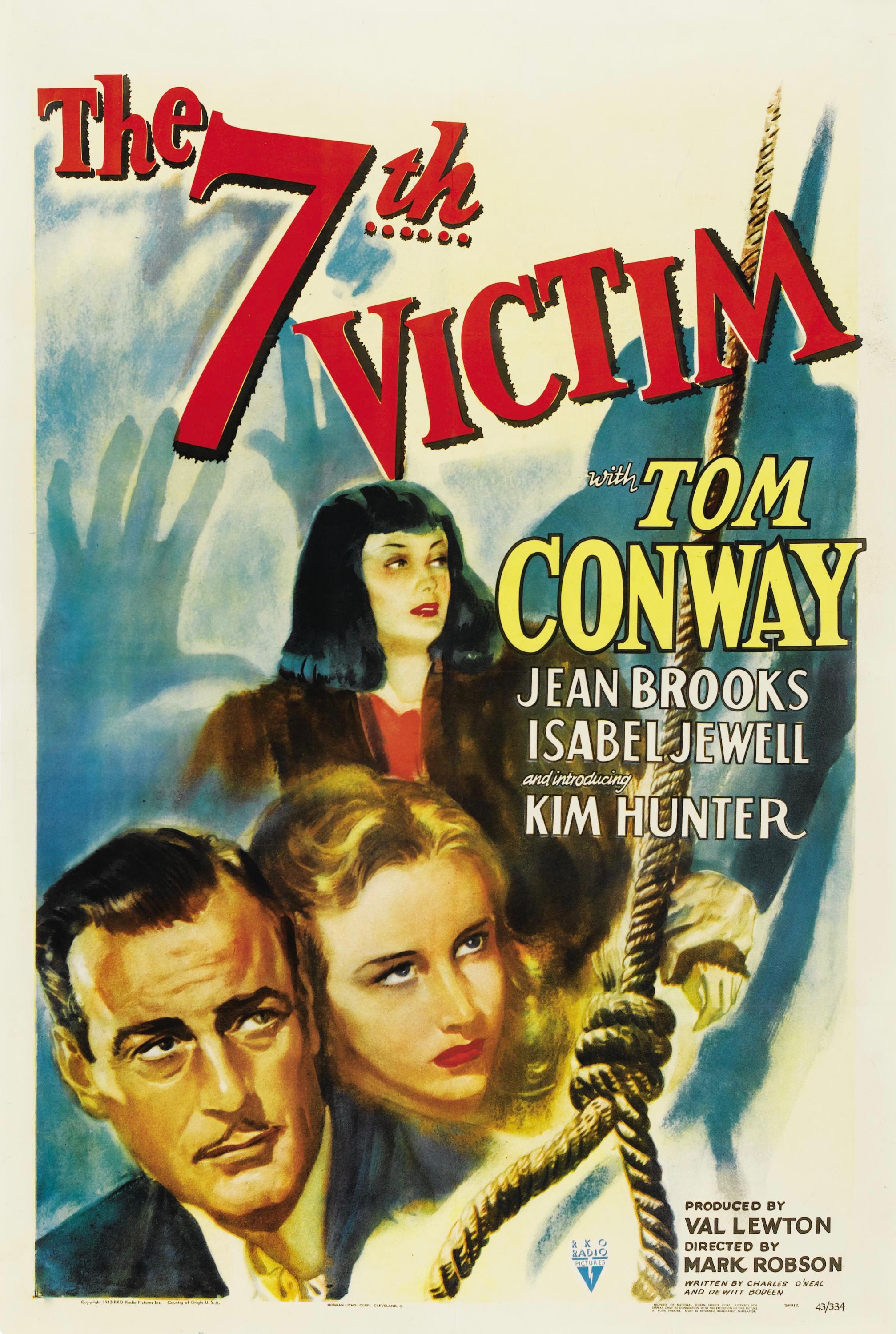
The Seventh Victim (1943)

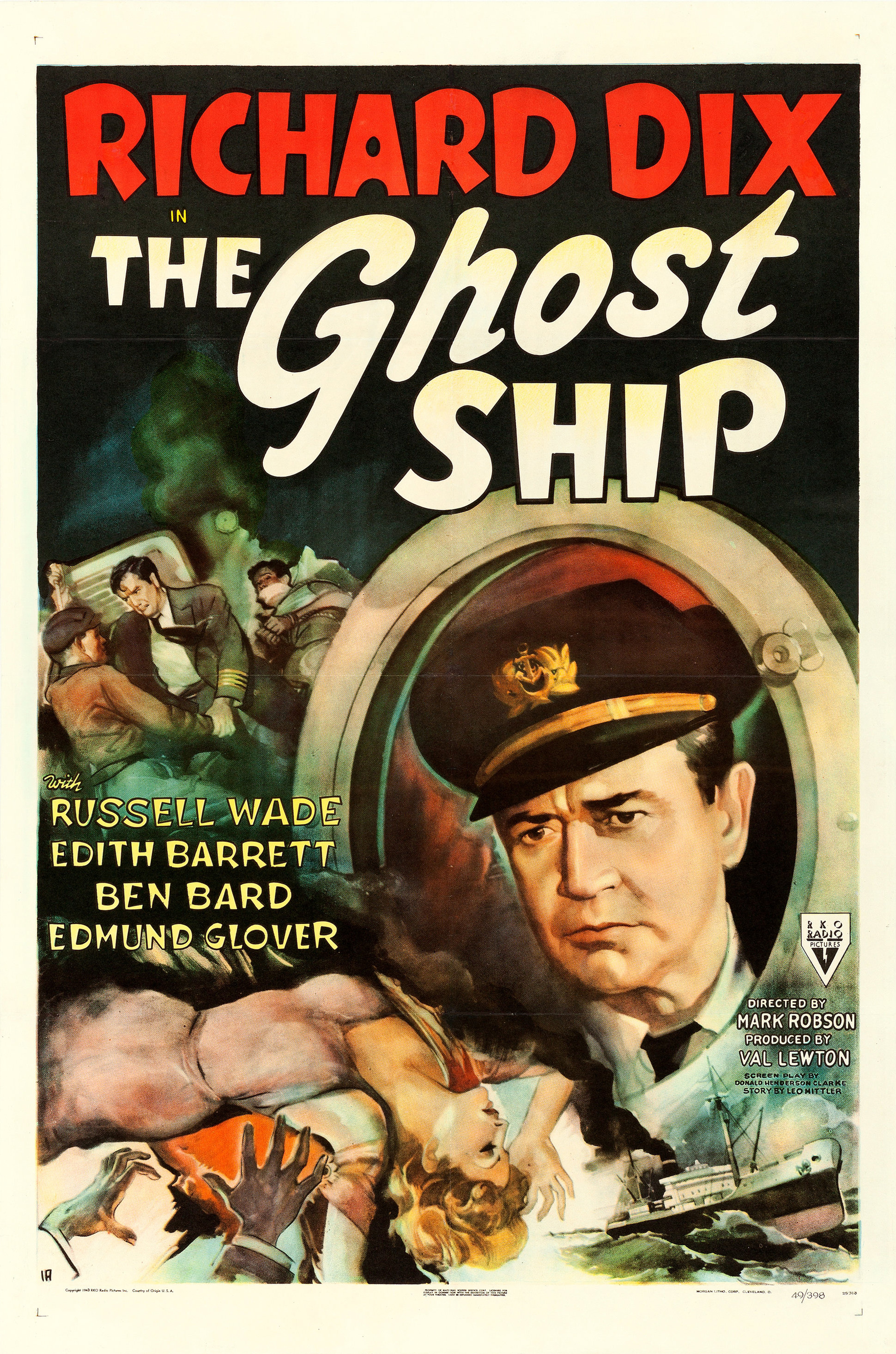
The Ghost Ship (1943)

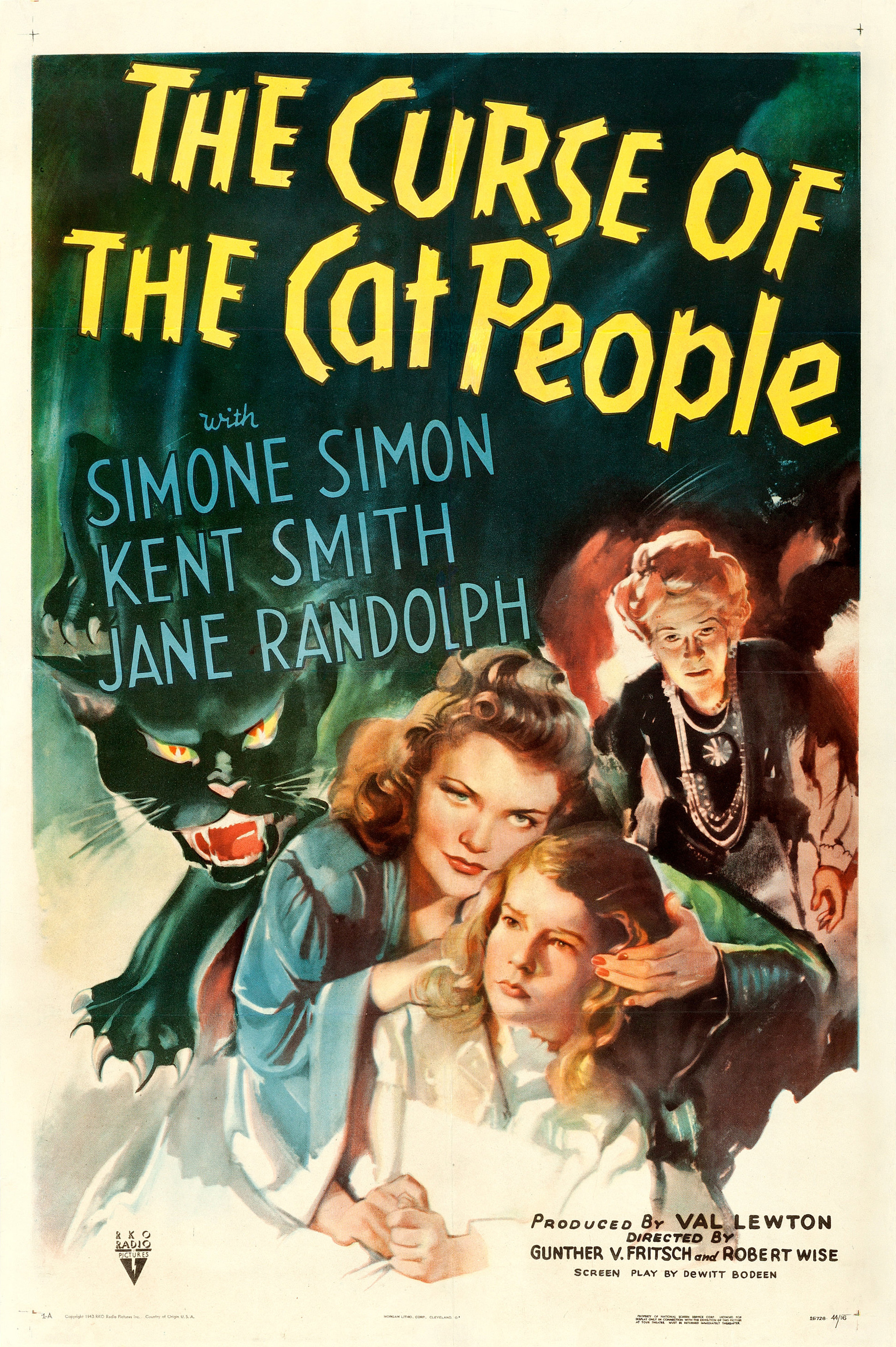
The Curse of the Cat People (1944)

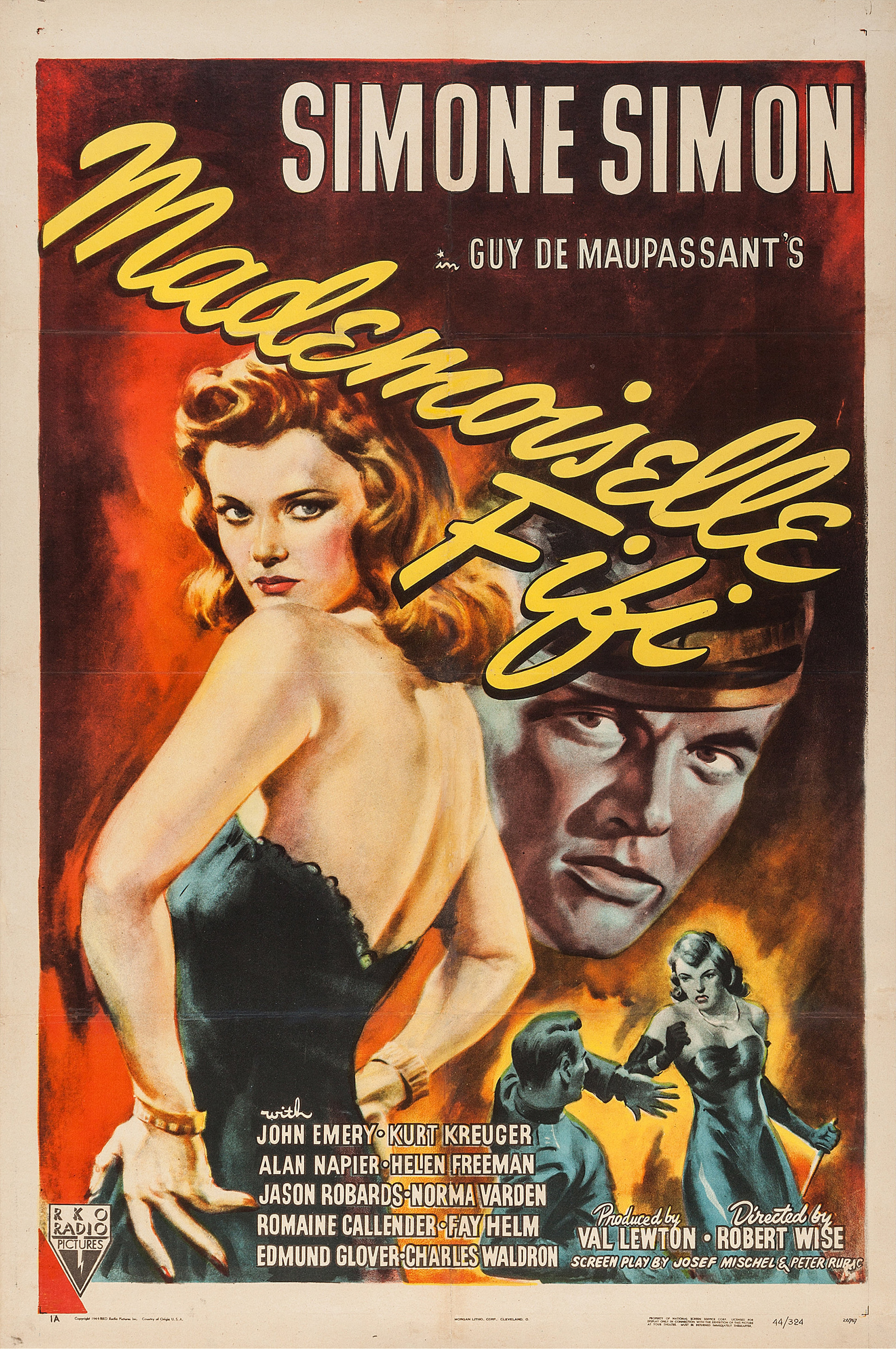
Mademoiselle Fifi (1944)

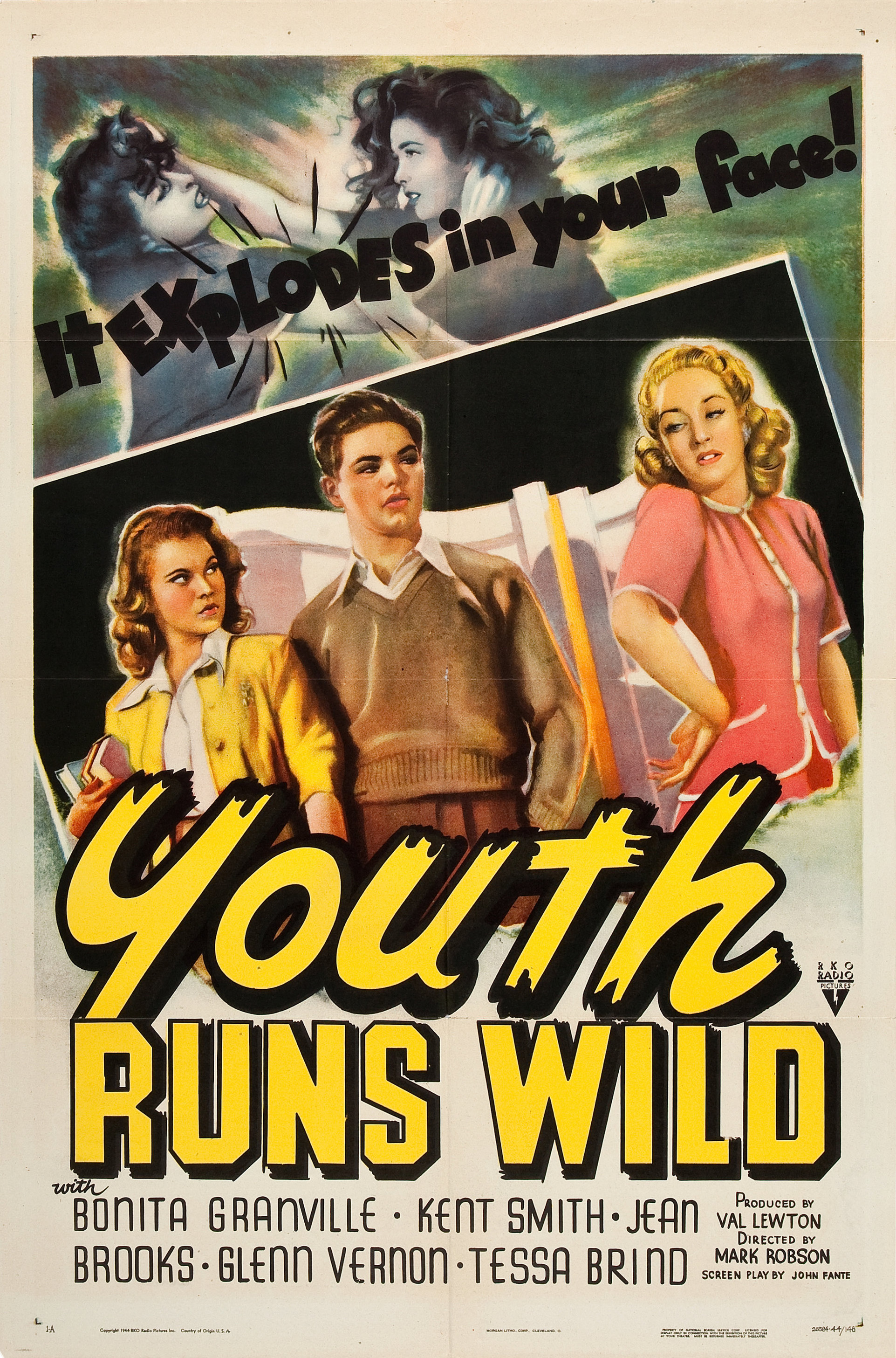
Youth Runs Wild (1944)

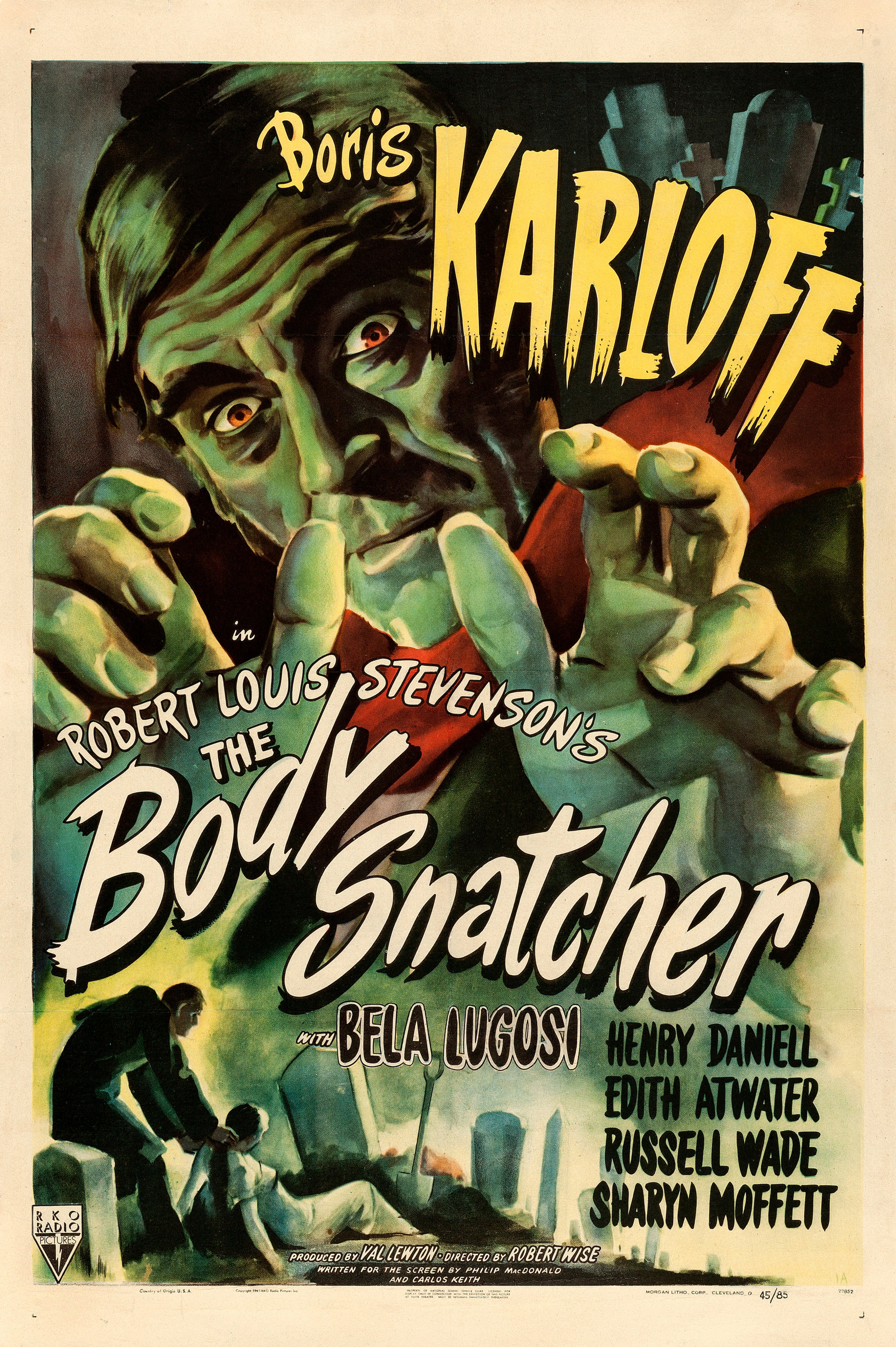
The Body Snatcher (1945)

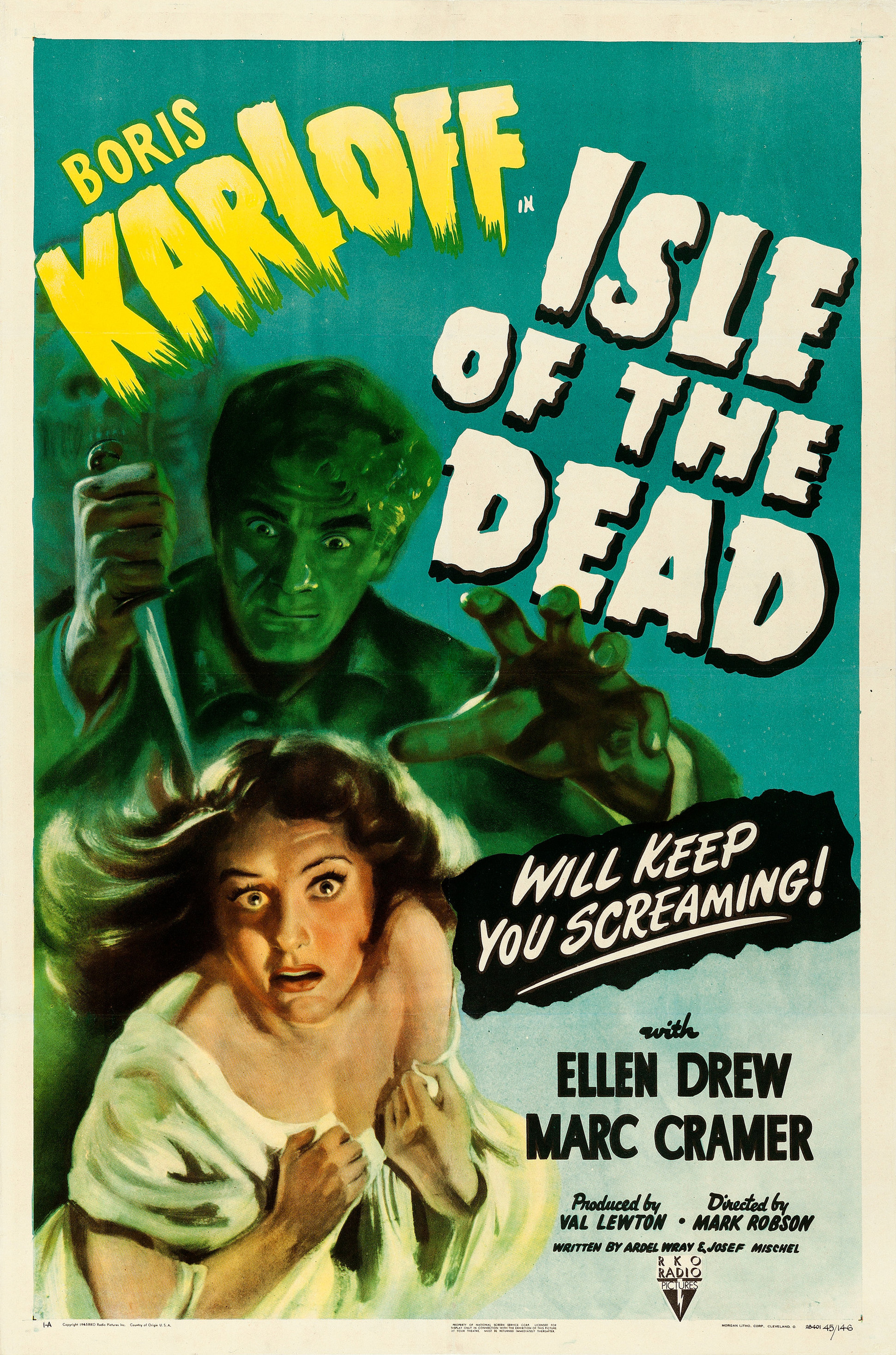
Isle of the Dead (1945)

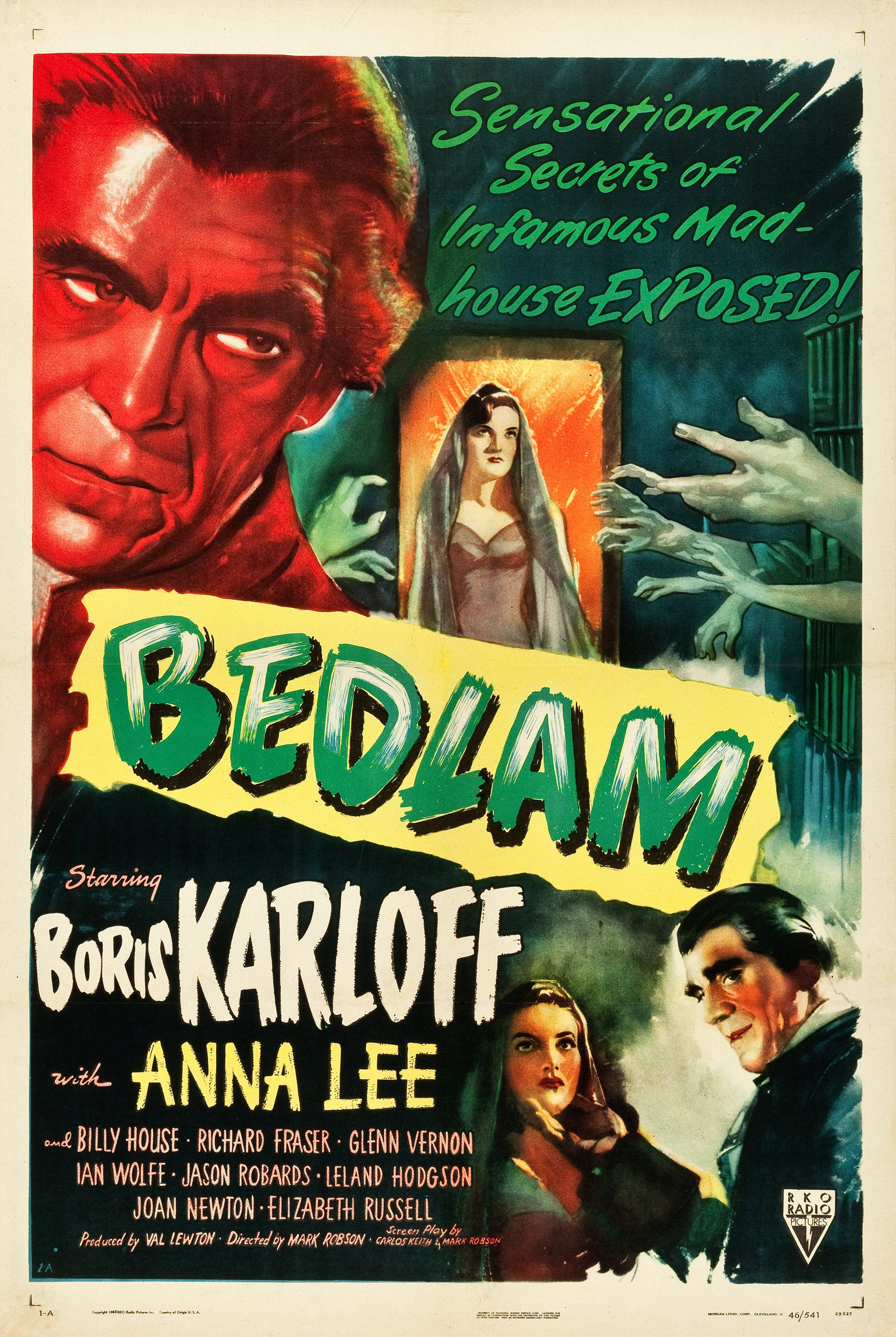
Bedlam (1946)

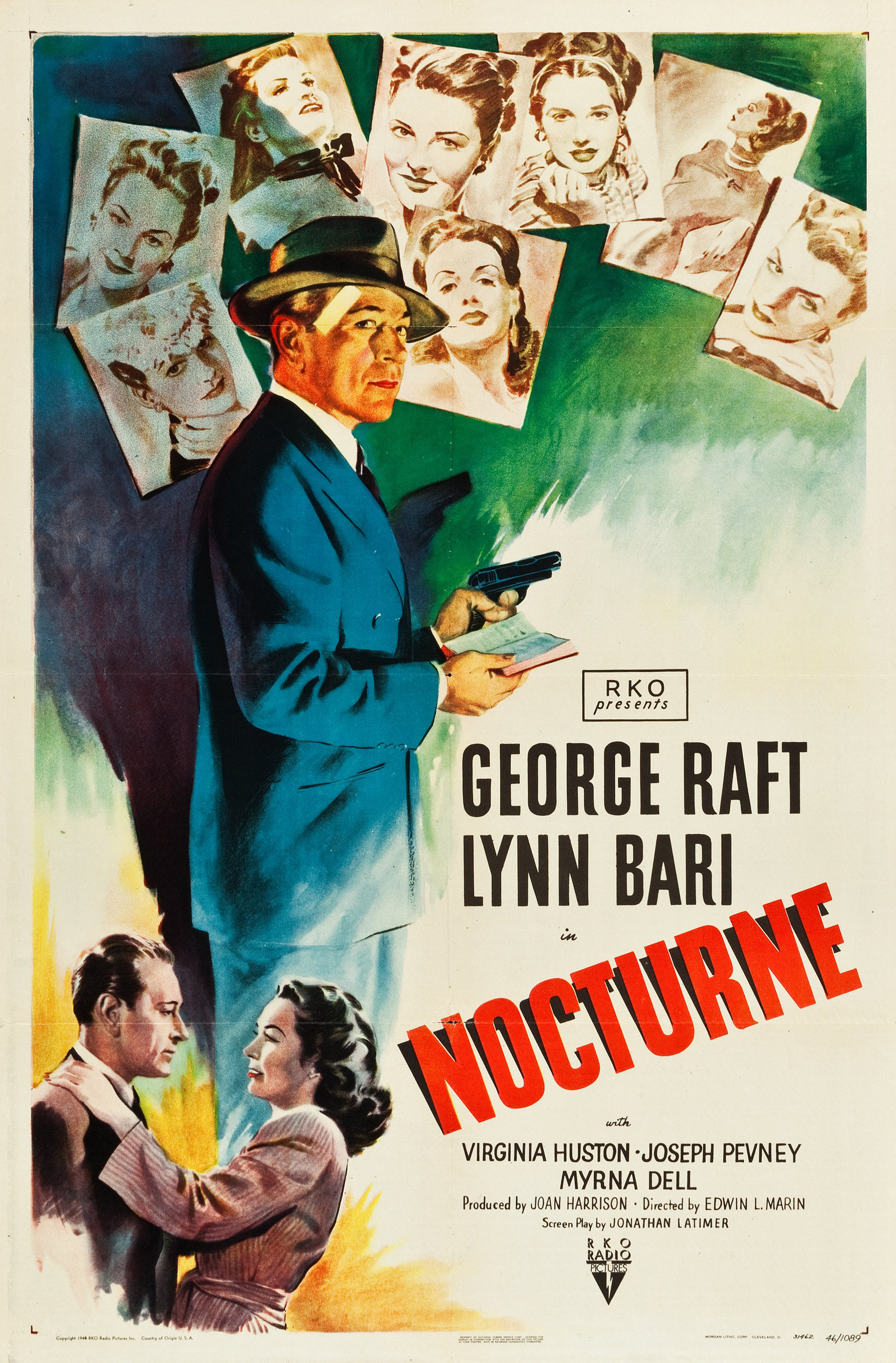
Nocturne (1946)

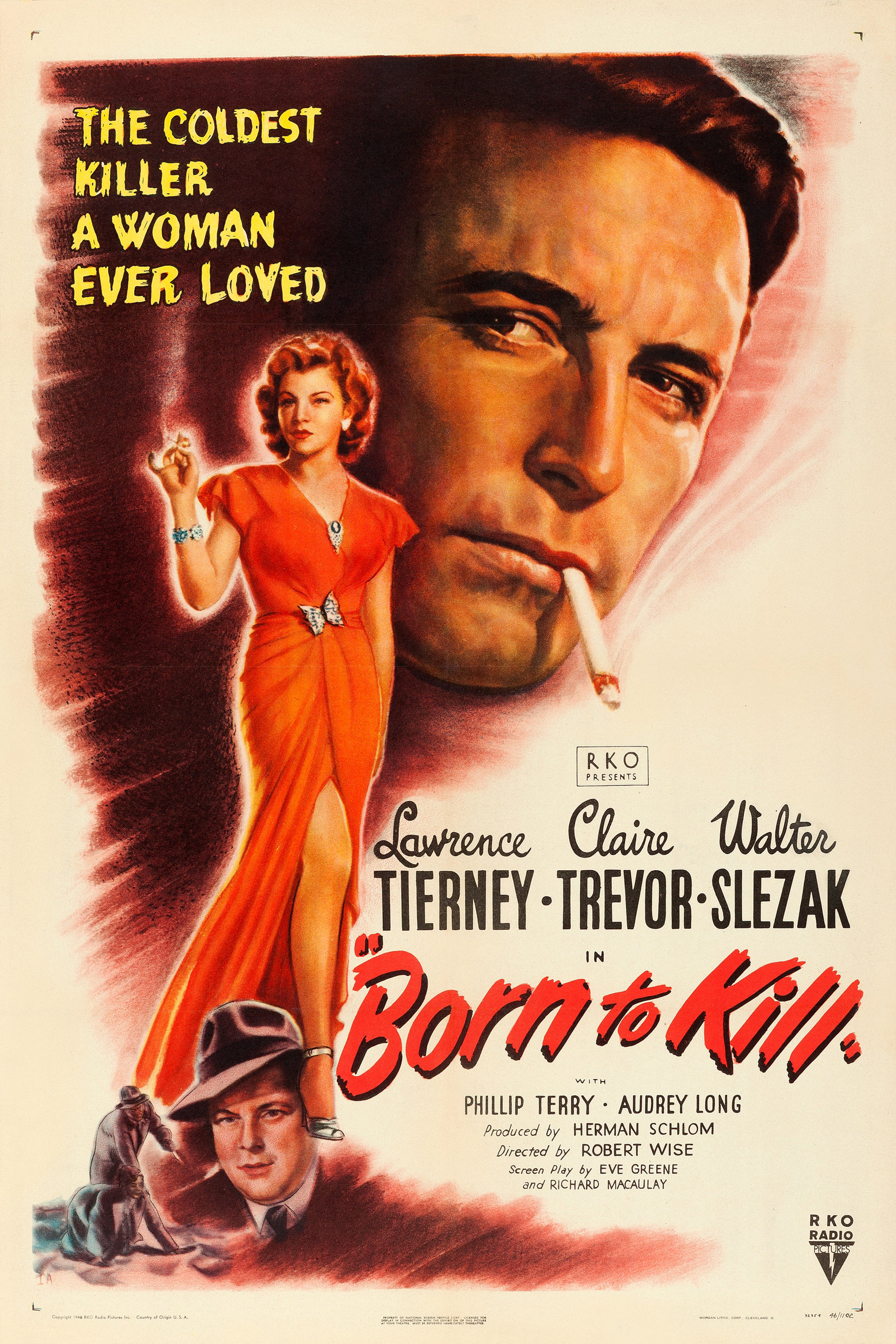
Born to Kill (1947)

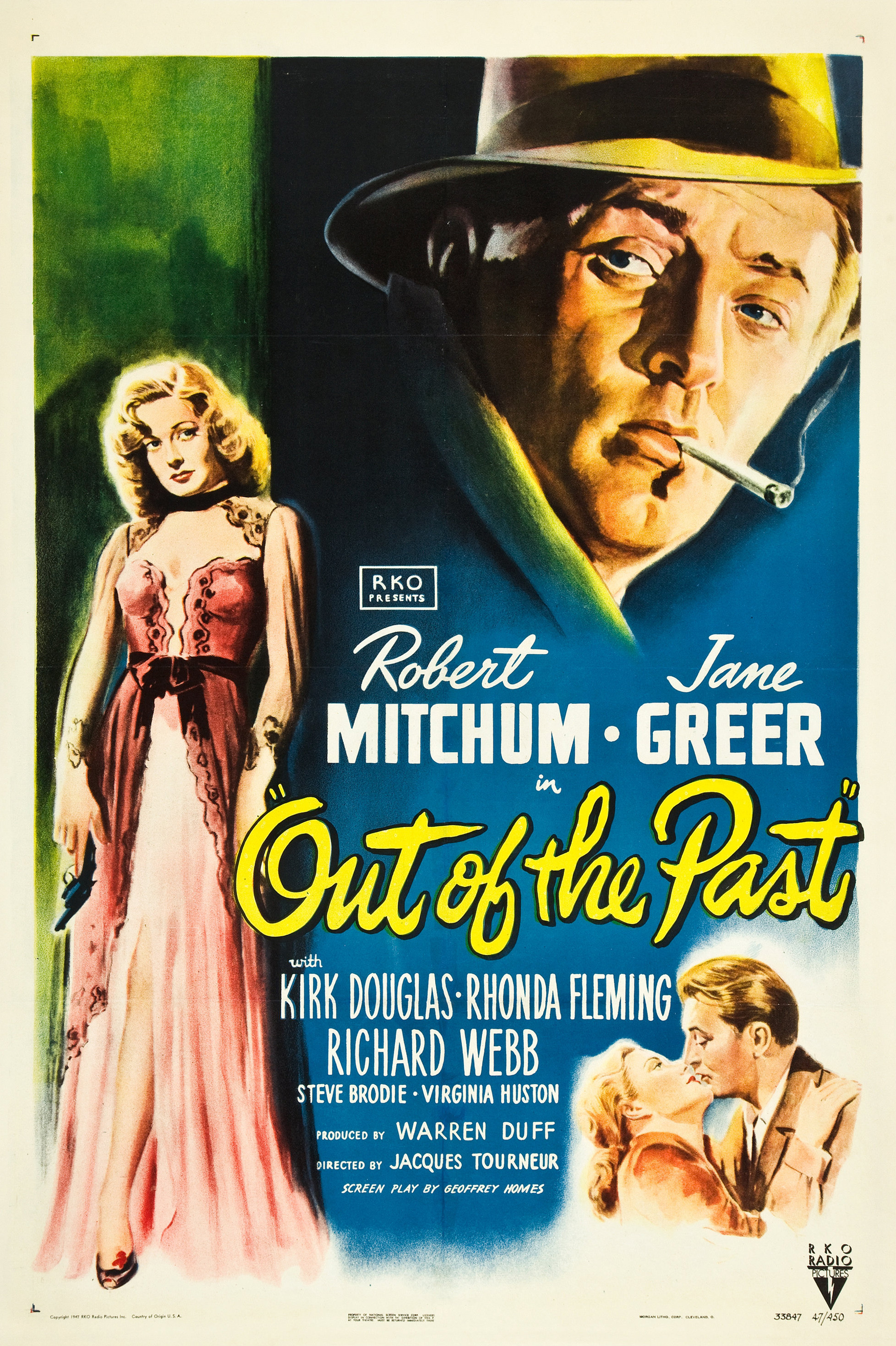
Out of the Past (1947)

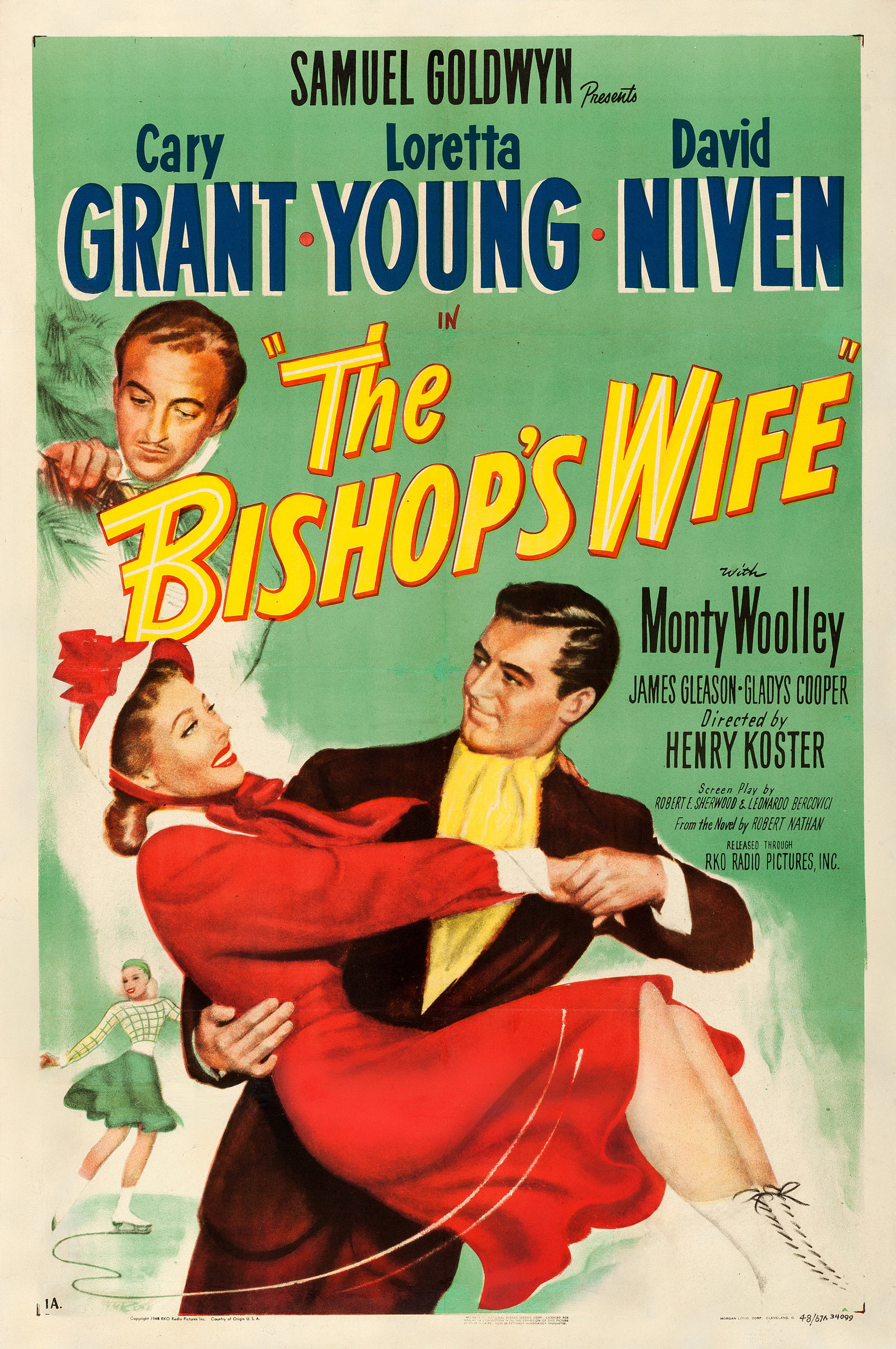
The Bishop's Wife (1948)

=== List of book covers attributed to Rose ===
The list below includes book cover illustrations that have been credited to Rose in either an online scan of the original book or a secondary source. It is not necessarily exhaustive.

Book covers by William Rose
Year	Book title	Author	Publisher	Edition information			Ref.
Year	Book title	Author	Publisher	Ed.	1st pub.	No.	Ref.
1954	The Girl with the Scarlet Brand	Charles Boswell and Lewis Thompson	Gold Medal Books	1st	—N/a	GMB #384	
1955	My Name Is Michael Sibley	John Bingham	Dell Books	Reprint	1952	Dell #813	
1955	There Is a Tide	Agatha Christie	Dell Books	Reprint	1948	Dell #830	
1955	The Frightened Fiancée	George Harmon Coxe	Dell Books	Reprint	1953	Dell #838	
1955	The Bridal Bed Murders	A. E. Martin	Dell Books	Reprint	1954	Dell #840	
1955	The Evil of Time	Evelyn Berckman	Dell Books	Reprint	1954	Dell #841	
1955	The Shocking Secret	Holly Roth	Dell Books	1st	—N/a	Dell #850	
1955	The Frightened Wife	Mary Roberts Rinehart	Dell Books	Reprint	1953	Dell D154	
1956	Joy Street	Clifton Cuthbert	Lion Books	Reprint	1933	LL75	
1956	Julie	George Milburn	Lion Books	1st	—N/a	LL82	
1956	Woman Without Love	André Maurois (trans. Joan Charles)	Pyramid Books	Reprint	1945	R232	
1956	To Walk the Night	William Sloane	Dell Books	Reprint	1937	Dell #856	
1956	The Murder That Wouldn't Stay Solved	Hampton Stone	Dell Books	Reprint	1951	Dell #883	
1956	The Butcher's Wife	Owen Cameron	Dell Books	Reprint	1954	Dell #896	
1956	Washington Whispers Murder	Leslie Ford	Dell Books	Reprint	1953	Dell #908	
1957	So Young, So Wicked	Jonathan Craig	Gold Medal Books	1st	—N/a	GMB #669	
1957	Dead Stop (Dark Road)	Doris Miles Disney	Dell Books	Reprint	1946	Dell #929	
1957	Diamonds Are Forever	Ian Fleming	Permabooks	1st US	1956	M-3084	
1957	Hellflower	George O. Smith	Pyramid Books	Reprint	1953	G298	
1957	The Kill-Off	Jim Thompson	Lion Books	1st	—N/a	LL142	
1958	Strange Fulfillment	Denys Val Baker	Pyramid Books	1st	—N/a	G341	
1958	Good Luck to the Corpse	Max Murray	Pyramid Books	Reprint	1951	G362	
1958	The Case of the Runaway Corpse	Erle Stanley Gardner	Pocket Books (Cardinal Edition)	Reprint	1954	C-281	
1958	The Four of Hearts	Ellery Queen	Avon	Reprint	1938	T-242	
1960	Playback	Raymond Chandler	Pocket Books (Cardinal Edition)	4th (1st pbk)	1958	C-375	
1960	The Man Who Disappeared	George Harmon Coxe	Dell Books	Reprint	1953	Dell #1013	
1961	Woman Missing and Other Stories	Helen Nielsen	Ace Books (mystery double series)	1st	—N/a	F-121	
1961	The Berlin Couriers	James McGovern	Pyramid Books	Reprint	1960	G651	

==== Paperback cover gallery ====
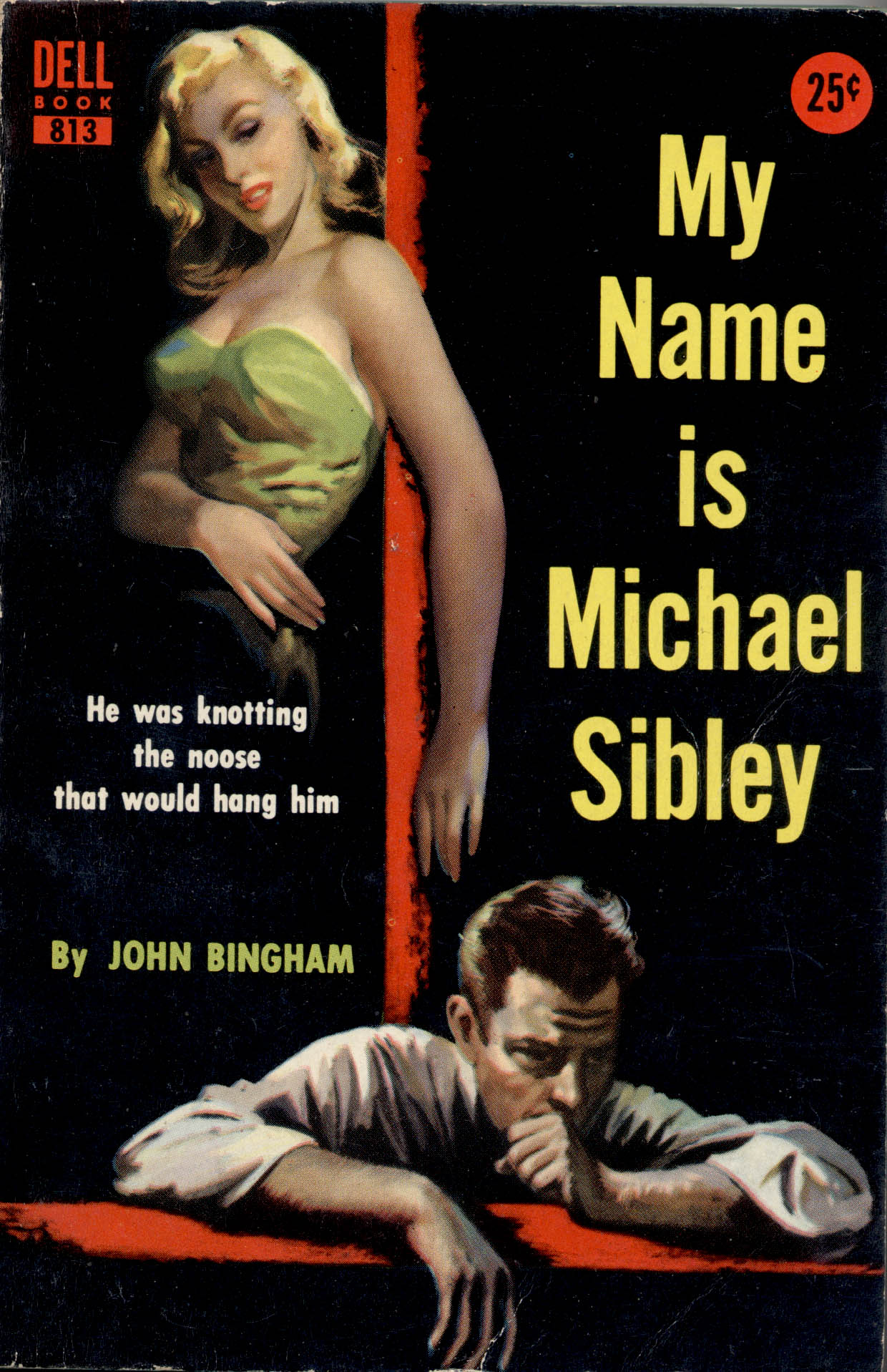
My Name Is Michael Sibley (1955), John Bingham

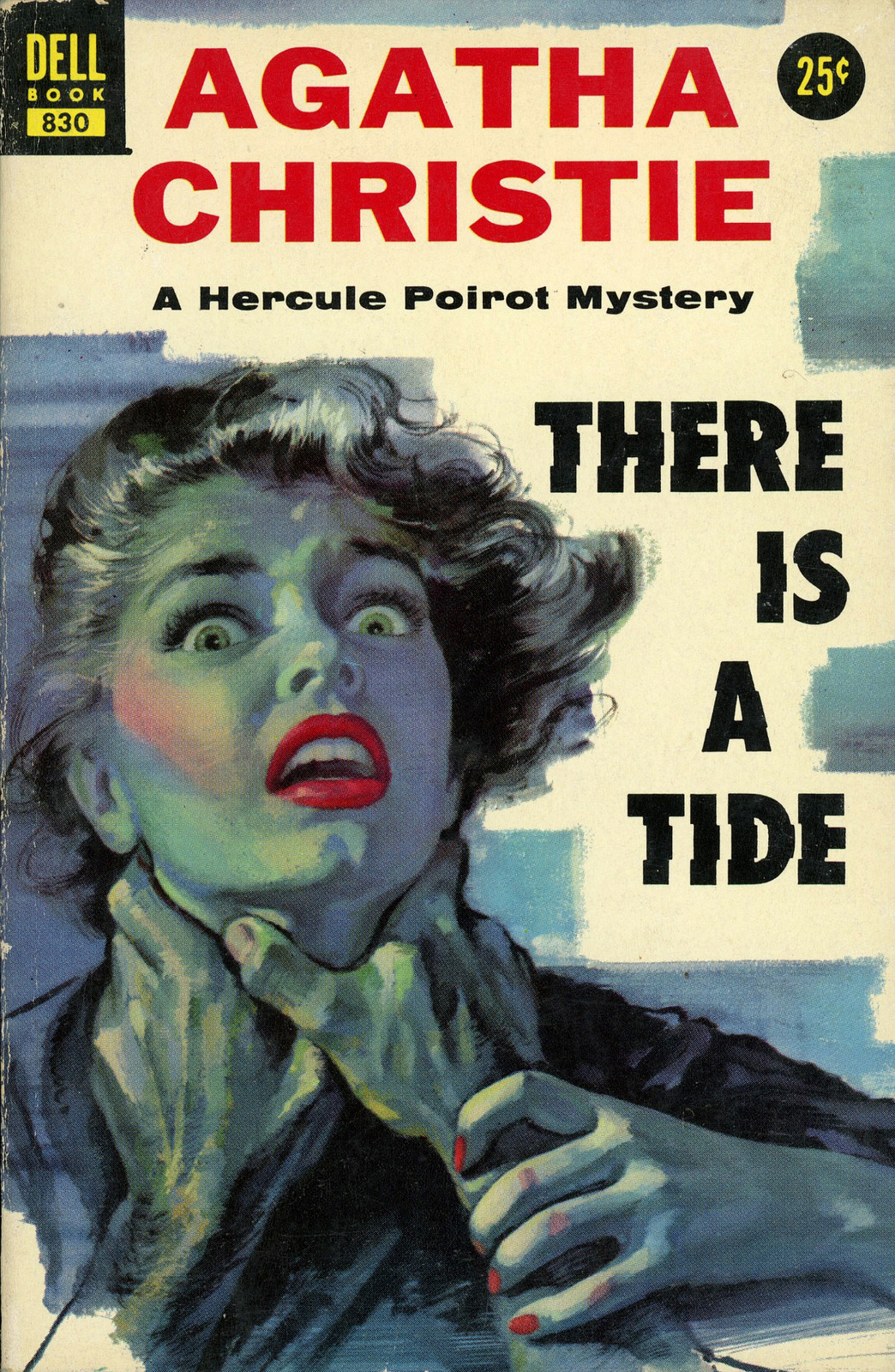
There Is a Tide (1955), Agatha Christie

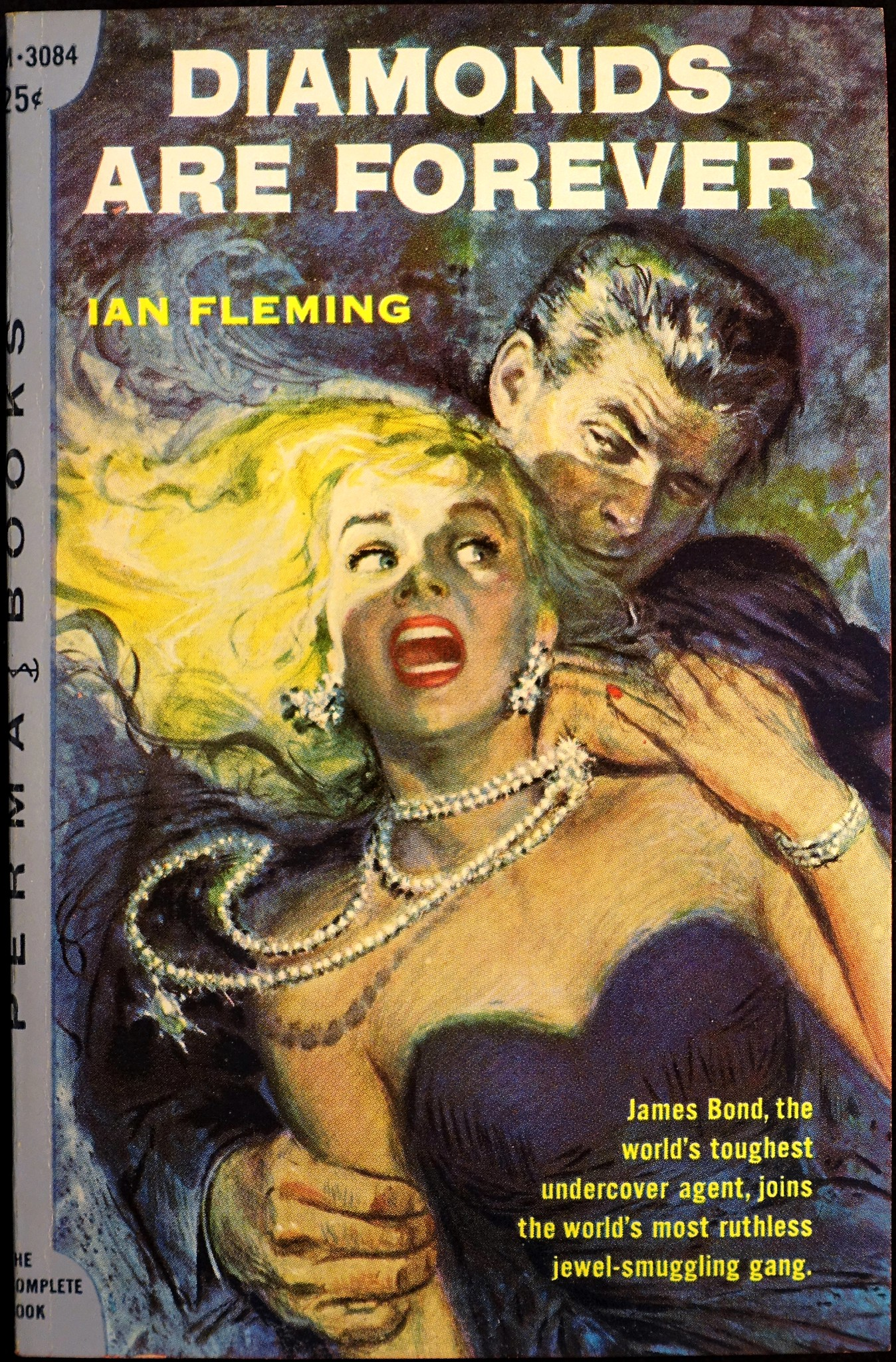
Diamonds Are Forever (1957), Ian Fleming

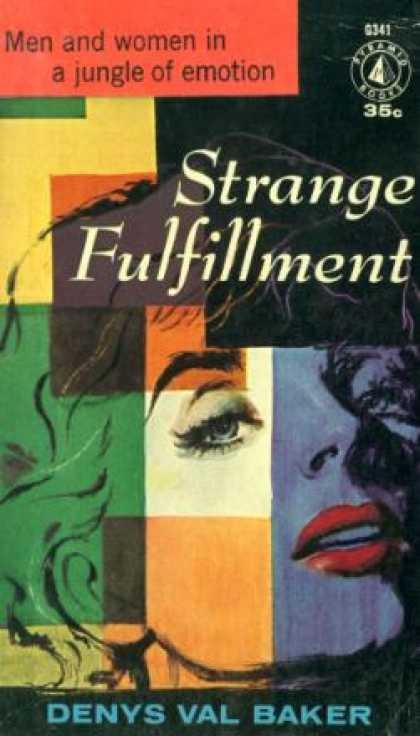
Strange Fulfillment (1958), Denys Val Baker

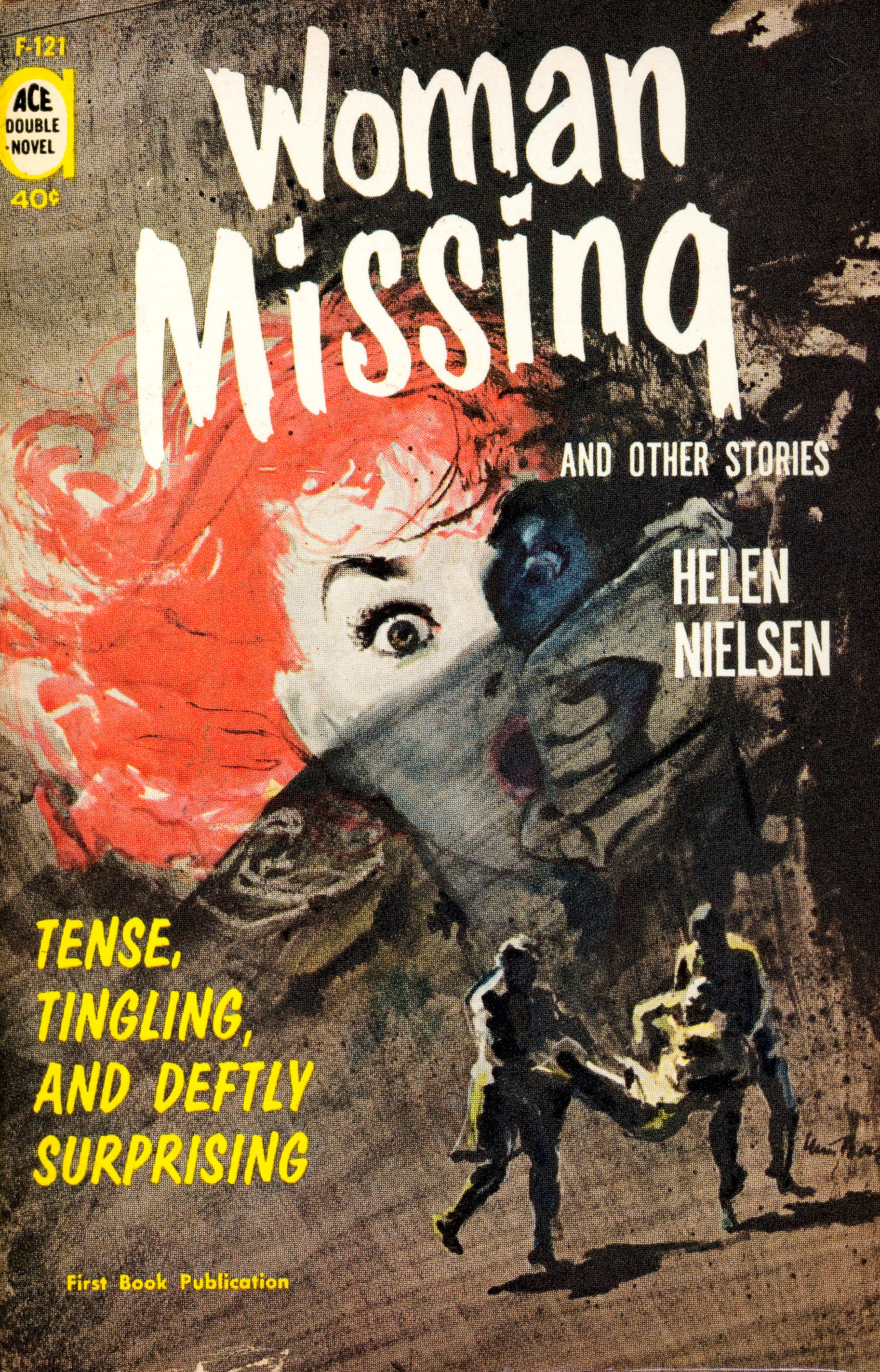
Woman Missing and Other Stories (1961), Helen Nielsen

=== List of magazine illustrations attributed to Rose ===
The list below includes magazine illustrations that have been credited to Rose in a secondary source or a version of the magazine that can be accessed online. It is not necessarily comprehensive.

Magazine illustrations by William Rose
Date		Magazine	Article or story		Ref.
Year	Pub.	Magazine	Title	Author	Ref.
1943	Oct 16, 1943	Collier's	"The Disguise"	Hamlen Hunt	
1943	Nov 20, 1943	Collier's	"George Is a Noble Guy"	William F. Jenkins	
1943	Dec 11, 1943	Collier's	"Without Security"	Elsie Taye	
1944	Feb 5, 1944	Collier's	"War Wedding" (Part 1 of 4)	Margaret Culkin Banning	
1944	Feb 12, 1944	Collier's	"War Wedding" (Part 2 of 4)	Margaret Culkin Banning	
1944	Feb 19, 1944	Collier's	"War Wedding" (Part 3 of 4)	Margaret Culkin Banning	
1944	Feb 26, 1944	Collier's	"War Wedding" (Part 4 of 4)	Margaret Culkin Banning	
1945	Mar 31, 1944	Collier's	"Person to Person"	Nancy Lyon	
1946	May 25, 1946	Collier's	"Echo of an Old Refrain"	Isabel Moore	
1946	Oct 26, 1946	Collier's	"The Genius"	Barbara Dickinson	
1947	Feb 8, 1947	Collier's	"Perfect Bride"	Faith Reyher Cook	
1947	Mar 22, 1947	Collier's	"Out-of-Town Visitor"	Walter Weir	
1947	Apr 12, 1947	Collier's	"The Blond Hairpin"	Ramona Stewart	
1949	July; 1949	Cosmopolitan	"None Before Me"	Sidney Carroll	
1949	October; 1949	Cosmopolitan	"The Perfect Couple"	Rachel Thornton	
1950	Jan 22, 1950	The American Weekly	"Anna Gould's Bitter Romance" (Note: The illustration carried the following caption: "'Yes,' Anna whispered to the romantic pleas of the titled Frenchman, as they stood before the cathedral in Quebec.")	Unknown	
1950	May; 1950	Woman's Day	"The Little Cheat"	Betty Kjelgaard	
1950	Dec 24, 1950	The American Weekly	"The Hollywood Story" (Note: The illustration depicts American actor Lon Chaney with several of his characters reflected in a vanity mirror.)	Adela Rogers St. Johns	
1951	Unknown	The American Weekly	"Gable Remembers Lombard"	Unknown	
1951	Unknown	The American Weekly	"Strike Up the Band" (Note: The illustration depicts Judy Garland and Mickey Rooney in the 1940 film Strike Up the Band.)	Unknown	
1952	November; 1952	The American Magazine	Front cover	—N/a	
1952	Nov 15, 1952	Collier's	"Weep with Me"	John Clare	
1953	May; 1953	Today's Woman	"Smartest Girl in Town?"	Faith Baldwin	
1962	July; 1962	Mike Shayne Mystery Magazine	Front cover (Note: Cover reused from Rose's illustration for the 1957 US paperback edition of Diamonds Are Forever by Ian Fleming.)	—N/a	
1962	Sep 29 1962	Woman	"The Chief Requirement"	Alec Rackowe	
1965	October; 1965	Redbook	"Sheltering a Life"	Norma Rosen	
Unknown		The American Weekly	"Sheba's Secret"	Unknown	

==== Magazine illustration gallery ====
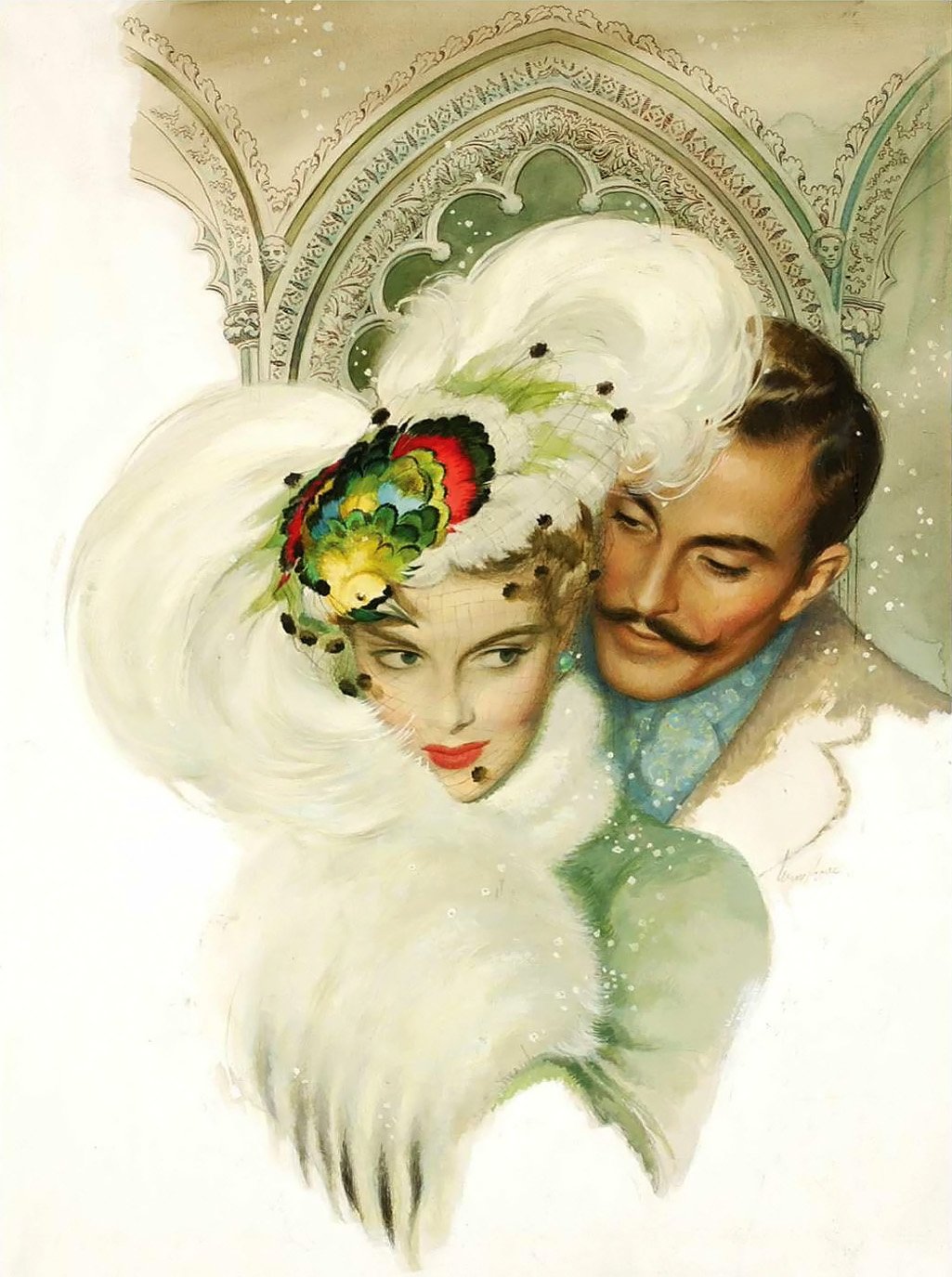
"Anna Gould's Bitter Romance" (Jan 22, 1950) – The American Weekly

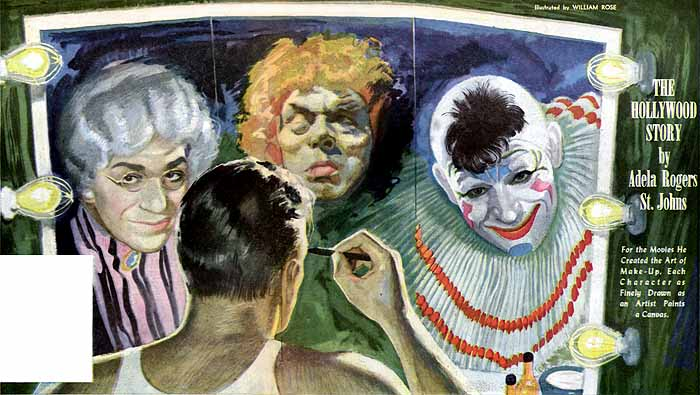
Illustration of Lon Chaney for "The Hollywood Story" (Dec 24, 1950) by Adela Rogers St. Johns – The American Weekly

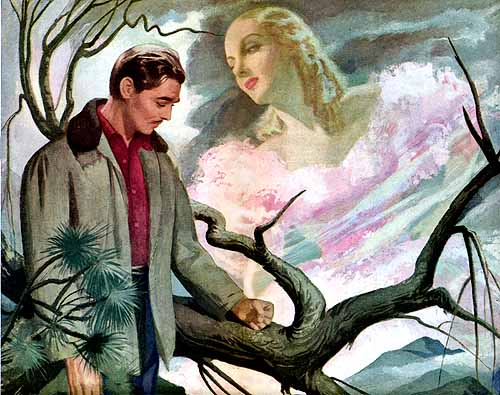
Illustration of Clark Gable and Carole Lombard for "Gable Remembers Lombard" – The American Weekly (1951)

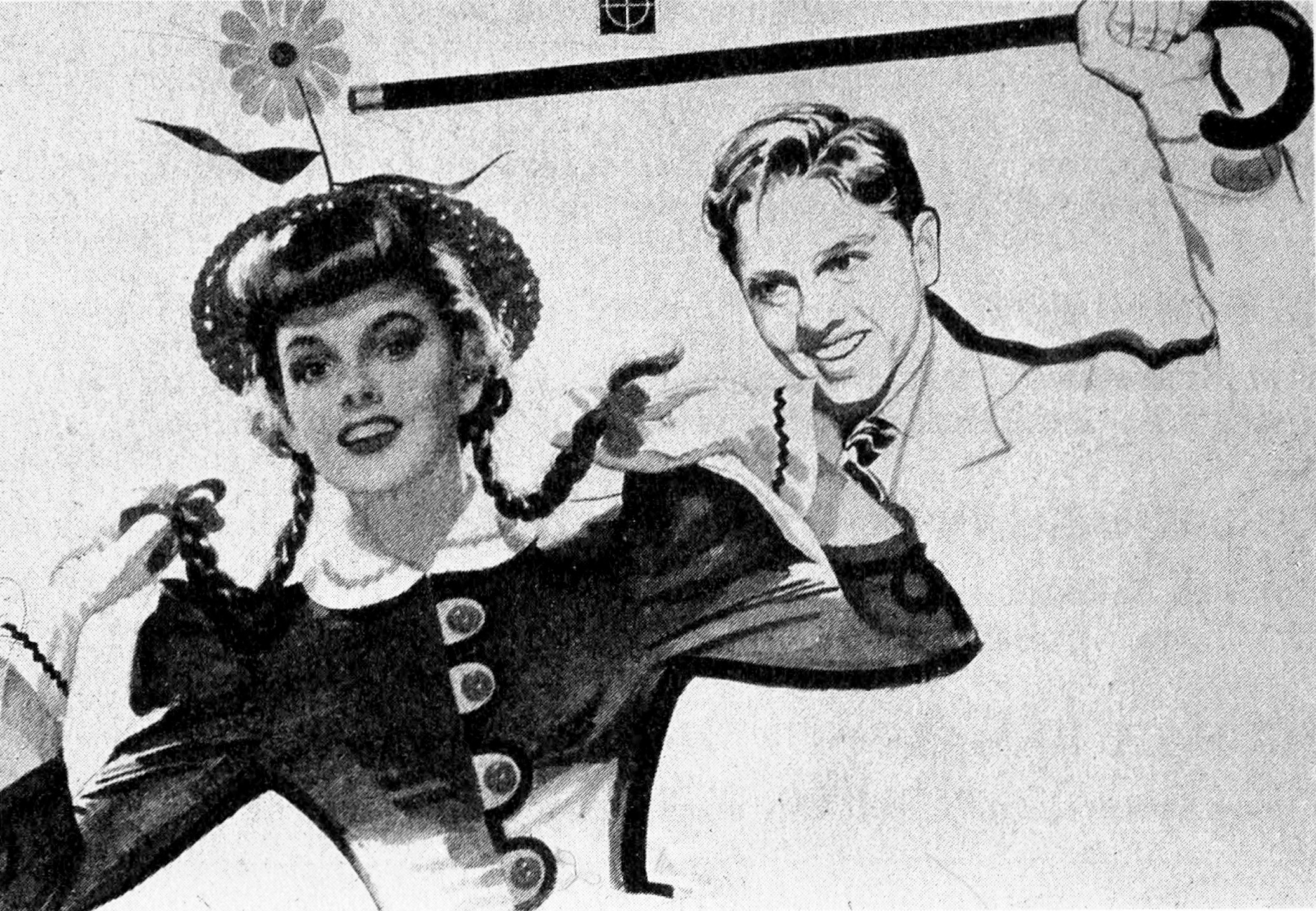
Illustration of Judy Garland and Mickey Rooney in Strike Up the Band – The American Weekly (1951)

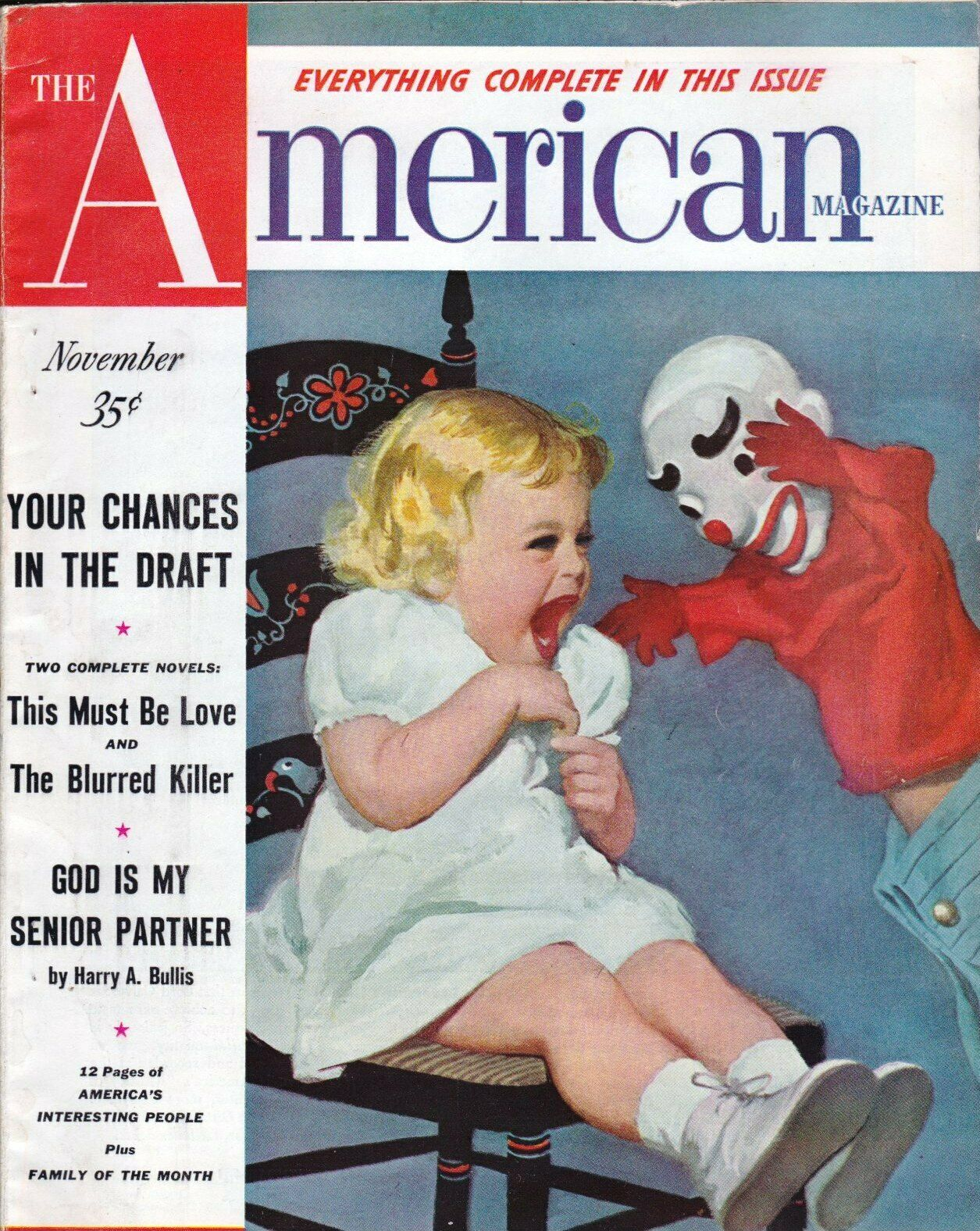
Cover of The American Magazine (November 1952 issue)

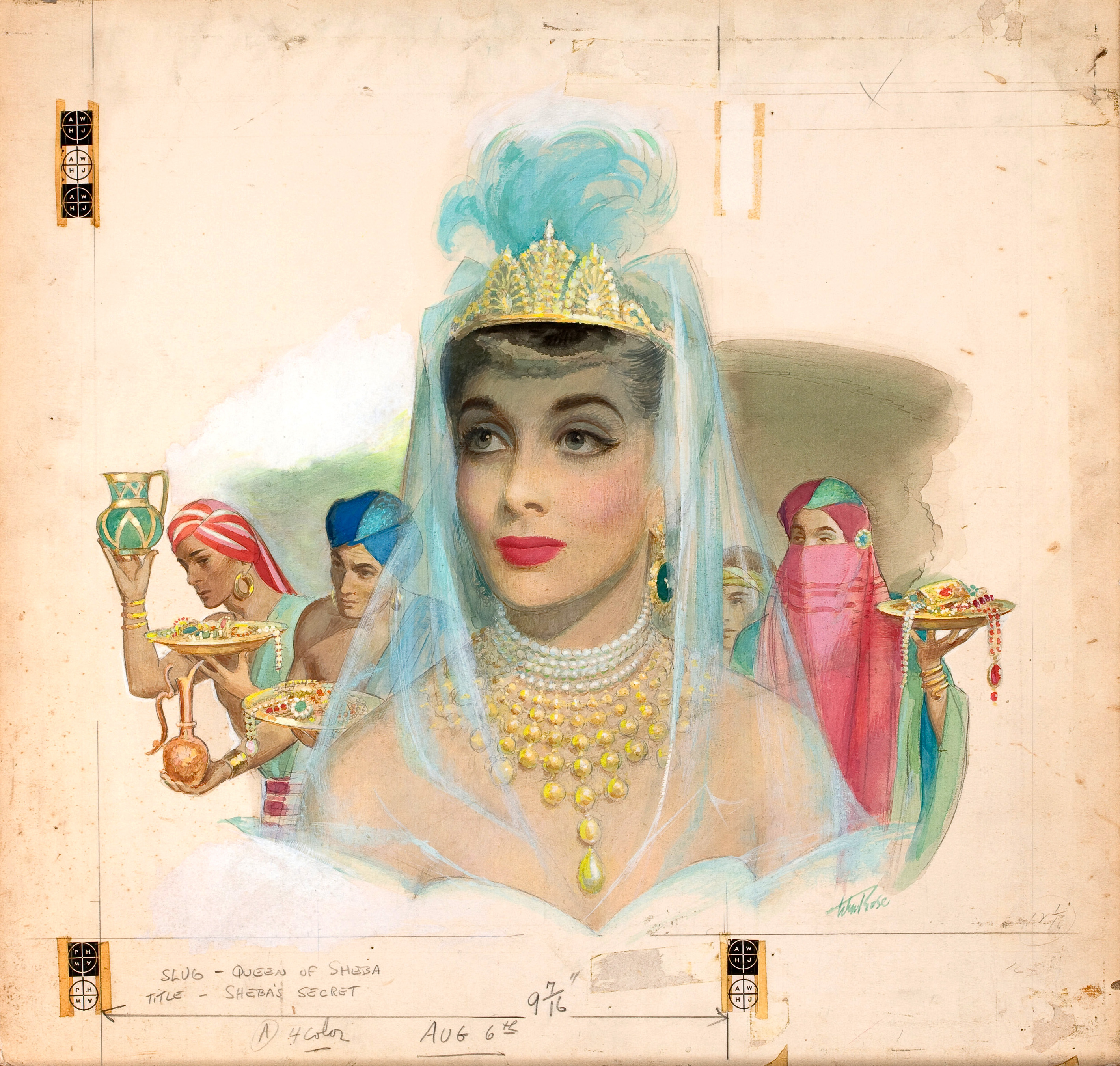
"Sheba's Secret" (date unknown) – The American Weekly

== See also ==
- Film poster, poster, and illustration
- List of RKO Pictures films
- Classical Hollywood cinema
