= Cardinal Edition =

Imprint of Pocket Books

- Parent company: Pocket Books
- Founded: 1951; 74 years ago
- Country of origin: United States
- Headquarters location: 1230 Avenue of the Americas, Rockefeller Center, New York City

Cardinal Edition is an imprint of Pocket Books.

== History ==
Cover of the 1960 Pocket Books Cardinal Edition paperback version of Colonel Hugh North Solves The Multi-Million-Dollar Murders by F. Van Wyck Mason. Cover illustration by Robert Abbett.

Pocket Books created the Cardinal editions imprint in 1951.
