= Alec Rackowe =

American romance writer

American writer Alec Rackowe (1897–1991) was a prolific author of romance and women's fiction who published numerous novels and short stories during the mid-twentieth century, including A Stylish Marriage (1948), My Lord America (1950) and All the Millionaires (1967). His works, many of which were marketed to female audiences, appeared in the magazines Redbook, Collier's, Woman, Ladies' Home Journal, McCall's, Maclean's, The Saturday Evening Post, and Good Housekeeping, among others.

== Life ==
Alexander Daudet Rackowe was born in 1897, the son of Lithuanian playwright Nahum Rakov.

Rackowe died in 1991 at age 94.

== Bibliography ==
=== Novels ===
- A Stylish Marriage (1948)
- My Lord America (1950)
- All the Millionaires (1967)

=== Short stories ===
- "Just Johnny Porter"
- "Don't Telegraph--Write!" (1936)
- "Inoculation" (1942)
- "Perfectly Normal" (1944)
- "--and a Hank of Hair" (1944)
- "I'm the Girl" (1945)
- "It Takes Two" (1947)
- "A Dog for Paula" (1947)
- "A Different Woman" (1948)
- "Window at East's" (1949)
- "A Place for Children" (1949)
- "Take me to Hollywood" (1953, illustrated by Coby Whitmore)

=== Film ===
- No Time to Marry (1938, credited as "Contract Writer")
