= Ardel Wray =

American screenwriter

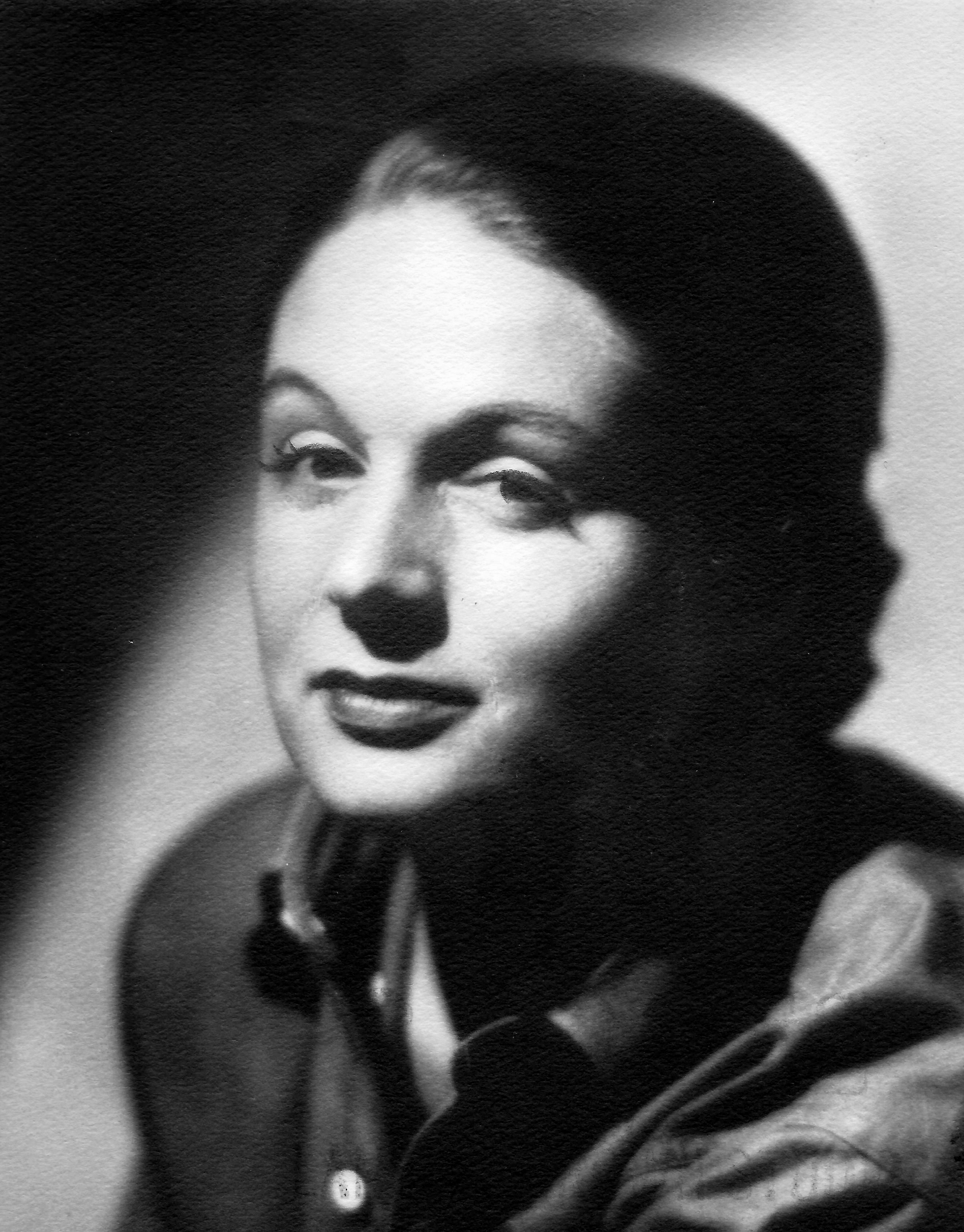
- Ardel Wray, circa 1941
- Born: Ardel Mockbee; October 28, 1907; Spokane, Washington, U.S.
- Died: October 14, 1983 (aged 75); Los Angeles, California, U.S.
- Resting place: Ashes scattered at sea
- Occupations: Screenwriter, story editor
- Years active: 1930–1972

Ardel Wray (née Mockbee; October 28, 1907 – October 14, 1983) was an American screenwriter and story editor, best known for her work on Val Lewton's classic horror films in the 1940s. Her screenplay credits from that era include I Walked with a Zombie, The Leopard Man and Isle of the Dead.

In a late second career in television, she worked as a story editor and writer at Warner Bros. on 77 Sunset Strip, The Roaring 20s, and The Travels of Jaimie McPheeters.

== Early life and career ==
Born Ardel Mockbee on October 28, 1907, in Spokane, Washington, Ardel Wray was the only child of Virginia Brissac and Eugene Mockbee, both stage actors working in West Coast stock companies in the early 1900s. When her parents separated, she was brought to live with her maternal grandparents in San Francisco while her mother continued her career. She spent most of her childhood moving back and forth between her grandparents' home and a boarding school, and was raised primarily by her grandfather, B. F. Brisac, a prominent San Francisco businessman who was a surrogate father and mentor until his death in 1940.

Divorced from Mockbee, her mother married theatre director-manager John Griffith Wray in 1915 and moved with him to Los Angeles when he accepted a directing job at the Thomas Ince Studios. Ardel came to live with them in 1922, later taking her stepfather's last name. After graduating from high school, she worked as a model for Hollywood fashion designer Howard Greer, briefly attended the University of California at Los Angeles, and lived for a while at The Rehearsal Club in New York, where she considered and ultimately rejected the idea of becoming an actress. (Note: The Rehearsal Club was a boarding house established in 1913 to support women coming to New York to work in the theatre. Mary Shaw, a New York actress and a relative of Wray's grandfather by marriage, had played a part in the founding of The Rehearsal Club and was a reference for Wray when she applied there. The Rehearsal Club was closed in 1979 but its legacy continues to be preserved by many of its most famous residents, including Blythe Danner and Carol Burnett.) She had two short-lived marriages in the decade following high school, both to California artists, Henry D. Maxwell (1928–1930) and Don Mansfield Caldwell (1933–1939). (Note: Henry Maxwell was the grandson of Nebraska Congressman and Chief Justice of the State Supreme Court Samuel Maxwell, for whom his father, Jacob Maxwell, worked. Henry's career as an artist is unnoted; however, he may be the "Earnest John Henry Maxwell" listed in Edan Hughes' compendium of "Artists in California, 1786-1940" as a cartoonist. Don Mansfield Caldwell’s paintings were exhibited in the Nicholson Gallery in Pasadena, California in 1934 and he is also listed in "Artists in California 1786-1940.")

Wray began her career working in studio story departments. In 1933, after working as a staff writer developing properties for Carl Laemmle Jr.'s reopening of Universal Studios, she went to work in the Story Department at Warner Bros. where she met Dalton Trumbo, who was also working in the department at the time. An early draft of Trumbo's novel Johnny Got His Gun with a handful of Wray's margin notes was found among her papers after she died, and anecdotes in Wray's family history suggest that she and Trumbo became "an item" for a while, but if there was a relationship beyond their shared interest in writing it did not last. Wray moved to the story department at Fox Studios in 1936, then to RKO in 1938. She and second husband Don Caldwell divorced in 1939.

== Work at RKO and Paramount ==
Sometime after starting work at RKO, Wray became involved in the Young Writers' Project, a program designed to identify and cultivate writing talent at the studio. A treatment found in her estate papers puts her in that program in 1941. (Note: Wray's 1941 treatment was titled Dover Road -- a romantic comedy set in New York and Maryland that bears some similarity to The Dover Road, an A.A. Milne play set in England and produced in London and New York in the early 1920s. Milne's play had been the basis of two movies by this time; one of them, Where Sinners Meet, produced by RKO in 1934. A New York Times article in June 1941 confirms the studio's interest in a remake set in America. The studio-bound treatment has only Wray's authorship and the date. John Humphrey, who was reported to have also been assigned to the project, did not participate. This was, most likely, a Young Writers' Project assignment.) In 1942, she was given an opportunity to work with Val Lewton, a producer of low-budget horror movies. Lewton had to recruit his production team from inside RKO, and he may have discovered Wray through her work in the Young Writers' program, but it is also possible that she was referred to him by Mark Robson, who Lewton had recruited from the editing department, along with Robert Wise.

Wray's opportunity was, in effect, a writing audition under pressure: Lewton was behind on an ambitious schedule and Wray became the second writer to try to deliver a workable script from a short story about zombies that Lewton liked. The story had been written by an Ohio journalist named Inez Wallace who had borrowed heavily from Charlotte Brontë's Jane Eyre, and Lewton wanted to capitalize on Brontë's moody and foreboding atmosphere. Wray delivered the script for I Walked with a Zombie and went on to become a regular in the Lewton group.

Her next assignment for Lewton was to write the story and screenplay for The Leopard Man based on Black Alibi, a novel by Cornell Woolrich. Later in 1943, she was loaned out to Maurice Geraghty's production group to write the story and screenplay for The Falcon and the Co-Eds, the seventh in his popular 'Falcon' detective series. (Note: A short history of Maurice Geraghty's popular Falcon detective franchise can be found at Digital Deli Too, a small website devoted to classic radio and film.) Back with the Lewton group in 1944, she developed Isle of the Dead (story and screenplay inspired by Boecklin's symbolist painting), Bedlam (historical research for a story inspired by A Rake's Progress, the paintings by William Hogarth), and wrote dialogue for Youth Runs Wild (Mark Robson's directorial debut). In 1945, she wrote an original screenplay, Blackbeard The Pirate, for an A-movie property inspired by the life of the notorious English pirate Edward Teach and set to star Boris Karloff but never produced. (Note: In Dawson's analysis of an incomplete draft of Wray's script, this unproduced Lewton project was to be a 'historical mystery' with an appearance by Blackbeard's ghost.)

Remarried and living in Hollywood, Wray left RKO shortly before she gave birth to her daughter in May 1945. Her last produced screenplay for Lewton, Isle of the Dead, was released in September of that year and the Lewton group disbanded a few months later when Lewton left RKO. (Note: Lewton's films had played a major role in returning RKO to profitability during WWII, but after the war audiences lost interest in horror movies. When Bedlam lost money, RKO did not renew Lewton's contract)

In 1948, Wray was again approached by Lewton, then at Paramount Pictures, who was trying to rescue a project he was working on about the life of Lucrezia Borgia, with Paulette Goddard set to play the title role. Paramount Pictures production records show that Wray signed a contract in February 1948 to rewrite a script written by Michael Hogan titled A Mask for Lucrezia. By the time she completed that assignment a month later, Lewton had already been taken off the project (Note: It is not certain that Lewton was the author of the fictitious explanation for the failure of A Mask for Lucrezia, but his contract was not renewed and he left Paramount a short time later, a desperate man who some suggested became the inspiration for Kirk Douglas's portrayal of Jonathan Shields, the success-driven and "slightly insane" Hollywood producer in the 1952 film The Bad and the Beautiful. Lewton subsequently tried to resurrect the old Lewton group but was ultimately rejected by partners Robson and Wise. He died of heart failure at the age of 46 in March of 1951, two years after Bride of Vengeance opened.) and Wray had been optioned to continue working at Paramount on a new Alan Ladd project (Dead Letter, eventually released as Appointment with Danger), reporting to Sydney Boehm.

=== The McCarthy Era ===
Three months before Wray signed the contract at Paramount, industry producers had issued the Waldorf Statement. In September 1948, shortly before Dead Letter and A Mask for Lucrezia were set to go into production, Wray was summoned to the business office at Paramount where, she was asked name communist sympathizers at the studio; she declined. (Note: Meetings of this kind were kept under wraps in order to avoid litigation and there is no record of it, but Paramount was most likely on a fishing expedition.) In addition to her former associates at RKO (including Trumbo, who had already been called before the HUAC), the list likely included the names of several people she was working with at Paramount, including Val Lewton (who along with Mark Robson had been under investigation by the FBI since 1945), Paulette Goddard (who had also appeared before the HUAC along with her husband Burgess Meredith), Josef Mischel (whose name was added to the Hollywood Blacklist in 1951), Robert L. Richards (whose name would appear on the Hollywood Blacklist after 1950), and Sydney Boehm (writing partner of 'Hollywood Ten' screenwriter Lester Cole who had been accused by the HUAC of putting subversive messages into scripts). Within a matter of days, the Ladd project was given to new writers, (Note: In July 1948, an article in the industry trade paper Variety reported that Wray had been assigned by Paramount to write the script for Dead Letter, along with Robert L. Richards. The film did not start shooting until summer of 1949 and was not released until May 1951, an extended delay reminiscent of Bride of Vengeance, Blackbeard, the Pirate, and other projects with blacklist-related production shakeups. Neither Wray nor Richards is credited on the film which was ultimately released under the title Appointment with Danger.) her credit for work on A Mask for Lucrezia (released as Bride of Vengeance) was removed, and she was released from her contract. Signaling the end of her career as a screenwriter, her agent severed their relationship (Note: The blacklist was an 'understood' but carefully undocumented practice; agents and agencies, the institutional go-betweens for studios and talent, were both silent partner and messenger; if they terminated a relationship in this fashion, the message was clear.) and returned all her scripts and work papers to her via U.S. Mail.

Wray's reasons for refusing to point to names on Paramount's list were not political. In recounting the experience to her daughter many years later, Wray described the person she met with as nervous and "obviously embarrassed" by what they were doing, at one point offering whispered advice that "they've already been named, dear - you won't be hurting anyone." From Wray's account, her personal knowledge as she had of Trumbo was over a decade old, and whatever was said about him or anyone else in The Hollywood Reporter was almost certainly based on gossip, if not entirely made up. (Note: Almost seventy years later, the son of William Wilkerson (founding editor of The Hollywood Reporter) acknowledged that, in publishing the list of suspected communist sympathizers ("Billy's List"), his father had been seeking revenge for his own thwarted ambition to own a studio. Most people who lost their careers at the beginning of the blacklist era, including many of the so-called Hollywood Ten, were victims of him or of more ordinary kinds of opportunism and political posturing.)

As it did for so many, Wray's decision had personal consequences as well as professional ones. Her mother (long divorced from John Wray and moving toward the end of a second career as a character actress in Hollywood) was frightened by the incident. Concerned for her own career, she did not support her daughter's decision, and publicly questioned her loyalty. (Note: Virginia Brissac's concerns for her career were not unfounded. Character actresses in Hollywood depended on their reputation for the steady stream of work required to make a living. It was a very small town in 1947, word got around quickly, and it is reasonable to assume that, fearful of being blacklisted herself, she panicked. Whether due to distancing herself from her daughter or not, Brissac's career survived and she went on to work in film and television for another eight years. [As an illustration of how small the Hollywood community was at this time: Brissac had worked with Bride of Vengeance director Mitchell Leisen on Remember the Night in 1940, and Take a Letter, Darling in 1942, and she would work with him again in 1950 on No Man of Her Own (a movie based on a novel written by Val Lewton titled "No bed of her Own"). Pursued, one of the movies she worked on in 1947, was directed by Raoul Walsh, for whom she had worked in 1941 (They Died with their Boots On) and who in 1952 would direct Blackbeard the Pirate, a revised version of the screenplay her daughter had written for the Lewton project which had been handed off to Edmund Grainger (with whom Brissac had worked in 1939 on The Forgotten Woman) following the purge of tainted projects at RKO.]) Wray's husband had just returned from serving in the Philippines in WWII and was unemployed; the situation put a strain on their marriage, which ended in divorce a few years later. Her circle of friends scattered.

Wray would not work as a screenwriter again for twelve years — a phenomenon that would come to be known as the "graylist." To support herself and her daughter, she worked as a reader in various studio story departments and took occasional side-jobs doing research and novelizing films for newspapers. She never remarried and, although she continued to look after her mother, their relationship never fully recovered from this period.

== Career in television ==
Wray had been working as a story analyst at Warner Bros. for two years when, in the summer of 1960, she was loaned out to Roy Huggins' production team to do some work on scripts for his television series Cheyenne and Maverick—a small writing contract which, although uncredited, marked the end of her tenure on the 'graylist'. (Note: Wray shared the information that "they are going to let your mother write some dialogue..." in a 'news-from-home' letter she wrote to her fifteen-year-old daughter, who was away at camp in the summer of 1960. Wray made light of it, wryly referring to western-style dialogue as "deathless prose." The significance of the news was lost on her daughter who, at the time, knew little about the House Un-American Activities Committee and nothing about the impact it had on her mother's career and their lives.) When Huggins left Warner Bros. at the end of that year, producer-director Boris Ingster hired her to be the story editor on his new series The Roaring 20s. (Note: Roy Huggins had his own encounter with McCarthyism in 1952 and had helped others get off the 'graylist'. Boris Ingster's career had not been affected, but both men took a calculated risk in orchestrating Wray's return to screenwriting, and because of them and others like them, the era of the Hollywood blacklist and graylist slowly came to an end. A few months after Huggins asked Wray to work on some scripts for him, Dalton Trumbo received screen credit under his own name for the first time in fourteen years for his screenplays for Exodus and Spartacus.)

Wray would go on to write two (credited) episodes of The Roaring 20s, and she continued to work with Ingster for the next six years as a writer and story editor on 77 Sunset Strip, The Travels of Jaimie McPheeters, and as assistant to the producer on the movie Guns of Diablo at MGM.

== Retirement and death ==
While working at MGM, Wray was diagnosed with cataracts. When her contract on Guns of Diablo ended, she returned to Warner Bros., which was closer to home and did not require driving at night, and she continued working as a story analyst there and at The Walt Disney Studios until her failing vision forced her to stop. She retired in 1972 and lived in Santa Fe, New Mexico for the next several years, an area she remembered fondly from her trip there in 1943 to find and photograph the places that would become the sets and backdrops in The Leopard Man.

Wray returned to Los Angeles in 1980, was diagnosed with breast cancer in 1983 and died on October 14, 1983, aged 75. Her mother had died only four years earlier at age 96. As she directed, her ashes were scattered at sea.

== Contribution to the Lewton legacy ==
Wray wrote three of the collection films (Note: The Val Lewton Horror Collection DVD, Warner Home Video 2005.) celebrated in Martin Scorsese’s 2007 documentary film Val Lewton: The Man in the Shadows, two of them groundbreaking screenplays that helped define the genre of the psychological thriller and establish Lewton's reputation as the master of horror. In Wray, Lewton found a writer with a gift for character development who was also willing to take on challenging or controversial subject matter: the supernatural, a serial killer, the plagues of war and superstition, and the relationships in the notorious Borgia family—all were out of the mainstream when Wray sat down to write about them. Her ability to seduce 1940s audiences into following Lewton down a path to some of the darker corners of human experience was evident in the unexpected critical and box office success of those films.

Wray was also a member of one of the most famous B-movie units at work during what is now viewed as the 'Golden Age' of Hollywood—a group whose creative energy and inventiveness made Lewton's success possible. (Note: B-movies (also known as "programmers") had to be produced quickly and cheaply to realize a profit (The Leopard Man is reported to have been produced in under a month for $150,000). The celebrity of the unit at RKO -- which included cinematographers, art directors, editors, lighting and sound engineers, and composers, as well as writers and directors -- comes mainly from the group's ability to deliver films of exceptional quality and artistry despite those limitations.) She spoke about working with the group in a conversation with her daughter many years later, a recollection that shines a clear light on the group's chemistry and skill, and the special place it held in Wray's heart:

She rarely spoke about her early career or the McCarthy era. But when I asked once what it was like working with Lewton, she smiled -- thought about it for a long moment -- and then told me about the night the group spent figuring out how to build to the first murder in The Leopard Man. (Note: This sequence in The Leopard Man follows Theresa Delgado, a local girl in a small New Mexico town who, after struggling to find her way home in the dark, is found dead outside the door of her home by her mother, who sent her into the night to run an errand as punishment and would not open the door upon her return, despite her frantic knocks. The scene is invariably remarked upon in reviews of the film, one recent reviewer describing it as "so powerful that the rest of the film seems anticlimactic.") The scene she had written was pure psychological terror, trading on very basic fears -- of the dark, of being punished unjustly, locked out of your own home, abandoned by people you trust -- and at the same time it sets up the mystery that is the premise of the entire film. They were under pressure to get this sequence right, and almost everyone was there that night. (Note: Along with Wray, the team for The Leopard Man included Jacques Tourneur (Director), Robert De Grasse (Cinematography), Mark Robson (Editor), Albert D'Agostino and Walter Keller (Art Direction), A. Roland Fields (Set Decoration), and Roy Web (Music).) The session went well into the small hours of the morning, was filled with laughter, and included a hilarious riff as one of them experimented with a set of castanets, which turned out to be the key to building the tension and suspense. They worked their way through a dozen different shot sequences before they were satisfied and, listening to her, I had the very strong impression that they would have come up with that same elegant, powerful scene even if they had been working with an A-movie budget and had more time. As Agee (Note: Reference is to James Agee, the highly regarded author and American film critic of the 1940s. Agee considered Val Lewton to be one of the three foremost creative figures working in Hollywood at the time, and his oft-quoted observation in 1946 was "I think that few people in Hollywood show in their work that they know or care half as much about movies or human beings.") so famously observed about Lewton, these were people who understood film and cared about human beings. I can still see the smile on her face as she recalled that night. -- Stefani Warren, September 2016

== Filmography ==
=== Writer ===
- I Walked with a Zombie, 1943 (screenplay) (Note: I Walked with a Zombie is Wray's first screenplay for Lewton and it is her script that went into production; however, she shares a screenplay credit with Curt Siodmak who wrote an initial draft that Lewton did not like. Credits for the film also include "original story" by Inez Wallace (an Ohio writer and entertainment columnist), who borrowed elements of her story from Charlotte Brontë's novel, Jane Eyre (uncredited).)
- The Leopard Man, 1943 (screenplay) (Note: Wray wrote the screenplay for The Leopard Man. Edward Dein wrote additional dialogue. The story is based on Black Alibi, a novel by Cornell Woolrich.)
- The Falcon and the Co-Eds, 1943 (story and screenplay) (Note: Wray is credited with both story and screenplay on 'The Falcon and the Co-Eds but shares a screenplay credit with Gerald Geraghty (a regular writer for the Falcon film franchise produced by his brother, Maurice Geraghty) who would have done a continuity polish. The series was based on the Falcon character created by Michael Arlen.^{See})
- Youth Runs Wild, 1944 (additional dialogue)
- Isle of the Dead, 1945 (written by) (Note: Wray's credit on Isle of the Dead is "written by" (a credit for both story and screenplay), with some sources including Josef Mischel and producer Val Lewton for 'uncredited' participation. In Bansak's account, Wray and Mischel were set to write an early draft together, but there is no evidence that they did, and it is more likely that Mischel stepped in and worked with Lewton to complete the project as Wray withdrew in the latter stages of her pregnancy and then left to give birth to her daughter.)
- Bride of Vengeance, 1949 (contributing writer) (uncredited) (Note: Wray's "contributing writer" credit on Bride of Vengeance (originally A Mask for Lucrezia) is a post-release correction. The reason/basis for the correction is unknown. Paramount production records show that Michael Hogan protested the screenplay credit going to Hume but was denied, that Maibaum removed Wray's name from the proposed credit list in a memo dated October 11, 1948 and was himself added to the tentative list of contributing writers a day later. Wray did not protest the original credits or request the correction.)
- Blackbeard the Pirate... original screenplay, RKO circa 1945, unproduced (Note: RKO's Blackbeard the Pirate project, developed by the Lewton group, was put on hold following the death of studio executive and Lewton supporter Charles Koerner and Lewton's subsequent release from RKO. Two years later, during Howard Hughes' purge of communist influence at RKO in 1947/48, the project was discovered by new studio executives and Wray's script was given to an independent film unit where production eventually resumed. When it was finally released in December 1952, the story had been changed but the movie had only a slightly altered title, Blackbeard, the Pirate. The RKO shooting draft of Wray's screenplay for the project was found among her papers and is thought to be one of the items returned to her in the mail following her release from Paramount in October 1948. (See also Dawson).)
- The Roaring 20s TV Series, 1961 (writer, 2 episodes)
- 77 Sunset Strip TV Series, 1963-64 (teleplay, 3 episodes)
- The Travels of Jaimie McPheeters TV series, 1964 (writer, 1 episode)
- Ritual, 2002 (1943 screenplay of I Walked with a Zombie remake) (Note: Ritual, a remake of I Walked with a Zombie produced by Bob Weinstein, Robert Zemeckis and others, was released internationally between 2001 and 2012 and distributed on DVD in the U.S. There is very little written about this remake and Wray's family has no knowledge of it; however, all the original writing credits are included in the listing along with additional screenplay credits for Rob Cohen and director Avi Nesher.)

=== Story Editor ===
- 77 Sunset Strip, 1962-1964 (TV Series)
- The Roaring 20s, 1961-1962 (TV Series)
- The Travels of Jaimie McPheeters, 1964 (TV Series)
- Guns of Diablo (1965)
