= B. F. Brisac =

American business executive and humanitarian

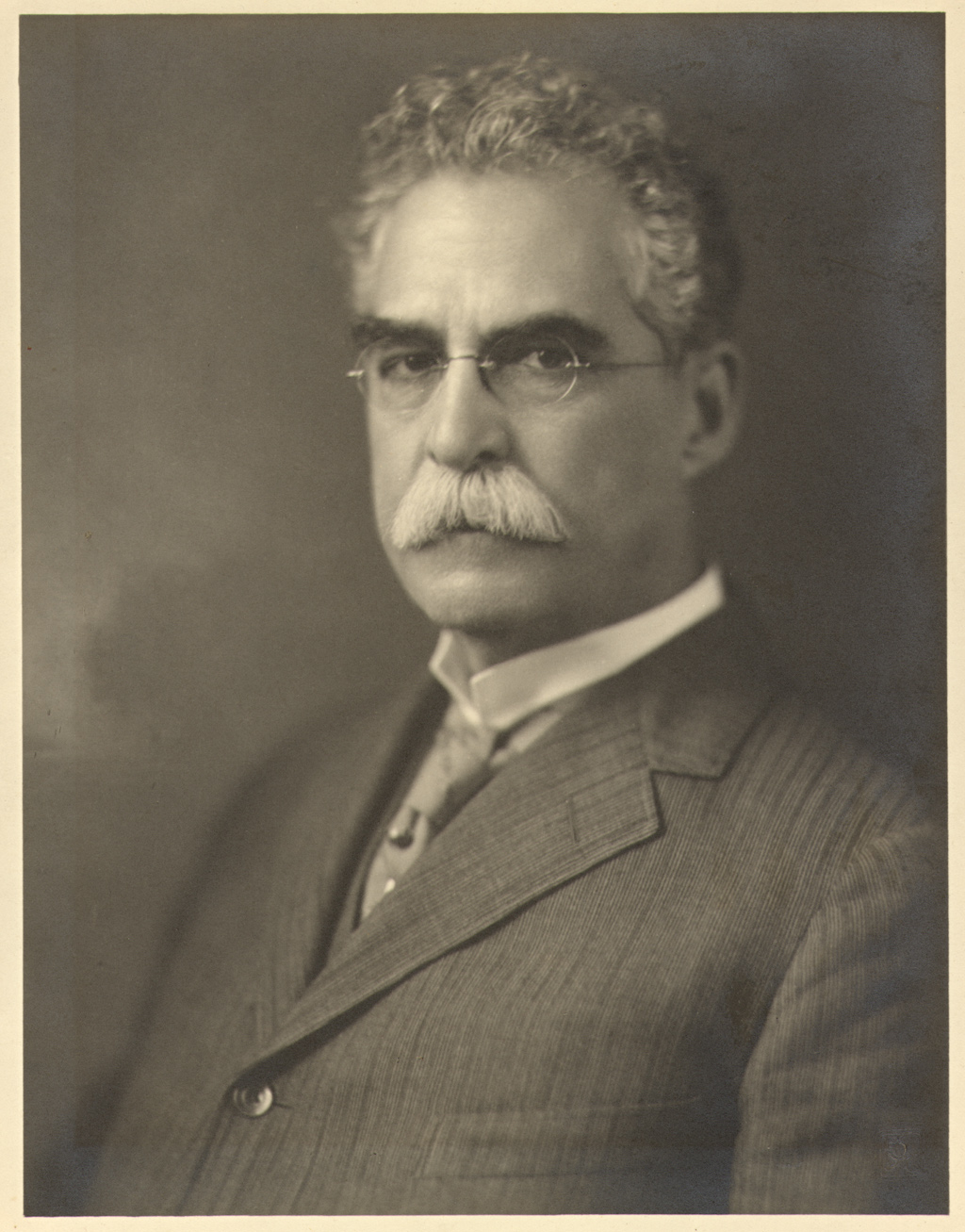
- B. F. Brisac (about 1908)
- Born: Belnore Felix Brisac; September 15, 1858; San Francisco, California, U.S.
- Died: January 6, 1940 (aged 81); San Francisco, California, U.S.
- Resting place: Ashes interred in Mt. Olivet Memorial Park Columbarium, Colma, California, U.S.
- Education: Santa Clara College
- Occupations: Insurance broker, business executive
- Years active: 1877–1940
- Spouse(s): Alice Hain (m. 1878; died 1924) Lena A. Shell (m. 1930)
- Children: 2, including Virginia Brissac
- Family: Ardel Wray (granddaughter); Mary Shaw (sister-in-law)

B. F. Brisac (September 15, 1858 – January 6, 1940) was an American business executive and humanitarian known for his work with the San Francisco Society for the Prevention of Cruelty to Animals and other humane organizations in the early 1900s.

== Early life and career ==
Brisac was born Belnore Felix Brisac in San Francisco, CA in 1858, the son of Felix and Virginia (Grain) Brisac. His father was a French expatriate in the line of the Dukes of Brissac. (Note: Brisac's father, Felix (1811–1882) is believed to have been a descendant of Timoléon de Cossé-Brissac, 9th Duke of Brissac. The family castle had been ransacked in the French Revolution and lay in ruins for half a century until a restoration project was begun by the surviving heirs of Roda de Brissac in 1844, the same year that Felix - a child of the Enlightenment - left France. Sometime after he left, Felix dropped an 's' from the spelling of his last name (he may have changed his first name as well), and became a naturalized American citizen. When Timoléon died in 1848, the ducal title went unclaimed for the next thirty-five years. In 1883, the year after Felix died, the French aristocrat and author François de Cossé Brissac assumed the title of 11th Duke of Brissac, and both the castle and the title have remained in his family ever since. In historical accounts of this lineage, Felix and his sons Camille, Norline, and Belnore are referred to only as 'successive descendants in the male line' of Timoléon de Cossé-Brissac.) His mother was the daughter of French-American painter and scenographer Fredrick Grain. (Note: Brisac's grandfather, Frederick Grain (1790–1864), was an orphaned infant son of French colonials killed in the overthrow of French rule during the Haitian Revolution of 1791. He was rescued by friends of his parents who managed to escape and take him with them to New York, where he grew up and, ultimately, became a painter. His brother Peter Grain was also a painter, as were Peter's sons, and the Grain family was described by one critic as being among the best theatre scenic artists of their day.) He had two brothers, Camille (1851–1855) and Norline (1856–1903). (Note: As Felix Brisac's eldest son after Camille (who died in childhood), Brisac's brother Norline could have assumed his inherited ducal title after his father died in 1882, but he had no interest in it. According to estate archivists at The Lilly Library (Indiana University, Bloomington): "Norline Frederick Brisac was a California born, globe-trotting, would-be actor and bonvivant whose irresponsible lifestyle earned the disapproval of his wealthy father, who eventually refused to continue to fund his son's 'educational expenses'. He was briefly married to the actress Mary Shaw.")

Known professionally as B. F. Brisac, Belnore began his career working for Murphy Grant & Company (importers and jobbers of dry goods) in San Francisco in 1877. When his father died in 1882, he went to work as an insurance solicitor with The Liverpool & London & Globe Insurance Company (LLG), filling the position his father had held there. He later became a broker and continued his affiliation with LLG for the next thirty years. (Note: Letter of reference (Murphy Grant & Company, January 20, 1882) and Offer letter (Resident Secretary of Liverpool & London & Globe Insurance Company, January 20, 1882). In Virginia Brissac estate records.)

Brisac also invested time and money in Bay area development ventures. A proponent of the modern Olympic Movement, he joined and later became a director of the Olympic Club. He owned stock in the Olympic Salt Water Company (1894) and was vice president and general manager of the Boulder Creek Electric Light and Water Company which he helped found in 1903.

=== Work on insurance reforms ===
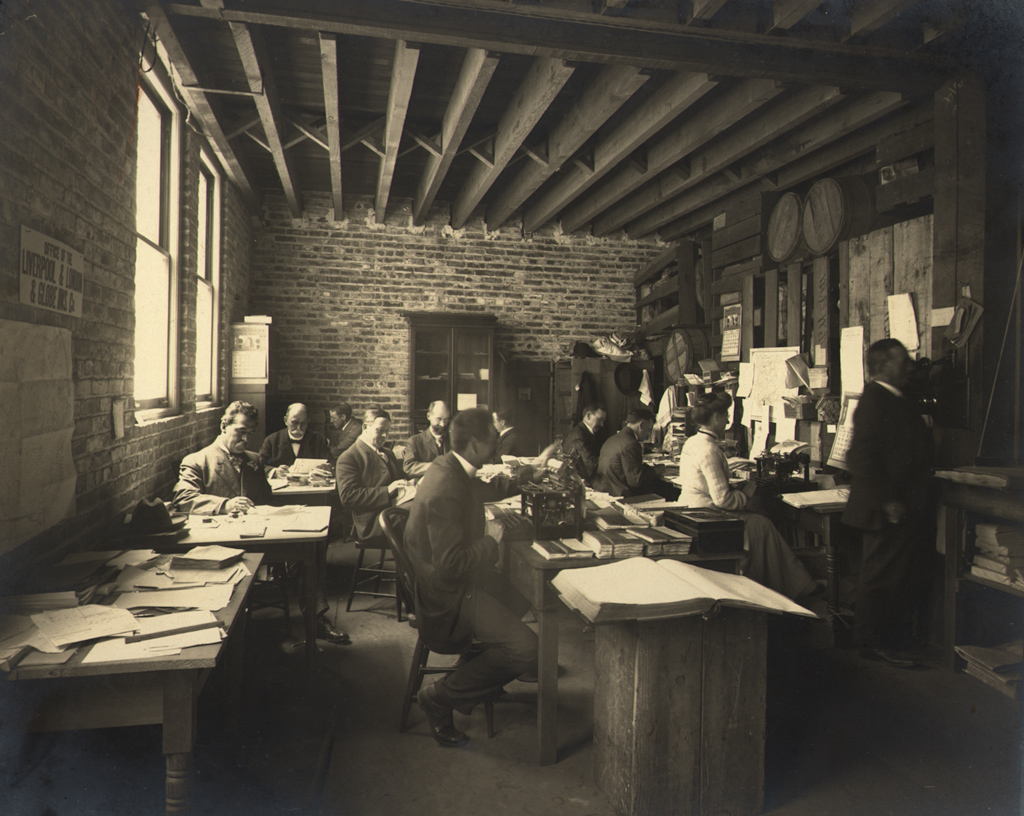
B. F. Brisac (left) with others working in the basement of the damaged offices of Liverpool & London & Globe Insurance company after the San Francisco Earthquake and Fire in 1906.

Following the San Francisco earthquake and fire in 1906, many wealthy families abandoned the city, some never to return; Brisac chose to stay. Working from the basement of their damaged office building, he and others at LLG began processing insurance claims within days of the fire being put out. The mayor of San Francisco had declared martial law and issued a shoot-to-kill order for looters. To speed the payouts that would allow families to keep their property, Brisac secured a pass from the mayor and for weeks traversed San Francisco with a money belt and a pistol for self-protection while paying off claims.

The massive earthquake damage, and the rampant fraud following the fire combined to force many insurance companies to go bankrupt or abandon policy holders, but Liverpool & London & Globe survived and Brisac became an advocate for insurance reforms, working as a member and later chairman of the board of governors of the Insurance Broker's Exchange of San Francisco.

Brisac was involved in San Francisco's reconstruction efforts for over a decade. In 1914, he chaired the Insurance Broker's Committee of the World's Insurance Congress, and invested in the 1914 Panama–Pacific International Exposition, and he continued to contribute to disaster relief efforts such as the 1918 San Jacinto Earthquake Fund.

Along with other survivors, Brisac struggled to come to terms with the death and destruction caused by the earthquake, and he found consolation in the teachings of the new Christian Science. In 1908, he introduced Christian Science lecturer F. H. Leonard to a crowd of 4000 in the Dreamland Rink auditorium in San Francisco. Acknowledging the large turnout, Brisac proposed that the question on everyone's mind was “What is there in it?” and suggested that it offered what humanity was missing – “...reconciliation with god.” In 1913, he was elected First Reader in the newly built San Francisco First Church of Christ, Scientist.

=== Work with humane organizations ===
Brisac grew up in the waning days of the California Gold Rush and witnessed the routine abuse of dray horses and mules on San Francisco streets, and he had known about the work of the Society for the Prevention of Cruelty to Animals since its founding in 1868. But his involvement with the group didn't begin until the aftermath of the earthquake in 1906, where he assisted in the rescue of trapped and injured animals and helped build water troughs for the horses used in rescue and reconstruction. He joined the society in 1907 and was active for the rest of his life, as a member (1907–1916), trustee (1916–1930), and president (1930–1940). At the time of his death, he was also first vice-president, formerly president of the State Humane Association of California and director of the American Humane Association active in American Red Star Rescue and Animal Relief.

== Family life and later years ==
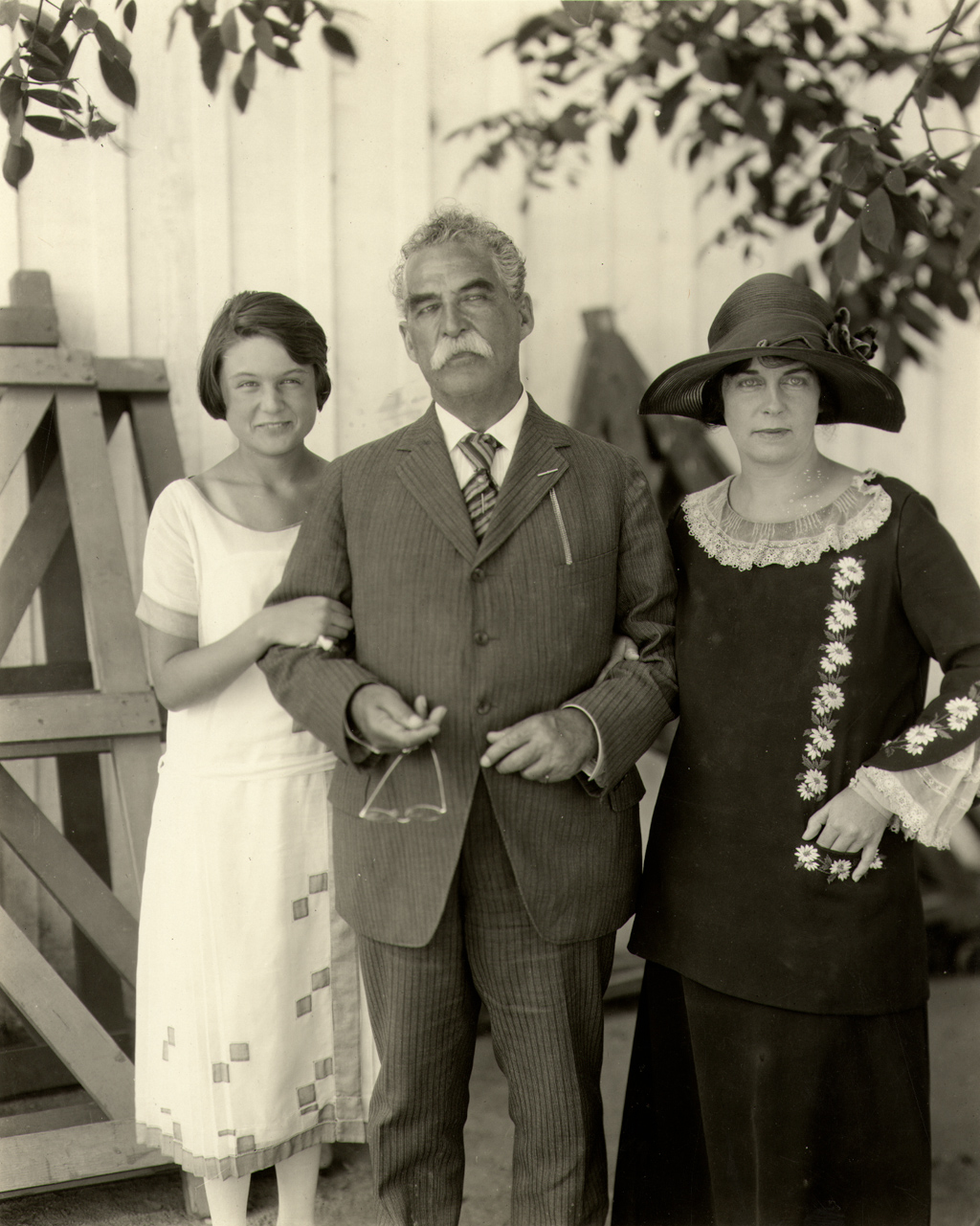
B. F. Brisac with daughter Virginia Brissac (right) and granddaughter Ardel Wray (left), around 1922.

Brisac married Alice M. Hain in 1878 and they had two children - Virginia, born in 1883, and Belnore Brisac, Jr. born in 1888.

When Virginia was nineteen, Brisac and his wife were persuaded by friend and local theatre impresario Reginald Travers to allow her to act professionally. She quickly became a headliner on the West Coast Stock theatre circuit and, in April 1906, married an actor she met while on tour in Los Angeles, California. When the marriage failed in 1911, Brisac made a home for Virginia's four-year-old daughter, Ardel, who lived with them for over ten years before finally rejoining her mother in 1922. Brisac continued to be a surrogate father and mentor to his granddaughter until his death in 1940. (Note: Theatre ran in Brisac's family. As a young girl growing up in Texas, his wife Alice had been interested in acting and passed that interest on to her children. His brother, Norline - a "would-be actor" and sometime stage manager for Sarah Bernhardt - seeded his niece's interest with autographed photo postcards of famous actors. Daughter Virginia went on to become the professional stage and screen actress Virginia Brissac (adopting the original French spelling of the family name for her stage name). Belnore Brisac, Jr. sang and was involved in occasional amateur theatricals throughout his life, and Virginia's daughter became the Hollywood screenwriter and story editor, Ardel Wray, known for the screenplays for I Walked with a Zombie, The Leopard Man and Isle of the Dead. Although supportive, there is no evidence that B. F. Brisac himself had any interest in it.)

Alice Brisac died in 1924 after a long illness. B. F. remarried in 1930, and he and his second wife continued living in San Francisco until his death ten years later.

== Death and tribute ==
Upon his death on January 6, 1940, the Board of Trustees of The San Francisco Society for the Prevention of Cruelty to Animals paid tribute to Brisac in a resolution which read in part: “His was a long, full and beneficent life. Kindness for his fellow men and a deep sense of consideration and responsibility for the welfare of helpless creatures were primary precepts upon which he based his conduct and living. As a humanitarian, his loss will be felt throughout the entire country.”

His ashes were interred in the Brisac family niche, along with those of his wife and others in his family, in the Columbarium at the Mt. Olivet Memorial Park in Colma, California, outside of San Francisco.
