= The Falcon and the Co-eds =

1943 film by William Clemens

- Film poster
- Directed by: William Clemens
- Screenplay by: Gerald Geraghty; Ardel Wray
- Story by: Ardel Wray
- Based on: Characters created by Michael Arlen
- Produced by: Maurice Geraghty
- Starring: Tom Conway; Jean Brooks; Amelita Ward; Rita Corday
- Cinematography: J. Roy Hunt
- Edited by: Theron Warth
- Music by: C. Bakaleinikoff
- Production company: RKO Radio Pictures Inc.
- Distributed by: RKO Radio Pictures
- Release date: November 10, 1943
- Running time: 67 min.
- Country: United States
- Language: English

The Falcon and the Co-eds is a 1943 film directed by William Clemens, and produced by Maurice Geraghty, the same team that had worked on The Falcon in Danger (1943) and would stay together for the next film in The Falcon series (this entry being the seventh of 16 in the series). The story and screenplay was by Ardel Wray, a frequent collaborator with Val Lewton in his RKO horror series, who added supernatural elements to the proceedings.

As he had in the past three Falcon films, Tom Conway played the suave amateur sleuth Tom Lawrence, this time backed up by a bevy of young starlets, including Jean Brooks, Rita Corday and Amelita Ward.

== Plot ==
Jane Harris, a student at the Bluecliff Seminary for Girls, asks Tom Lawrence, aka the Falcon, for his help to investigate a death predicted by her unstable roommate, Marguerita Serena, a clairvoyant. Professor Jamison has recently died, with uncertainty as to whether it was suicide or homicide. The Falcon gets a ride from town to the seminary with the three daughters of the caretaker, the "Ughs", by the school driver.

Posing as an insurance investigator, the Falcon meets the Dean Miss Keyes, the school's psychology teacher Dr. Anatole Graelich, drama teacher Vicky Gaines and music teacher Mary Phoebus. Inspector Timothy Donovan and Detective Bates are also looking at the local coroner's verdict of suicide.

The Falcon begins his investigation in Professor Jamison's room and then goes to the undertaker's, where he finds out it is assumed Professor Jamison committed suicide by taking an overdose of sleeping pills. Believing the death was murder, a group of suspects are carefully watched by the Falcon, including Marguerita, who thinks she has inherited her father's insanity, and a love triangle involving Graelich, Mary and Vicky, all with motives for murder.

Before the Falcon can confront the killer, Miss Keyes is murdered and when Marguerita tells Mary that she saw her standing over the dead body of Miss Keyes, Mary tries to force the hysterical Marguerita to jump from the cliffs by the school. Tom races to the cliffs and startles Mary, who topples to her death. She had been behind all the murders, starting with Jamison who was killed in a jealous rage and Miss Keys, who would have dismissed Graelich, whom Mary had married in secret, as married couples could not work at the school.

Later, Jane's mother Maya, a famous actress, arrives at the school with Sutton Lee, another actress who asks the Falcon to solve a murder at the theater.

== Cast ==
- Tom Conway as Tom Lawrence
- Jean Brooks as Vicky Gaines
- Rita Corday as Marguerita Serena
- Amelita Ward as Jane Harris
- Isabel Jewell as Mary Phoebus
- George Givot as Dr. Anatole Graelich
- Cliff Clark as Inspector Timothy Donovan
- Edward Gargan as Detective Bates
- Barbara Brown as Miss Keyes
- Ruth Álvarez as First Ugh
- Juanita Álvarez as Second Ugh
- Nancy McCollum as Third Ugh
- Patti Brill as Beanie Smith
- Olin Howland as Bluecliff Driver
- Dorothy Christy as Maya Harris
- Dorothy Malone as Dorothy (Note: Dorothy Malone appeared in her first credited role.)
- Ian Wolfe as Undertaker
- Margie Stewart as Pan

== Production ==
Principal photography on The Falcon and the Co-eds took place from August 17 to mid-September 1943. The growing popularity of The Falcon series led to filming two films nearly back-to-back, with the previous film in the series, The Falcon in Danger, in production from April 13 to early May 1943. The last scene in the earlier film foretells the Falcon (Tom Conway) accepting a job to help a pretty student, setting up the story of The Falcon and the Co-eds. Amusingly, the title is a misnomer. Since Bluecliff is an all-girls school, the students are by definition not co-eds.

== Soundtrack ==
- "Oh Dear! What Can the Matter Be?"
  (aka "Johnny So Long at the Fair") (uncredited)
  Traditional
  Arranged by Dave Dreyer
  Sung by Ruth Álvarez, Nita Hunter, and Nancy McCollum
- "Can't Take the Brooklyn Out of Me"
  (uncredited)
  Sung by Amelita Ward
- "I Get The Neck Of The Chicken"
  Written by Frank Loesser and Jimmy McHugh

== Reception ==
Film historians Richard Jewell and Vernon Harbin described The Falcon and the Co-eds as handicapped by a "twisting and turning narrative" that revealed a "sloppiness". In a retrospective review for the Time Out Film Guide, Tom Milne wrote, "Despite the off-putting title, an attractive little thriller in which the Falcon investigates murder in a girls' school, where an atmosphere of fear and loathing centres on a girl with second sight, while she herself is driven to suicidal despair by her predictions of murder. Scripted by Ardel Wray, who worked regularly with Val Lewton (I Walked with a Zombie, The Leopard Man, Isle of the Dead), it is beautifully characterized and has some vividly eerie touches (better exploited in Roy Hunt's camerawork than by Clemens' direction). It's one of the best in a series ..."

== External list ==
- The Falcon and the Co-eds at IMDb
- The Falcon and the Co-eds at the TCM Movie Database (archived)
- The Falcon and the Co-eds at the AFI Catalog of Feature Films
