= Virginia Brissac =

American actress (1883–1979)

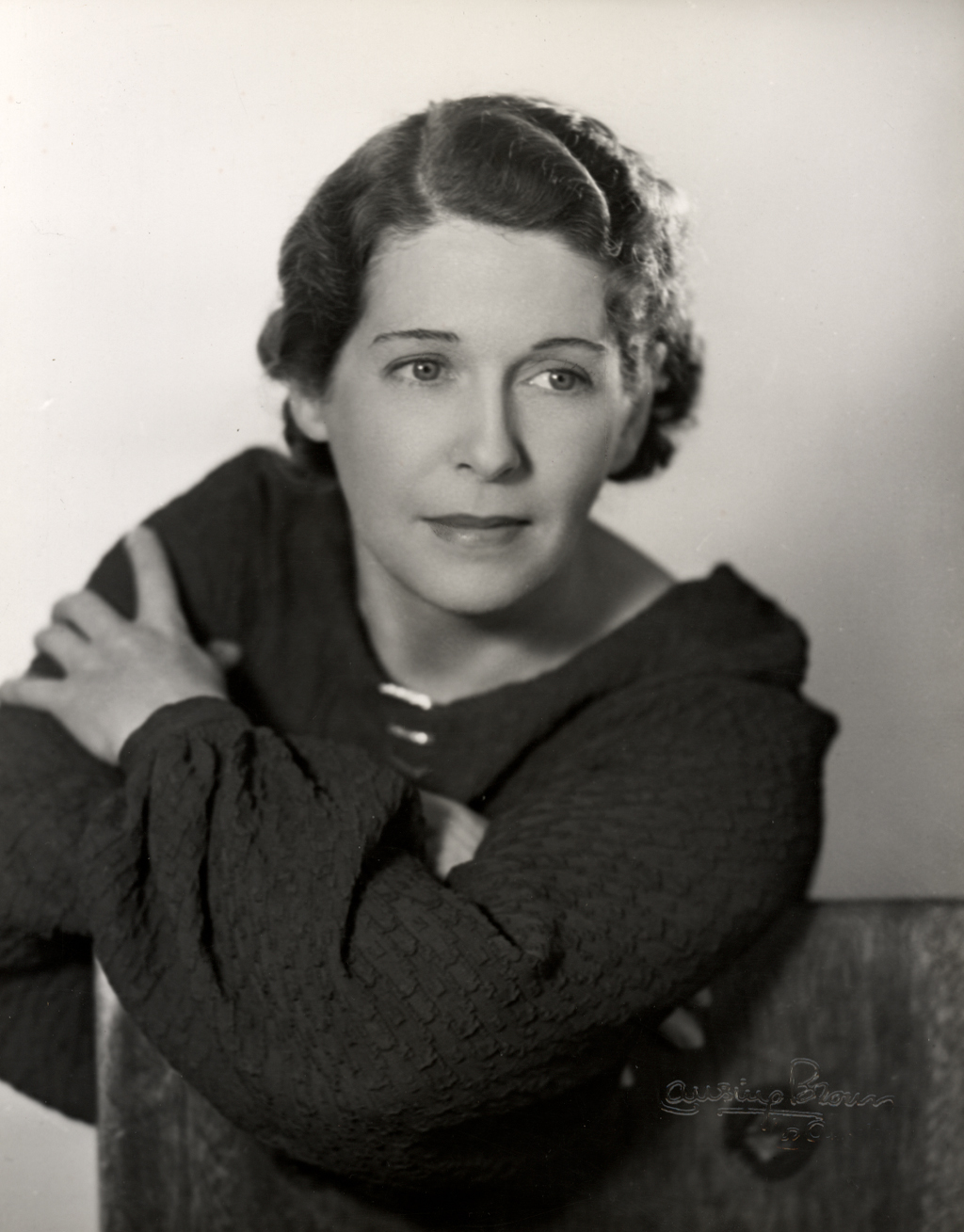
- Virginia Brissac c. 1938
- Born: Virginia Alice Brisac; June 11, 1883; San Jose, California, U.S.
- Died: July 26, 1979 (aged 96); Santa Fe, New Mexico, U.S.
- Resting place: Ashes interred in Mt. Olivet Memorial Park Columbarium, Colma, California, U.S.
- Occupation: Actress
- Years active: 1903–1955
- Spouses: Eugene D. Mockbee (m. 1906; div. 1912) John Griffith Wray (m. 1915; div. 1927)
- Children: Ardel Wray (née Mockbee)
- Father: B. F. Brisac
- Relatives: Mary Shaw (aunt)

Virginia Brissac (June 11, 1883 – July 26, 1979) was an American stage actress who headlined theatre companies from Vancouver to San Diego during the heyday of West Coast Stock in the early 1900s. An ingénue and leading lady known for her natural style and charm on stage, Brissac played with equal success in both comedies and dramas and went on to have a long second career as a character actress in film and television.

In addition to playing mothers, grandmothers, and confidants to film stars such as Bette Davis (in The Little Foxes and Dark Victory), Tyrone Power (in Captain from Castile), and John Wayne (in Operation Pacific), Brissac was cast as farm women and rancher's wives (Jesse James, The Daltons Ride Again, State Fair), aristocrats and society women (The Phantom of the Rue Morgue, Old Los Angeles, Executive Suite), and various nurses, seamstresses, and landladies. She is probably best remembered for her role as the grandmother of Jim Stark, the troubled teenager played by James Dean in Rebel Without a Cause.

== Early life ==
Born in San Jose, California, and later raised in San Francisco, Brissac was the daughter of the prominent Bay Area insurance executive and humanitarian, B. F. Brisac and his wife Alice (née Hain). She was introduced to the theatre as a young girl by her aunt and uncle, New York actress Mary Shaw and husband Norline Brissac, who was the stage manager for Sarah Bernhardt on her early tours in San Francisco and other American cities.

As Brissac's interest in theatre grew, so did her collection of autographs, which eventually included signed daguerreotypes, not only of Bernardt, but of Eleonora Duse, Richard Mansfield, Henry Irving, and many other popular actors of the day. She was also a fan of author and poet Rudyard Kipling, and when she wrote asking for his signature, Kipling's secretary wrote back informing her that the writer would grant her request if she would be willing to donate $2.50 to a certain London charity. In her reply some weeks later, Brissac wrote:

Enclosed is the $2.50 for your Fresh Air Fund. I suppose you thought that when I saw $2.50 I’d give up the idea of your autograph, but I didn’t. You see I have had to save for soldiers here, for we have wars of our own once in a while, and as I’m only a little school girl with an income of 50 cents a week, you can see it has taken me some time to get the $2.50 together. But here it is and I am waiting for your autograph.

In India at the time, Kipling eventually obliged her with his autograph and, acknowledging her letter in his reply, included these lines from his poem In the Neolithic Age:

But my Totem saw the shame; from his ridgepole-shrine he came, And he told me in a vision of the night: – 'There are nine and sixty ways of constructing tribal lays, And every single one of them is right!'

== Stage career ==
Brissac's acting career was launched through the efforts of Reginald Travers (c. 1879–1952), a San Francisco Bay area stage actor and little theatre impresario. Active in civic affairs and a friend of B.F. Brissac, Travers saw talent in Virginia and convinced her father to let him give her lessons in elocution. In 1902, the two performed at a church benefit in a specialty act billed as 'Reginald and Virginia Brissac Travers' (a publicity ruse to suggest a brother-and-sister act to attract family-oriented churchgoers), and a month later they starred together at San Francisco's Fischer's Theatre in a hit farce entitled A Pair of Lunatics. She was a hit in both and eventually Travers convinced Brissac's parents to let her act professionally.

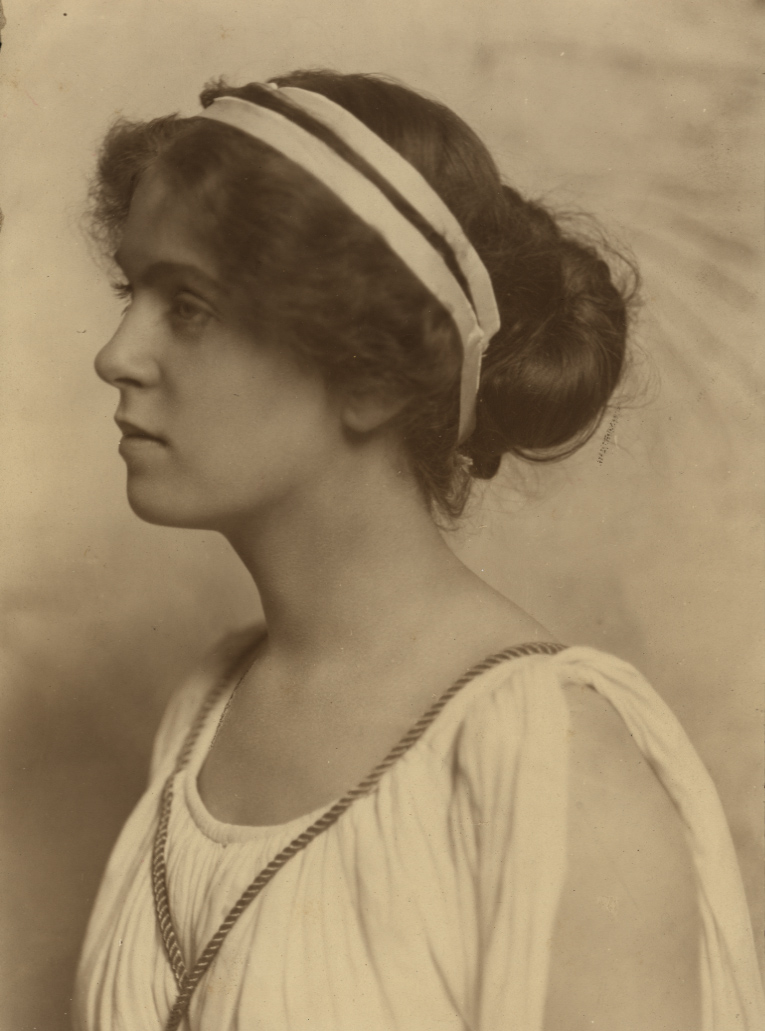
Virginia Brissac (c.1903)

By 1903, Brissac was performing with Ralph Stuart's company playing Constance in a stage adaptation of The Three Musketeers at the Theatre Republic in San Francisco, and later that year she appeared with Florence Roberts at the Alcazar Theatre performing ingénue roles in Welcome Home and Gabriele d'Annunzio's La Gioconda. After touring with Roberts' company, Brissac returned to the Alcazar, appearing in June 1904 with actor White Whittlesey in Soldier of Fortune, and again that August in Clyde Fitch's Nathan Hale.

In 1905, her growing fame spread to Southern California where she played Caroline Mitford in the William Gillette play Secret Service and the title role in Leo Ditrichstein's Vivian's Pappas, both staged at the Belasco Theatre in Los Angeles. The following February, she was declared a hit by The Los Angeles Herald for her portrayal of Tweeny in Paul Kester's Sweet Nell of Old Drury at the Mason Opera House, certifying her as a darling of the West Coast Stock circuit at the age of twenty-two.

=== 1906–1911 ===
In July 1906, aged 23, Brissac married Eugene D. Mockbee, an actor she had met while working with the Belasco players in Los Angeles. In the aftermath of the San Francisco earthquake and fire, a return to San Francisco theatres was not possible and they moved to Spokane, Washington, where Brissac rejoined Florence Roberts’ company, touring Denver, St. Louis and cities in the Pacific Northwest in The Strength of the Weak, a play written by Alice M. Smith and Charlotte Thompson.

Early in 1907, Brissac became pregnant and, awaiting the birth of her child, joined the Jessie Shirley Company, a local troupe in residence at the Auditorium Theatre in Spokane, appearing in productions of Lady Windermere’s Fan, A Bachelor’s Housekeeper, A Man of Her Choice, The Two Orphans and The Triumph of Betty.

Mockbee's career had been less successful and, after the arrival of their daughter, Ardel, in October 1907, Brissac continued working in Spokane for a second season. That December, she joined the Curtiss Comedy Company at Spokane's Columbia Theatre, playing leading roles in The Life of an Actress, In the Palace of the King, The Transgressors, By Right of Sword, Ten Nights in a Bar-Room, Deadwood Dick's Last Shot, The Banker, the Thief and the Girl, Old Heidelberg and The Land of Cotton. She appeared with Grant Churchill in a vaudeville act titled The Billionaire at the Pantages Theatre, and in May 1908 she and Mockbee opened Spokane's new Natatorium Park theatre. Billed as 'Miss Virginia Brissac and Summer Stock Company', they would play together for the last time there, finishing the Natatorium's 1907/08 season in productions of Sweet Clover, Troubles, Where Men are Game, School Days, Kathleen of Erin and Home Sweet Home.

Her success in Spokane led Brissac to a year long run in Vancouver, Canada, and then back to Northern California, where she opened theatres in San Jose and Santa Clara, finally returning home to San Francisco in March 1911. Now separated from Mockbee, she left her daughter in the care of her parents and, after a brief appearance back at the Alcazar supporting Max Figman in Mary Jane's Pa, she returned to Washington in June 1911 to star in the Hal Reid play Human Hearts at the Seattle Theatre, and later opened in nearby Tacoma, starring in A Yankee Doodle Boy with the Pringle Stock Company at the Tacoma Theatre.

=== 1912–1917 ===
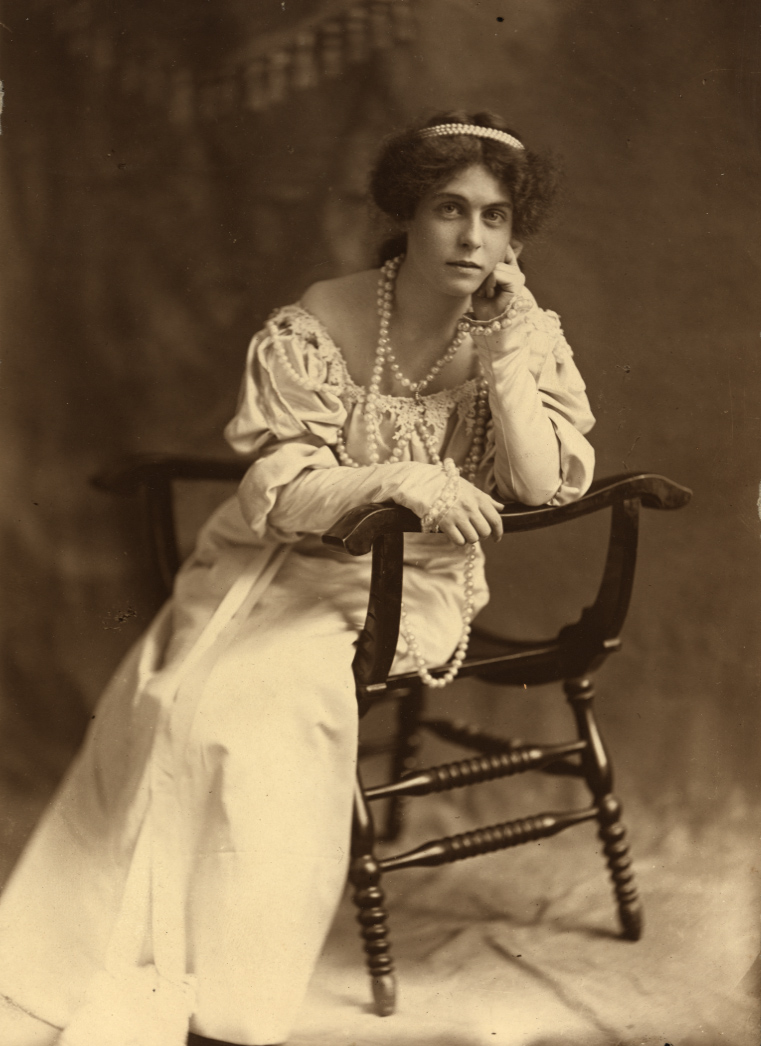
Virginia Brissac (c.1912)

Late in 1911, Brissac began a tour of Southern California theatres, appearing in productions at The Burbank Theatre in Los Angeles, the Boston Theatre in Long Beach and headlining for the opening of the Savoy and Grand Theatres in San Diego. Playing tragic heroines such as Juliet in Shakespeare's Romeo and Juliet and the title role in Sapho, Brissac filled seats and captured the hearts of San Diego audiences. In 1912, she obtained a divorce from Mockbee on grounds of failure to provide and was awarded custody of their daughter, who remained in the care of Brissac's parents in San Francisco.

At the end of her run at the Grand Theatre, she joined the World's Fair Stock Company in San Diego and toured in the Hawaiian Islands for a year. She opened at Honolulu's Bijou Theatre in Brewster's Millions on December 21, 1912, and closed with a final performance in Honolulu on October 21, 1913 at the Grand Opera House.

When the tour ended, Brissac made two short silent films for Carl Laemmle (The Shark God and Hawaiian Love) with future MGM film director John Griffith Wray, a lead actor and stage director with the World's Fair Stock Company who had a side contract with Laemmle to make the films. Playing a native girl and a tribal chief's daughter, Brissac paddled canoes and danced with Hawaiian natives throughout November and December before finally sailing home to San Francisco on January 28, 1914 aboard the steamship Wilhelmina.

On June 29, 1915, Brissac and Wray were married in Santa Ana, California and then returned to San Diego where they continued to live and work for the next six years. Before opening her own stock company at San Diego's Strand Theatre, with Wray as managing director, Brissac returned to the Bay area on August 5, 1917 to give a "Farewell" performance as The Eternal Magdalene at the Bishop Playhouse in Oakland, then took the 'Brissac World's Fair Stock Company' on a tour in Australia.

=== 1918–1934 ===
In the middle of their record-breaking four-year residency at the Strand Theatre, Wray was hired to direct films for Thomas H. Ince at the newly formed Ince/MGM Studios and began spending more time in Los Angeles than in San Diego. With stock theatre in rapid decline, the Strand Theatre closed in 1921 and Brissac finally left San Diego to join him. Her daughter Ardel came to live with them a short time later. Ardel eventually took John Wray's last name, and as Ardel Wray, later became a Hollywood screenwriter remembered for films such as I Walked With a Zombie, The Leopard Man and Isle of the Dead.

Some time after the release of his silent film adaptation of Eugene O'Neill's Anna Christie in 1923, John Wray began a long affair with screenwriter Josephine McLaughlin (a.k.a. Bradley King), and Brissac divorced him in May 1927.

She did encore performances in San Diego several years later and took roles in one or two theatre productions in the 1950s.

== Career in film and television ==
During the years she lived with John Wray in Culver City, Brissac became friends with the Laemmle family and many of the people working with them and Thomas Ince, among them actress Carole Lombard and entertainer Russ Columbo. After her divorce, Brissac worked as Columbo's private secretary and assistant for a time.

While chatting with industry photographer Lansing Brown one night in Brown's studio, Colombo asked about an antique dueling pistol that Brown owned. Brown picked up the pistol to show it to Columbo and was fiddling with it when it accidentally discharged, sending a bullet ricocheting off a coffee table and into Columbo, who died a few hours later. Brissac had to identify Colombo for the Los Angeles County Coroner's Office and testify about the accident at the inquest.

A few months later, Arthur Lubin, a former member of the San Diego Stock company, gave Brissac her break into acting in Hollywood. Lubin had joined Brissac's company sometime after he graduated high school in San Diego, and he was one of the people who took over managing it when Wray went to work for Ince. When the Strand Theatre closed its doors in 1921, Lubin had followed Wray and Brissac to Hollywood. Learning of Brissac's situation after Colombo's death, he cast her as Mrs. Van Twerp in his 1935 comedy Honeymoon Limited, and by 1937, she had become an established character actress in Hollywood.

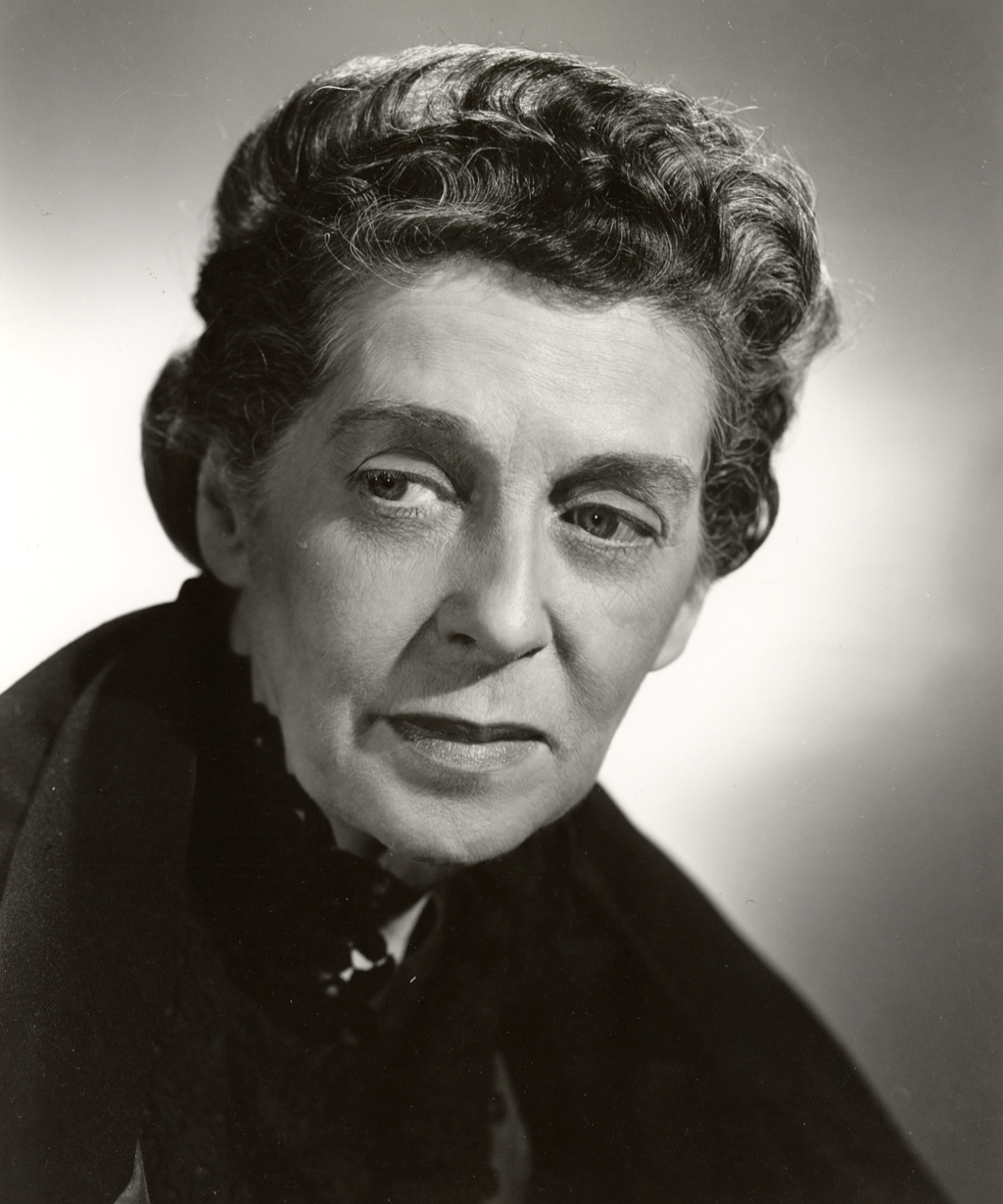
Virginia Brissac in Captain From Castile (1947)

Over the next 18 years, Brissac was cast in more than 155 films and appeared in episodes of the television series Dragnet, The Pepsi-Cola Playhouse, I Love Lucy, Crown Theatre with Gloria Swanson, Mayor of the Town (1954 series based on the 1940s radio show) and The Lone Wolf.

== Retirement and death ==
Brissac was 72 when she got the part of Jim Stark's grandmother in Rebel Without a Cause in 1955. Beginning to have trouble remembering her lines, she did one or two commercials after that and then retired. The money she made as a film actress had been invested for her by her only brother, Belnore Brissac Jr., and those investments, along with social security and small Equity and motion picture industry pension checks allowed her to live the rest of her life in modest comfort. She lived another 25 years and died on July 26, 1979, aged 96, in Santa Fe, New Mexico. Her daughter, Ardel Wray, died four years later at age 75 of breast cancer.

Brissac's ashes are interred with those of her parents and other Brissac family members in the columbarium at Mt. Olivet Memorial Park in Colma, California, south of San Francisco.

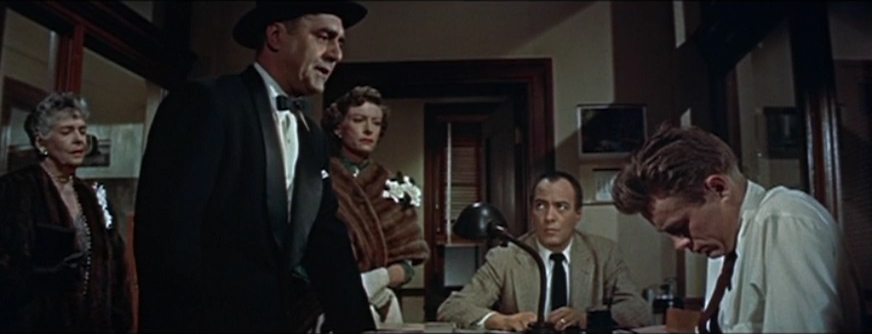
Virginia Brissac, Jim Backus, Ann Doran, Edward Platt and James Dean in Rebel Without a Cause

== Legacy ==
Although not unique, Brissac's career was unusual for its length (over 50 years) and its geographical and historical arc. She was a contemporary of Theda Bara, Isadora Duncan, and Eleanor Roosevelt, and in a 1919 publicity stunt, she became the first air parcel post package in the United States, flown from San Diego to Los Angeles in a two-seater single engine plane wearing a helmet covered with postage stamps.

Brissac's career was memorialized in a biographical article titled "The Coast Defender: Virginia Brissac, San Diego's Sweetheart" published in The San Diego Magazine in 1971. The article is based on extensive correspondence and interviews with Brissac and various people she worked with in San Diego. The article also includes reminiscences of her early career and provides insights into the history and workings of West Coast Stock companies in the early 1900s. Brissac's professional scrapbooks were donated to the San Diego History Center in 2016.

== Complete filmography ==
- The Shark God (1913 short)
- Hawaiian Love (1913 short) as Labela
- Honeymoon Limited (1935) as Mrs. Van Twerp
- Three Godfathers (1936) as Mrs. McLane
- Counterfeit (1936) as Tour Guide (uncredited)
- Murder by an Aristocrat (1936) as Adela Thatcher
- We Went to College (1936) as Wife at Faculty Club (uncredited)
- The Big Noise (1936) as Mrs. Trent
- The Song of a Nation (1936 short) as Mrs. Callan
- Two Against the World (1936) as Marion Sims
- The Texas Rangers (1936) as David's Mother (uncredited)
- Down the Stretch (1936) as Aunt Julia
- Love Letters of a Star (1936) as Mrs. Blodgett
- Stolen Holiday (1937) as Wedding Guest (uncredited)
- Mountain Justice (1937) as Mrs. Hughes (uncredited)
- Artists and Models (1937) as Seamstress (uncredited)
- White Bondage (1937) as Sarah Talcott
- Give Till It Hurts (1937 short) as First Nurse (uncredited)
- Idol of the Crowds (1937) as Mrs. Dale
- The Adventurous Blonde (1937) as Mrs. Jenny Hammond
- The Man in the Barn (1937 short) as Farmer's Wife (uncredited)
- The Bad Man of Brimstone (1937) as Mrs. Grant (uncredited)
- Delinquent Parents (1938) as Mrs. Herbert Ellis
- The Magician's Daughter (1938 short) as Mrs. Murdock (uncredited)
- Gateway (1938) as Friend of Mrs. McNutt (uncredited)
- Young Dr. Kildare (1938) as Boardinghouse Landlady (uncredited)
- Up the River (1938) as Ship Passenger (uncredited)
- Secrets of a Nurse (1938) as Farlinger
- Jesse James (1939) as Boy's Mother
- Wings of the Navy (1939) as Nurse (uncredited)
- Woman Doctor (1939) as Miss Crenshaw
- Dark Victory (1939) as Martha
- Young Mr. Lincoln (1939) as Peach Pie Baker (uncredited)
- Invitation to Happiness (1939) as Eleanor's Nurse (uncredited)
- The Forgotten Woman (1939) as Mrs. Kimball
- They Shall Have Music (1939) as Willie's Mother (uncredited)
- I Stole a Million (1939) as Nurse (uncredited)
- Stop, Look and Love (1939) as Dressmaker (uncredited)
- Think First (1939 short) as Store Detective (uncredited)
- Parents on Trial (1939) as Mrs. Martin
- First Love (1939) as Commencement Speaker (uncredited)
- Destry Rides Again (1939) as Sophie Claggett
- A Child Is Born (1939) as Mr. Norton's Mother (uncredited)
- The Cisco Kid and the Lady (1939) as Seamstress (uncredited)
- Remember the Night (1940) as Mrs. Emory
- Little Old New York (1940) as Mrs. Brevoort
- Black Friday (1940) as Mrs. Margaret Kingsley
- The House Across the Bay (1940) as Landlady
- Little Orvie (1940) as Mrs. Green
- It's a Date (1940) as Miss Holden
- If I Had My Way (1940) as Mrs. Blair (uncredited)
- Alias the Deacon (1940) as Elsie Clark
- The Ghost Breakers (1940) as Mother Zombie
- Cinderella's Feller (1940 short) as Wicked Stepmother
- Wagons Westward (1940) as Angela Cook
- All This, and Heaven Too (1940) as Nun (uncredited)
- Hired Wife (1940) as Miss Collins (uncredited)
- Strike Up the Band (1940) as Mrs. May Holden
- Always a Bride (1940) as Lucy Bond
- Lady with Red Hair (1940) as Miss Humbert (uncredited)
- Chad Hanna (1940) as Landlady
- The Great Lie (1941) as Sadie
- Washington Melodrama (1941) as Mrs. Curzon
- The Nurse's Secret (1941) as Mary
- Badmen of Missouri (1941) as Mrs. Hathaway
- Dressed to Kill (1941) as Lynne Evans, alias Emily the Maid
- The Little Foxes (1941) as Mrs. Hewitt
- Unfinished Business (1941) as Aunt (uncredited)
- One Foot in Heaven (1941) as Mrs. Jellison (uncredited)
- Appointment for Love (1941) as Nora
- They Died with Their Boots On (1941) as Woman (uncredited)
- Remember the Day (1941) as Mrs. Hill (uncredited)
- Lady Gangster (1942) as Mrs. Stoner
- Take a Letter, Darling (1942) as Mrs. Dowling (uncredited)
- Tough as They Come (1942) as Mrs. Clark
- The Big Shot (1942) as Mrs. Booth
- Get Hep to Love (1942) as Mrs. Brown
- The Mummy's Tomb (1942) as Mrs. Ella Evans
- Lucky Jordan (1942) as Clarence's Wife
- Star Spangled Rhythm (1942) as Lady from Iowa - 'Old Glory' Number (uncredited)
- Mug Town (1942) as Mrs. Bell
- Shadow of a Doubt (1943) as Mrs. Phillips (uncredited)
- The Hard Way (1943) as The Dress Saleswoman (uncredited)
- Someone to Remember (1943) as Mrs. Parson (uncredited)
- The Iron Major (1943) as Mrs. Ayres (uncredited)
- My Kingdom for a Cook (1943) as Mrs. Harris (uncredited)
- Crime Doctor's Strangest Case (1943) as Patricia Cornwall
- Moonlight in Vermont (1943) as Aunt Bess
- Phantom Lady (1944) as Dr. Chase
- This Is the Life (1944) as Mrs. Tiggett
- Song of the Open Road (1944) as Camp Matron (uncredited)
- Sing, Neighbor, Sing (1944) as Cornelia Blake
- Marriage Is a Private Affair (1944) as Mrs. Courtland West
- Bowery to Broadway (1944) as Sophia (uncredited)
- Faces in the Fog (1944) as Miss Harvey, Juror (uncredited)
- Together Again (1944) as Townswoman (uncredited)
- Night Club Girl (1945) as Ma Kendall
- A Tree Grows in Brooklyn (1945) as Miss Tilford (uncredited)
- G. I. Honeymoon (1945) as Lavinia Thorndyke
- The Scarlet Clue (1945) as Mrs. Marsh
- Thrill of a Romance (1945) as Ms. McKenzie (uncredited)
- Three's a Crowd (1945) as Cary Whipple
- That's the Spirit (1945) as Miss Preble (uncredited)
- Captain Eddie (1945) as Flo Clark
- Bewitched (1945) as Martha - the Governor's Wife
- State Fair (1945) as Farmer's Wife (uncredited)
- That Night with You (1945) as Mrs. Hawthorne (uncredited)
- The Dolly Sisters (1945) as Nun (uncredited)
- Why Girls Leave Home (1945) as Mrs. Leslie
- The Daltons Ride Again (1945) as Mrs. Kate Bohannan Walters (uncredited)
- Renegades (1946) as Sarah Dembrow (uncredited)
- Hot Cargo (1946) as Mrs. Chapman
- The Mysterious Mr. M (1946) as Cornelia Waldron
- The Mysterious Mr. Valentine (1946) as Martha
- Sister Kenny (1946) as Mrs. Johnson (uncredited)
- Pursued (1947) as Woman at the wedding (uncredited)
- Monsieur Verdoux (1947) as Carlotta Couvais
- Secret Beyond the Door (1947) as Sarah (uncredited)
- Captain from Castile (1947) as Doña Maria De Vargas (uncredited)
- Three Daring Daughters (1948) as Miss Drake (uncredited)
- Summer Holiday (1948) as Miss Hawley
- The Mating of Millie (1948) as Mrs. Thomas
- Old Los Angeles (1948) as Señora Del Rey
- The Untamed Breed (1948) as Mrs. Jones (uncredited)
- The Snake Pit (1948) as Miss Seiffert
- An Act of Murder (1948) as Mrs. Russell
- The Last Bandit (1949) as Kate's Mother
- Mother Is a Freshman (1949) as Miss Grimes (uncredited)
- The Doolins of Oklahoma (1949) as Mrs. Burton
- Tension (1949) as Mrs. Andrews (uncredited)
- No Man of Her Own (1950) as Justice of the Peace's Wife (uncredited)
- Cheaper by the Dozen (1950) as Mrs. Benson (uncredited)
- Edge of Doom (1950) as Mrs. Dennis, the Rectory Housekeeper
- Harriet Craig (1950) as Mother of Harriet Craig (uncredited)
- Operation Pacific (1951) as Sister Anna
- Three Guys Named Mike (1951) as Mrs. Lewis (uncredited)
- Two of a Kind (1951) as Maida McIntyre
- Flame of Araby (1951) as Alhena (uncredited)
- Bugles in the Afternoon (1952) as Mrs. Carson (uncredited)
- Woman of the North Country (1952) as Mrs. Dawson
- Meet Me at the Fair (1953) as Mrs. Spooner
- Fair Wind to Java (1953) as Bintang
- The Bandits of Corsica (1953) as Maria
- All I Desire (1953) as Mrs. Tomlin (uncredited)
- Executive Suite (1954) as Edith Alderson
- Ma and Pa Kettle at Home (1954) as Martha Maddocks
- Phantom of the Rue Morgue (1954) as Well-Dressed Woman in Coach (uncredited)
- About Mrs. Leslie (1954) as Mrs. Poole
- Rebel Without a Cause (1955) as Mrs. Stark, Jim's Grandmother
