= Val Lewton: The Man in the Shadows =

- Written by: Kent Jones
- Directed by: Kent Jones
- Narrated by: Martin Scorsese
- Country of origin: United States
- Original language: English/French/Japanese

Production
- Running time: 77 minutes

Original release
- Release: 2007

Val Lewton: The Man in the Shadows (also known as Martin Scorsese Presents: Val Lewton – The Man in the Shadows) is a documentary tribute to Val Lewton, the producer of a series of distinctive low-budget horror films for RKO Radio Pictures, presented and narrated by director Martin Scorsese.

== Films discussed ==
=== RKO films ===
- Cat People (1942)
- I Walked with a Zombie (1943)
- The Leopard Man (1943)
- The Seventh Victim (1943)
- The Ghost Ship (1943)
- The Curse of the Cat People (1944)
- Mademoiselle Fifi (1944)
- Youth Runs Wild (1944)
- The Body Snatcher (1945)
- Isle of the Dead (1945)
- Bedlam (1946)
