= Appointment with Danger =

1951 film by Lewis Allen

- Theatrical release poster
- Directed by: Lewis Allen
- Screenplay by: Richard L. Breen; Warren Duff
- Produced by: Robert Fellows
- Starring: Alan Ladd; Phyllis Calvert
- Cinematography: John F. Seitz
- Edited by: LeRoy Stone
- Music by: Victor Young
- Production company: Paramount Pictures
- Distributed by: Paramount Pictures
- Release dates: April 7, 1950 (United Kingdom); May 9, 1951 (New York)
- Running time: 90 minutes
- Country: United States
- Language: English
- Box office: $1,450,000 (US rentals)

Appointment with Danger is a 1950 Paramount Pictures American crime film noir directed by Lewis Allen, written by Richard L. Breen and Warren Duff and starring Alan Ladd, Phyllis Calvert, Paul Stewart, Jan Sterling and Jack Webb.

Filming began on the U.S. production in June 1949, the picture was released in Great Britain in April 1950, but did not debut in the USA until May 1951.

== Plot ==
In Gary, Indiana, U.S. postal inspector Harry Gruber is murdered by two men, Joe Regas and George Soderquist. They dump the body in La Porte during a rainstorm, but when a nun named Sister Augustine walks past, Soderquist tries to distract her by helping to unfurl her umbrella and tells her that Gruber is drunk. Sister Augustine reports the incident to a nearby policeman.

Postal inspector Al Goddard is assigned to the case. He traces Sister Augustine to a convent in Fort Wayne and convinces her to cooperate with the investigation, and she identifies Soderquist from a mug book. Goddard arranges for her to stay at a convent in Gary, hoping that she might identify Soderquist there in person.

Goddard spots Soderquist with another gang member, Paul Ferrar, but Soderquist escapes. Regas, whom Sister Augustine does not recognize, sees her and telephones Earl Boettiger, the head of the gang and owner of the hotel where Gruber was killed, warning him to hide Soderquist. Later, when Soderquist refuses an order to leave town, they kill him.

Goddard reasons that because Soderquist has not left town, the gang must still be planning something. The Gary postmaster suggests a likely target for theft: a money shipment that arrives regularly by train but must change to another train, involving a seven-minute truck ride between stations. Gruber had asked him about the truck's drivers, one of whom is Farrar, whom Goddard recognizes.

Goddard, posing as a corrupt inspector, pressures Ferrar to allow him to meet the head of the gang. He asks Earl Boettiger to join the gang, promising to be a more reliable inside man than is Ferrar. The plan is to steal the money shipment, expected to be worth $1 million. Regas is still worried about Sister Augustine and unsuccessfully tries to stage a fatal accident on the convent grounds.

When Boettiger makes a last-minute change to the plan, Goddard has no choice but to phone the police from the gang's hotel. He is heard by Boettiger's mistress, hotel employee Dodie, but she protects him because she does not want to become an accessory to his murder and leaves town.

When the robbery begins, Regas neglects his part in the preparations to take Sister Augustine prisoner, and when the gang meets, she blurts Goddard's name, revealing his deception. He pleads for her life and buys time by starting a fight. As police arrive, a shootout ensues in an industrial district, ending in the death of all the gang members.

== Cast ==
- Alan Ladd as Al Goddard
- Phyllis Calvert as Sister Augustine
- Paul Stewart as Earl Boettiger
- Jan Sterling as Dodie
- Jack Webb as Joe Regas
- Stacy Harris as Paul Ferrar
- Harry Morgan as George Soderquist (credited as Henry Morgan)
- David Bauer as David Goodman (as David Wolfe)
- Dan Riss as Maury Ahearn
- Geraldine Wall as Mother Ambrose
- George J. Lewis as Leo Cronin
- Paul Lees as Gene Gunner

== Background ==
The film was announced in July 1948 under the title of Postal Inspector and envisioned as a vehicle for Alan Ladd. Ardel Wray and Robert L. Richards wrote the script, and the film was intended to follow Chicago Deadline (1949). The production was delayed to allow Ladd to appear in Captain Carey, U.S.A. The film's title was changed to Dead Letter. William Keighley was originally announced as the film's director, but he was replaced by Lewis Allen.

Phyllis Calvert was signed in April 1949. According to her, the studio did not believe that she would accept the part, as she had declined several previous film offers.

After six weeks of script rewrites, filming began on June 16, 1949. The title was changed again to United States Mail.

The film features Jack Webb and Harry Morgan as villains, later paired as Los Angeles police detectives on the Dragnet television show. The film's cowriter Richard L. Breen had previously worked with Webb on the radio series Pat Novak for Hire, and would write at least three scripts for Dragnet, including the 1954 theatrical film and the 1966 TV-movie pilot for the revival series.

== Reception ==
The film was released in the U.K. in April 1950 and debuted in the U.S. in May 1951, retitled as Appointment with Danger.

In a contemporary review for The New York Times, critic A. H. Weiler wrote: "'Appointment With Danger' lives up to its title as Ladd, checking on the murder of another postal inspector in Gary, Ind., finds a visiting nun who saw the criminals. Since the scenarists had no intention of fashioning a whodunit, they have succeeded in making their story a tense, hard-boiled exposé of a crime in the making as Ladd, using his witness, insinuates himself into the gang which has already killed and which is planning the robbery. ... 'Appointment With Danger' not only proves that crime does not pay but that it can be interesting to observe."

== Awards ==
The film was nominated for the Edgar Award for best mystery film of the year by the Mystery Writers of America, but lost to Five Fingers.
