= Youth Runs Wild =

1944 film by Mark Robson

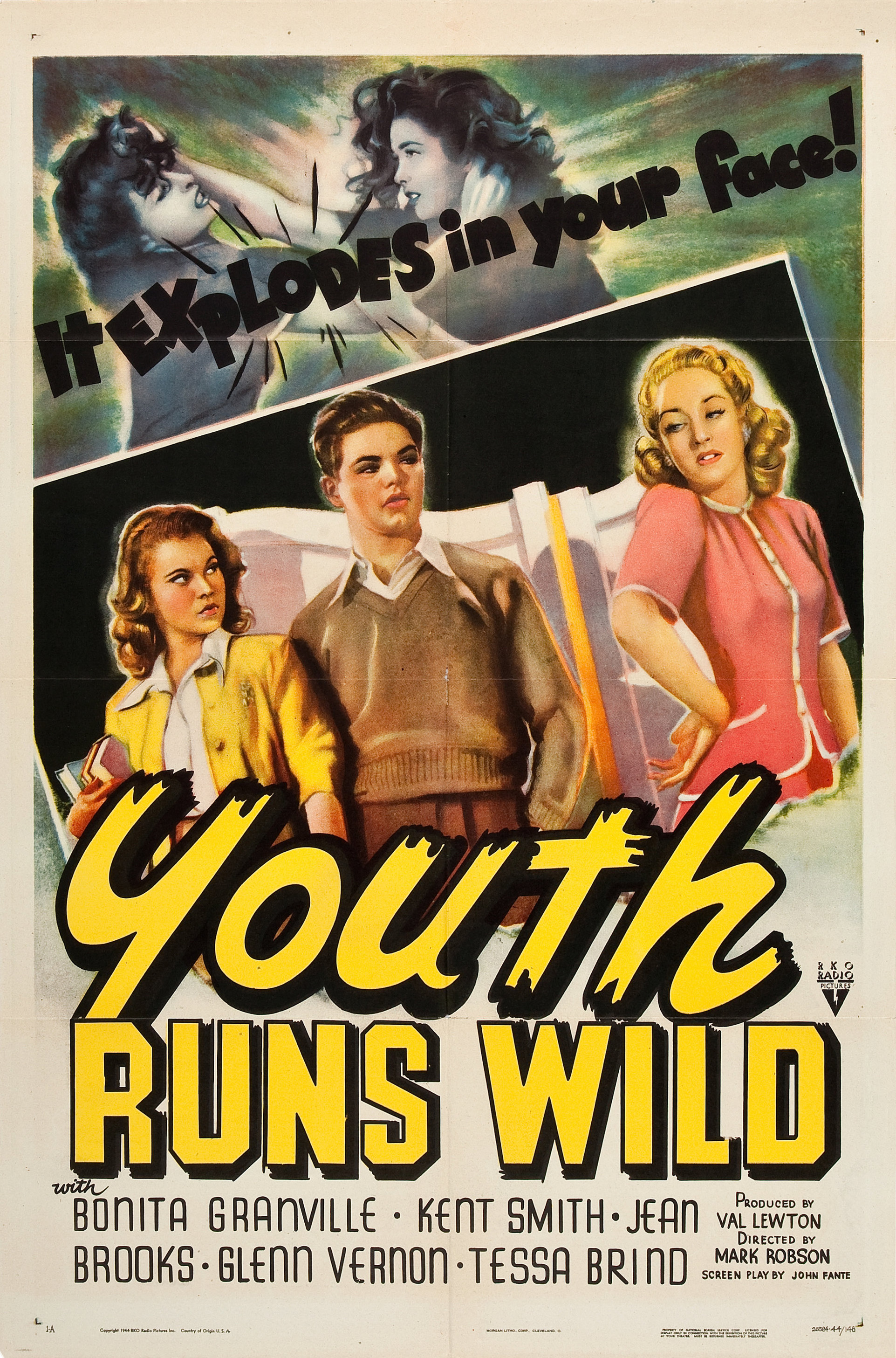
- Theatrical release poster by William Rose
- Directed by: Mark Robson
- Written by: John Fante; Herbert Kline(story); Ardel Wray (add'l dialogue)
- Produced by: Val Lewton
- Starring: Bonita Granville; Kent Smith; Jean Brooks; Glen Vernon; Vanessa Brown
- Cinematography: John J. Mescall
- Edited by: John Lockert
- Music by: Paul Sawtell
- Distributed by: RKO Radio Pictures
- Release date: September 1, 1944 (New York City)
- Running time: 67 minutes
- Country: United States
- Language: English

Youth Runs Wild is a 1944 drama film directed by Mark Robson and starring Bonita Granville, Kent Smith, Jean Brooks, Glen Vernon and Vanessa Brown. The plot concerns inattentive parents and juvenile delinquency. The film was produced by Val Lewton. It was written by John Fante, Herbert Kline and Ardel Wray. Although Val Lewton produced the film, the final released version was so different from the original cut that he asked for his name to be removed from the picture; a request denied him by RKO.

== Plot ==
Frankie and Sarah are teenage neighbours who are dating.

Frankie tries to steal some tyres with his friends to make some money to impress Sarah. An older gangster is shot during the robbery.

Frankie is told not to see Sarah any more by his mother, as they blame her for his bad behaviour.

Toddy, the older gangster's girlfriend, tells Sarah she needs to see the gangster in hospital for her since she can't go in because she has a criminal record.

Afterwards they go to the theme park. When they miss the last bus, they stay the night.

On arriving home, Sarah's parents are abusive. Toddy takes her away and says Sarah can live with her and work at the Park, a bar which is generally described to attract bad people. Toddy promises to look after Sarah. Sarah agrees.

Frankie goes to the bar to tell Sarah he should have never have listened to his mother and that he loves her. She considers herself grown up, so rejects him and gets him thrown out for being underaged.

Frankie's two friends decide to try and go back in. This starts a fight and Toddy is hit. She breaks her neck, and dies in hospital.

The three boys are given 18 months incarceration. Sarah promises she will wait for Frankie.

== Cast ==
- Bonita Granville as Toddy
- Kent Smith as Danny Coates
- Jean Brooks as Mary Hauser Coates
- Glen Vernon as Frank Hauser
- Vanessa Brown as Sarah Taylor
- Ben Bard as Mr. Taylor
- Mary Servoss as Mrs. Cora Hauser
- Arthur Shields as Mr. Dunlop
- Lawrence Tierney as Larry Duncan
- Dickie Moore as Georgie Dunlop
- Johnny Walsh as Herb Vigero
- Rod Rodgers as Rocky
- Elizabeth Russell as Mrs. Mabel Taylor
- Stanley Blystone as Policeman (uncredited)
- Art Smith as Fred Hauser (uncredited)

== Production ==
Edward Dmytryk, who had recently directed the sensationalistic films Hitler's Children and Behind the Rising Sun (both in 1943), was initially set to direct Youth Runs Wild – which at various time had the working titles "The Dangerous Age", "Look to Your Children" and "Are These Our Children?" – but he left to direct Tender Comrade. The film went into production under director Mark Robson, a regular in the Val Lewton unit, from November 3 to December 21, 1943. For the shoot, the cinematographer, John J. Mescall, experimented with a new "swivel lens" that would allow a nearly infinite depth of focus.

The film was inspired by a photo essay that appeared in Look magazine on September 21, 1943. Look, however, did not like the completed film, describing it as an "outworn, stale documentary", and they refused to promote the film in the magazine, or even to allow their name to be used in the film's credits. Some copies of the film do carry on the main title card (see the image in the infobox at the head of this article) the legend:

Inspired by the LOOK Magazine Picture Story
"ARE THESE OUR CHILDREN?"

The film's technical advisor, Ruth Clifton, was a teenager whose example of starting a youth recreation center in Moline, Illinois, inspired others around the country to do the same thing. RKO attempted to position the film as authentic by showing it to various state and local authorities concerned with juvenile delinquency, but they also did not receive the film well, even though one of the writers, Herbert Kline was a noted director of documentaries about social issues. The studio's efforts did bring the film to the attention of the U.S. State Department, which expressed concern that focusing on juvenile delinquency at that moment might have a detrimental effect on national morale.

Lewton argued that the intent of the film was to draw attention to a national problem and help bring about measures to solve it, which would do the country more good than harm. ... RKO decided not to pull the film from active production, but because of its controversial subject matter, Lewton was given more supervision than usual, much to his displeasure.

== Post Production ==
RKO tested two versions of the film, Lewton's and another in which several scenes had been cut, including one where an abused teenager killed his sadistic father. The final released version was the studio's cut. As a result, some of the actors listed in the credits do not actually appear in the film. Lewton later disavowed the final version of the film and attempted to have his name removed from it.

== Release ==
Youth Runs Wild premiered in New York City on September 1, 1944 and went into general release in January 1945.

It was not well received and lost $45,000.
