= Mark Robson (film director) =

Canadian-American film director, producer, and editor (1913–1978)

- Born: 4 December 1913; Montreal, Quebec, Canada
- Died: 20 June 1978 (aged 64); London, England
- Resting place: Mount Sinai Memorial Park Cemetery, Los Angeles, California, U.S.
- Education: UC Los Angeles; Pacific Coast University
- Occupations: Film director, producer, editor
- Years active: 1941–1978
- Spouse: Sarah Naomi Riskind (m. 1936) (1915–1982)
- Children: 3

Mark Robson (4 December 1913 – 20 June 1978) was a Canadian-American film director, producer, and editor. Robson began his 45-year career in Hollywood as a film editor. He later began working as a director and producer. He directed 34 films during his career, including Champion (1949), Bright Victory (1951), The Bridges at Toko-Ri (1954), Peyton Place (1957), The Inn of the Sixth Happiness (1958), Von Ryan's Express (1965), Valley of the Dolls (1967), and Earthquake (1974).

Robson was twice nominated for the Academy Award for Best Director – for Peyton Place and The Inn of the Sixth Happiness – as well as four nominations for the Directors Guild of America Award for Outstanding Directing in Feature Films. Two of his films were nominated for the Cannes Film Festival's Palme d'Or. In 1960, he received a star on the Hollywood Walk of Fame for his contributions to the motion picture industry.

== Early life and education ==
Mark Robson was born in Montreal, Canada on 4 December 1913. He grew up in Montreal, where he attended grade school at Roslyn Elementary School, and then secondary school at Westmount High School. After finishing high school, Robson attended college at the University of California, Los Angeles, and then went on to study at the Pacific Coast University School of Law. Upon finishing his studies, he found work in the prop department at 20th Century Fox studios. Robson entually went to work at RKO Pictures, where he began training as a film editor.

== Career ==
=== Editor ===
In 1940, Mark Robson worked as an assistant to Robert Wise on the editing of Citizen Kane, the film debut of Orson Welles. Mark Robson and Robert Wise also worked together editing Welles' next movie, The Magnificent Ambersons (1942); when doing so, they made drastic cuts to the ending of the film, which Welles disagreed with.

Robson was promoted to editor for The Falcon's Brother (1942), an RKO B picture. He then edited Journey into Fear (1943), made by Orson Welles' company. The editing was again done without Welles' involvement.

=== Work with Val Lewton ===
Both Robson and Wise benefited from producer and screenwriter Val Lewton, who was supervising a series of horror low budget films at RKO that have since become legendary. The first of these films they worked on together was Cat People (1942), directed by Jacques Tourneur. Robson also edited Lewton's next two films, both directed by Tourneur, I Walked with a Zombie (1943) and The Leopard Man (1943).

=== Director ===
Lewton was so impressed with Robson's work that he promoted him to director for The Seventh Victim (1943). Lewton liked the result, so Robson directed The Ghost Ship (1943). Lewton also gave Robert Wise his first directing job, on The Curse of the Cat People (1944).

Lewton wanted to make non-horror films, and so RKO allowed him to make Youth Runs Wild (1944), a juvenile delinquency story; Robson directed, but the film was not a commercial success. More popular was Isle of the Dead (1945), starring Boris Karloff. Lewton, Karloff and Robson reunited to work on Bedlam (1946), which lost money at the box office (and turned out to be the last horror movie produced by Lewton).

=== Leaving RKO ===
Robson's success at RKO led to work on major film projects, and in 1949 he was nominated for the Directors Guild of America Award for Outstanding Directorial Achievement in Motion Pictures for his work on the film noir Champion (1949), produced by Stanley Kramer.

The same year, Mark Robson directed another film for Stanley Kramer, Home of the Brave (1949), a screen adaptation penned by Arthur Laurents of his 1945 play Home of the Brave. Home of the Brave was one of the first Hollywood films to deal with the issue of racism.

Next Robson directed Roughshod (1949), a Western, for RKO, and My Foolish Heart (1949), a melodrama for producer Sam Goldwyn. Goldwyn then used Robson for Edge of Doom (1950) and I Want You (1951). Robson later called his Goldwyn period "one of the worst periods of my career".

At Universal, Mark Robson made Bright Victory (1951). Robson briefly brought Val Lewton and Robert Wise into a partnership for film and television production, only to drop the ailing Lewton without explanation a few months later. Robson and Wise produced Return to Paradise (1953), starring Gary Cooper. For Warwick Films, Robson directed Alan Ladd in Hell Below Zero (1954). He made a comedy at Columbia, Phffft (1954), written by George Axelrod who described the director as:

A sweet, dear, darling man... who hadn't a clue how to do comedy. Not a clue.... Mark crushed the scenes up all the time... Mark was an editor. He didn't understand his own limitations. Good directors come in various ways, but editors are the worst because they are interested in editing. They don't know about story. They don't know about comedy. Or even acting. They only know about having a "match."

Robson had one of the biggest hits in his career with The Bridges at Toko-Ri (1954). This film won him another DGA nomination. Warwick Films used him again for A Prize of Gold (1955). He went to MGM to make Trial (1955). His boxing film, The Harder They Fall (1956), was based on a novel by Budd Schulberg.

The Little Hut (1957), a comedy for MGM, was a huge hit. Even bigger was Peyton Place (1957), for 20th Century Fox. Robson was nominated for an Academy Award for Best Director. He was nominated again the following year for directing Ingrid Bergman in The Inn of the Sixth Happiness. For these films, he also received his third and fourth Directors Guild of America nominations.

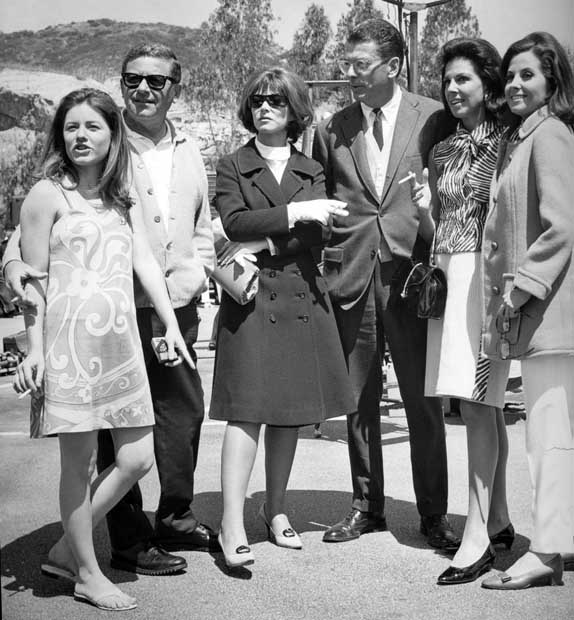
On set of Valley of the Dolls (1967), L–R: Patty Duke, Mark Robson, Lee Grant, David Weisbart (producer), Jacqueline Susann (author of book), and Barbara Parkins

=== Producer ===
Robson produced and directed From the Terrace (1960) starring Paul Newman. He produced The Inspector (1962) and Nine Hours to Rama (1963), the latter of which he also directed. After completing that film, Robson left Fox after a five-year association.

Robson and Newman reunited on The Prize (1963) for MGM. It was a hit, as was Von Ryan's Express (1965), starring Frank Sinatra, back at Fox.

Robson produced and directed Lost Command (1966), a tale of the French Foreign Legion, and directed 1967's Valley of the Dolls, a film panned by the critics, but a success at the box office.

=== Later films ===
Robson made a series of films that were commercially disappointing: Daddy's Gone A-Hunting (1969), Happy Birthday, Wanda June (1971), and Limbo (1972). In 1974, he directed Earthquake, the film that introduced "Sensurround".

== Personal life ==
Robson was married to Sarah Naomi Riskind from 1936 until his death on 20 June 1978, from a heart attack in London after completing Avalanche Express. The film was released a year after his death. The couple had three children.

Robson is interred in Mount Sinai Memorial Park Cemetery in Los Angeles.

For his contribution to the motion picture industry, he has a star on the Hollywood Walk of Fame at 1722 Vine Street.

== Filmography ==
=== Editor ===
- Citizen Kane (1941, assistant editor, uncredited)
- The Magnificent Ambersons (1942, assistant editor, uncredited)
- Mail Trouble (1942)
- The Falcon's Brother (1942)
- Cat People (1942)
- Journey into Fear (1943)
- I Walked with a Zombie (1943)
- The Leopard Man (1943)

=== Director ===
- The Seventh Victim (1943)
- The Ghost Ship (1943)
- Youth Runs Wild (1944)
- Isle of the Dead (1945)
- Bedlam (1946, also screenwriter)
- Champion (1949)
- Roughshod (1949)
- Home of the Brave (1949)
- My Foolish Heart (1949)
- Edge of Doom (1950)
- Bright Victory (1951)
- I Want You (1951)
- Return to Paradise (1953, also producer)
- Hell Below Zero (1954)
- Phffft (1954)
- The Bridges at Toko-Ri (1955)
- A Prize of Gold (1955)
- Trial (1955)
- The Harder They Fall (1956)
- The Little Hut (1957, also producer)
- Peyton Place (1957)
- The Inn of the Sixth Happiness (1958)
- From the Terrace (1960, also producer)
- The Inspector (1962, producer only)
- Nine Hours to Rama (1963, also producer)
- The Prize (1963)
- Von Ryan's Express (1965)
- Lost Command (1966, also producer)
- Valley of the Dolls (1967, also producer)
- Daddy's Gone A-Hunting (1969, also producer)
- Happy Birthday, Wanda June (1971, also producer)
- Limbo (1972)
- Earthquake (1974, also producer)
- Avalanche Express (1979, also producer)
