= Val Lewton =

Russian-American writer and film producer (1904–1951)

- Born: Vladimir Ivanovich Leventon; May 7, 1904; Yalta, Taurida Governorate, Russian Empire
- Died: March 14, 1951 (aged 46); Los Angeles, California, U.S.
- Occupations: Novelist; film producer; screenwriter
- Years active: 1932–1951
- Spouse: Ruth Knapp
- Children: 2, including Val

Val Lewton (May 7, 1904 – March 14, 1951) was a Russian-American novelist, film producer, and screenwriter best known for a string of low-budget horror films he produced for RKO Pictures in the 1940s. His son, also named Val Lewton, was a painter and exhibition designer.

Lewton was born in Yalta, Imperial Russia, and immigrated to the United States with his family in 1909. He began his career as a writer, producing novels, including the best-selling pulp novel No Bed of Her Own. Lewton worked as a writer and publicist for MGM before being named head of RKO's horror unit in 1942. His first production, Cat People, became a top moneymaker for RKO that year. Lewton produced several successful films, often writing the final draft of the screenplays himself. He gave first directing opportunities to Robert Wise and Mark Robson and worked with Boris Karloff, who credited Lewton with saving his career. After leaving RKO, Lewton worked for Paramount and MGM, producing various films. His life and work have inspired books, documentaries, and an upcoming feature film.

== Early life ==
Lewton was born Vladimir Ivanovich Hofschneider or Leventon (Russian: Владимир Иванович Левентон; Ukrainian: Володимир Іванович Левентон, both with surname Leventon) in Yalta, Imperial Russia (now in Ukraine), in 1904. He was of Jewish descent, the son of moneylender Max Hofschneider and Anna "Nina" Leventon, a pharmacist's daughter. The family converted to Christianity. He was nephew of actress Alla Nazimova.

His mother left his father and moved to Berlin, taking their two children with her. In 1909, they emigrated to the United States as second cabin class passengers on board the SS Amerika, which sailed from Hamburg, 29 April, and arrived in New York City, 8 May; they were listed as Anna, Olga, and Vladimir Hofschneider. In America, he eventually changed his name to Wladimir Ivan Lewton, which came to be abbreviated as Val Lewton. Upon arrival in New York, Anna Hofschneider and her children joined the household of her famous sister, Alla Nazimova, in Rye, New York; she then reverted a version of her maiden name, Lewton, and earned her living by writing for the films. Her children and she later moved to suburban Port Chester, New York. Val was naturalized as a U.S. citizen in a federal court in Los Angeles as Wladimir Ivan Lewton in June 1941.

In 1920, when Lewton was 16, he lost his job as a society reporter for the Darien-Stamford Review after a story he wrote about a truckload of kosher chickens dying in a New York heat wave was found to be a total fabrication. He went on to study journalism at Columbia University and authored 18 works of nonfiction, fiction, and poetry.

== Career ==
In 1932, he wrote the best-selling pulp novel No Bed of Her Own, which was later used for the film No Man of Her Own, with Clark Gable and Carole Lombard. In 1933, Lewton clandestinely published Grushenka: Three Times a Woman, an erotic novel whose publication would have subjected Lewton to criminal penalties given the mores of the time. Grushenka purported to be a translation from the Russian and brought from the Soviet Union, but this was a ruse to protect the book's real author.

Lewton worked as a writer at MGM's publicity office in New York City, providing novelizations of popular movies for serialization in magazines, which were sometimes later collected into book form. He also wrote promotional copy. He quit this position after the success of No Bed of Her Own, but when three later novels that same year failed to succeed, he journeyed to Hollywood for a job writing a screen treatment of Gogol's Taras Bulba for David O. Selznick. The connection for this job came through Lewton's mother, Nina.

Though a film of Taras Bulba did not follow, Lewton was hired by MGM to work as a publicist and assistant to Selznick. His first screen credit was "revolutionary sequences arranged by" in David O. Selznick's 1935 version of A Tale of Two Cities. Lewton also worked as an uncredited writer for Selznick's Gone with the Wind, including writing the scene where the camera pulls back to reveal hundreds of wounded soldiers at the Atlanta depot. Lewton also worked for Selznick as a story editor, a scout for discovering literary properties for Selznick's studio, and a go-between with the Hollywood censorship system.

On the documentary The Making of Gone With the Wind, Lewton is described by another Selznick employee as warning that Gone With the Wind was unfilmable and that Selznick would be making "the mistake of his life" trying to make a successful movie of it.

In 1942, Lewton was named head of the horror unit at RKO studios at a salary of US$250 per week. He would have to follow three rules: Each film had to come in under a US$150,000 budget, each was to run under 75 minutes, and Lewton's supervisors would supply the film titles prior to the start of production.

Lewton's first production was Cat People, released in 1942. The film was directed by Jacques Tourneur, who subsequently also directed I Walked With a Zombie and The Leopard Man for Lewton. Made for US$134,000, the film went on to earn nearly US$4 million and was the top moneymaker for RKO that year. This success enabled Lewton to make his next films with relatively little studio interference, allowing him to fulfill his vision despite the sensationalistic film titles he was given, focusing on ominous suggestion and themes of existential ambivalence.

Lewton always wrote the final draft of the screenplays for his films, but avoided on-screen co-writing credits except in two cases, The Body Snatcher and Bedlam, for which he used the pseudonym "Carlos Keith", which he had previously used for the novels 4 Wives, A Laughing Woman, This Fool, Passion, and Where the Cobra Sings. After RKO promoted Tourneur to A-films, Lewton gave first directing opportunities to Robert Wise and Mark Robson.

Between 1945 and 1946, Boris Karloff appeared in three films for RKO produced by Lewton: Isle of the Dead, The Body Snatcher, and Bedlam. In a 1946 interview with Louis Berg of the Los Angeles Times, Karloff credited Lewton with saving him from what Karloff saw as the overextended Frankenstein franchise at Universal Pictures. Berg wrote, "Mr. Karloff has great love and respect for Mr. Lewton as the man who rescued him from the living dead and restored, so to speak, his soul."

When RKO head and Lewton supporter Charles Koerner died in 1946, the studio went through personnel and management upheavals, ultimately leaving Lewton unemployed and in ill health after suffering a minor heart attack. Through connections, he rewrote an unused screenplay based upon the life of Lucrezia Borgia. Actress Paulette Goddard at Paramount Studios particularly liked Lewton's treatment, and in exchange for the script, Lewton was given employment through July 1948. (The Goddard film Bride of Vengeance, heavily rewritten, was released in 1949.) While at Paramount, Lewton also produced the film My Own True Love, released in 1949.

Following his association with Paramount, Lewton worked again for MGM, where he produced the Deborah Kerr film Please Believe Me, released in 1950. During this time, Lewton attempted to start an independent production company with former protégés Wise and Robson, but when a disagreement over which property to produce first arose, Lewton was kicked out. Lewton spent time at home working on a screenplay about the famous American Revolutionary War battles at Fort Ticonderoga. Universal Studios made an offer on the work, and though the screenplay was not used, Lewton was given producer duties on the film Apache Drums, released in 1951. This film is usually considered the film most like Lewton's earlier RKO horror films.

== Death and legacy ==
Hollywood producer Stanley Kramer tendered an offer to Lewton to work as an assistant producing a series of films at Columbia Studios. Lewton resigned at Universal and began preparation to work on the film My Six Convicts, but after suffering gallstone problems, he had the first of two heart attacks, which weakened him so much that he died in 1951 at what is now Cedars-Sinai Medical Center at the age of 46. The following year, Kirk Douglas appeared in The Bad and the Beautiful; his character was partly based on Lewton.

A number of books and two documentaries on Lewton have been produced. A documentary film, Martin Scorsese Presents: Val Lewton – The Man in the Shadows, was released in 2007.

In May 2017, The Secret History Of Hollywood, a podcast biopic series by Adam Roche, began an 11-part season on his life and work – "Shadows" – featuring Mark Gatiss. In June 2021, it was announced that "Shadows" was to be turned into a feature film, co-written by Roche and Laeta Kalogridis, with Kalogridis also acting as producer alongside Bradley Fischer.

He became known for the Lewton bus device from Cat People, as similar practices were employed in his subsequent film productions – later becoming known as the jump scare.

== Filmography ==
=== As producer ===
==== RKO ====
- Cat People (1942)
- I Walked with a Zombie (1943)
- The Leopard Man (1943)
- The Seventh Victim (1943)
- The Ghost Ship (1943)
- The Curse of the Cat People (1944)
- Mademoiselle Fifi (1944)
- Youth Runs Wild (1944)
- The Body Snatcher (1945)
- Isle of the Dead (1945)
- Bedlam (1946)

==== Other ====
- My Own True Love (1949)
- Please Believe Me (1950)
- Apache Drums (1951)

=== As writer ===
- No Man of Her Own (1932, novel No Bed of Her Own)
- The Body Snatcher (1945, as Carlos Keith)
- Isle of the Dead (1945) (uncredited)
- Bedlam (1946, as Carlos Keith)

=== Other ===
- A Tale of Two Cities (1935, uncredited second unit director of storming of the Bastille sequence)
- A Star Is Born (1937, uncredited editing assistant)
- The Year's Work (1940, director, as Herbert Kerkow)

== Novels ==
- The Improved Road. (Edinburgh: Collins and Sons, 1924)
- The Cossack Sword (Edinburgh: Collins and Sons, 1926). US edition retitled for publication as Rape of Glory (Mohawk Press, 1931).
- The Fateful Star Murder (with Herbert Kerkow) (1931). Based on the Starr Faithfull murder case.
- Where the Cobra Sings (Macaulay Publishing Co, 1932; published under the pseudonym 'Cosmo Forbes')
- No Bed of Her Own. (Vanguard Press, 1932). Translated into nine languages and published in 12 countries. German title: Rose Mahoney: Her Depression. Included on the list of books burned by Hitler's orders. Reissued by Triangle Books in the late 1940s.
- Four Wives (Vanguard Press, 1932) (as by "Carlos Keith")
- Yearly Lease (Vanguard Press, 1932). Reissued by Triangle Books, 1948.
- A Laughing Woman (Vanguard Press, 1933) (as by "Carlos Keith")
- This Fool, Passion (Vanguard Press, 1934) (as by "Carlos Keith")

== Short stories ==
- "The Bagheeta". Weird Tales (July 1930). Reprint in Marvin Kaye, ed., Weird Tales: The Magazine That Never Dies (1988). "Lewton's characteristic phobia of cats, and his fear-the-dark horror techniques, are to be found, intact, in 'The Bagheeta'." p. 20.

== Unmade Films ==
- Blackbeard the Pirate with Boris Karloff from a script by Ardel Wray and Mark Robson – originally meant to follow Bedlam at RKO – Karloff would play Captain Aguilar, an American pirate operating out of Charleston
- Die Gently Stranger by David Tutaeff, a thriller set in Stockholm, developed for RKO
- Father Malachy’s Miracle story about a Roman Catholic priest set in Edinburgh, developed for RKO
- If This Be Known – murder story to star Dick Powell developed at RKO
- The Lawyer aka The Biggest Thief in Paris adaptation of Ferenc Molnár play, a comedy about the partnership of a thief and a lawyer who depend upon one another's skill for success – to star Robert Cummings and Marion Carr and directed by William Cameron Menzies – to be made by RKO in 1946 but cancelled
- None So Blind – psychological thriller adapted by Michael Hogan from a novel by Mitchell Wilson to be directed by Jean Renoir, scheduled to start at RKO in 1946 but postponed then cancelled
- A Mask for Lucrezia – developed at Paramount, script by Michael Hogan and Ardel Wray, became Bride of Vengeance and made without Lewton
- Cricket on the Hearth adaptation of Charles Dickens story developed at Paramount
- Wild Oranges – adaptation of Joseph Hergesheimer's book, which had been filmed by King Vidor – developed at MGM
- Ticonderoga – thriller set during the American Revolutionary War from script by Lewton, considered by Universal for filming before Lewton was assigned Apache Drums
