= The Leopard Man =

1943 film by Jacques Tourneur

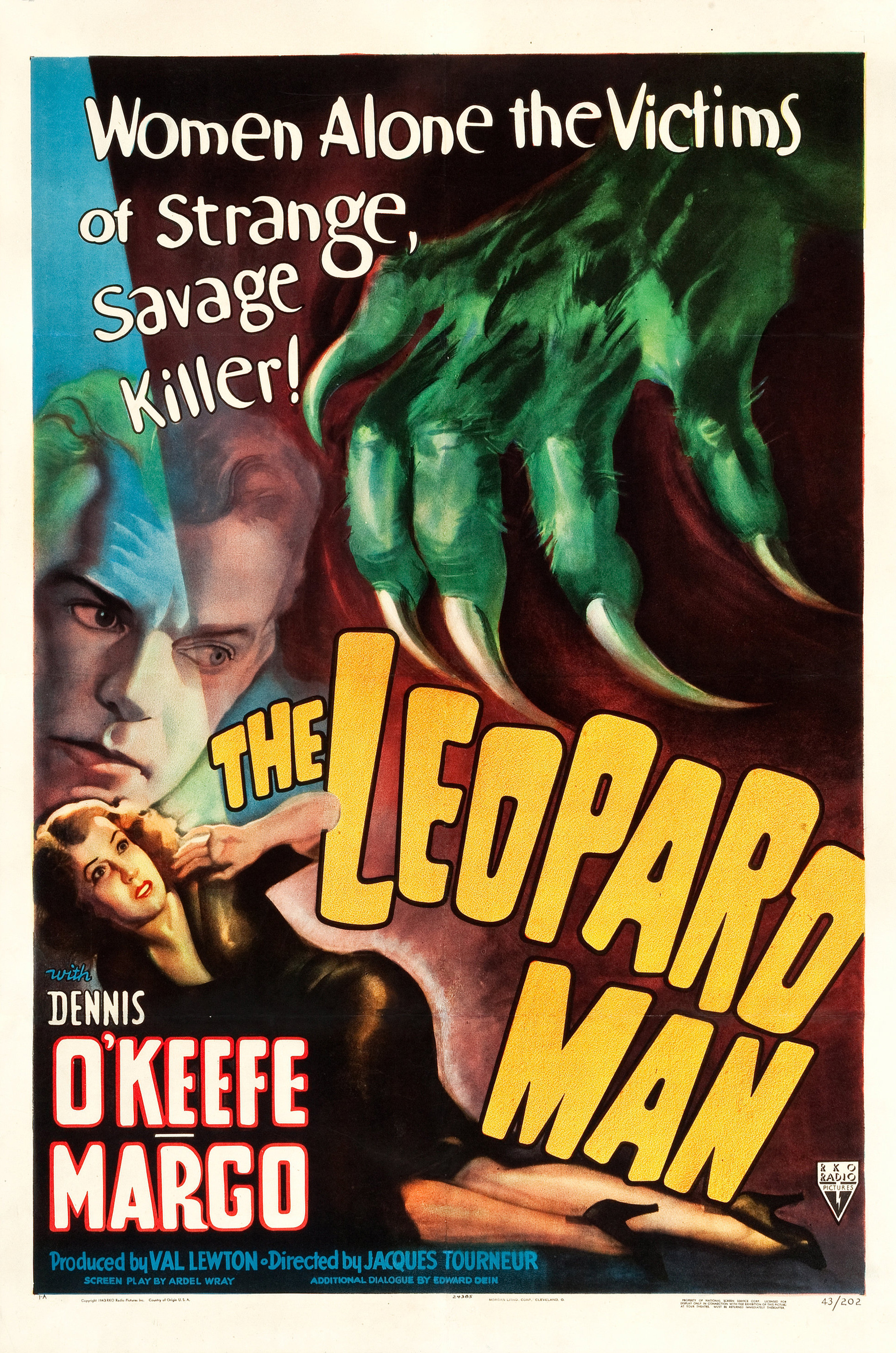
- Theatrical release poster by William Rose
- Directed by: Jacques Tourneur
- Written by: Ardel Wray; Edward Dein
- Based on: Black Alibi; 1942 novel by Cornell Woolrich
- Produced by: Val Lewton
- Starring: Dennis O'Keefe; Margo; Jean Brooks
- Cinematography: Robert De Grasse
- Edited by: Mark Robson
- Music by: Roy Webb
- Distributed by: RKO Radio Pictures Inc.
- Release date: May 8, 1943
- Running time: 66 minutes
- Country: United States
- Language: English
- Budget: ≈ $150,000

The Leopard Man is a 1943 American horror film directed by Jacques Tourneur, and starring Dennis O'Keefe, Jean Brooks, and Margo. Based on the book Black Alibi by Cornell Woolrich, it follows a series of violent murders in a town in New Mexico, which coincide with the escape of a leopard from a nightclub.

It is one of the first American films to attempt an even remotely realistic portrayal of a serial killer (although that term had yet to be coined).

== Plot ==
In an unnamed New Mexico border town, nightclub promoter Jerry Manning hires a black leopard as a publicity stunt for his girlfriend, Kiki Walker, a performer there. Kiki uses the opportunity to upstage the act of her rival, Clo-Clo, by making an entrance into the night club with the leopard on a leash. Angered, Clo-Clo frightens the leopard with her castanets, and it escapes, fleeing into the night. Charlie, the Native American owner of the leopard who rented it to Jerry, begins pestering him for money to replace the cat.

That night, Teresa, a young local woman, goes to purchase corn meal for her family's dinner. Under a bridge in an arroyo, she encounters the leopard and flees to her house. She is killed at the door just before her family is able to let her back in the house. The medical examiner rules Teresa's death an accident, concluding she was mauled by the leopard. Shortly after, Consuelo, another local, goes to visit her father's grave in the cemetery on her birthday, planning a secret rendezvous with her fiancé Raoul afterward. Lost in thought after apparently being stood up, Consuelo fails to leave before the gatekeeper locks the gate and finds herself trapped within the cemetery's stone walls. When help arrives, Consuelo is found, another apparent victim of the leopard.

After learning of the second murder, Jerry goes to the police and asks why the leopard has remained within the city, as he was told it would naturally flee to the wilderness. Charlie also questions whether the leopard killed Consuelo, but he is goaded by the local historian and museum curator Galbraith into believing he may be responsible, committing the murders during his nightly alcohol binges in which he blacks out. At his request, Charlie is kept in a jail cell overnight. Clo-Clo spends the evening at the nightclub with an elderly wealthy man, who gives her a $100 bill. Afterward, she visits Maria, a fortune teller, who warns her that "something black" is coming to her. En route home, Clo-Clo loses the $100 bill. When she goes back out to find it, she is attacked and murdered.

Kiki and Jerry prepare to leave for Chicago, coinciding with an annual procession that occurs in the town commemorating a massacre of Native Americans by the Conquistadors. As they depart for their train, Kiki and Jerry are given a bouquet of flowers from Galbraith, which Kiki wishes to place on Consuelo's grave before they leave town. At the cemetery, they are met by Charlie, who notifies them his leopard has been found shot dead in the arroyo, and its fur taken; he presumes the cat has been dead for at least a week, suggesting a human is responsible for the murders. Charlie recalls having seen Galbraith in the area and suspects he killed the leopard. Jerry attempts to turn Galbraith in to the police, but they do not believe him.

During the procession that night, Galbraith hears a woman's scream at the cemetery. He subsequently enters the museum, where he hears the sound of the castanets echoing. Shortly after, Kiki arrives at the museum, where she offers to accompany Galbraith in viewing the procession. She convinces Galbraith to turn off the lights, remarking they will better be able to watch the procession. Galbraith agrees, and once the lights are off, Kiki drops a pair of castanets. Galbraith attacks her, but she is saved by Jerry. Galbraith flees into the street, where he is eventually stopped among the procession marchers. Confronted by Jerry and Raoul, Galbraith confesses to having murdered both Consuelo and Clo-Clo. He admits to having been inspired to do so after witnessing the leopard maul Teresa to death. Seeking vengeance, Raoul shoots and kills Galbraith.

Later, while at the funeral parlor, Jerry and Kiki reaffirm their love for one another before leaving town.

== Cast ==
- Dennis O'Keefe as Jerry Manning
- Margo as Gabriella "Clo-Clo"
- Jean Brooks as Kiki Walker
- Isabel Jewell as Maria, the Fortune Teller
- Marguerite Sylva as Marta
- Margaret Landry as Terésa Delgado
- Abner Biberman as Charlie
- James Bell as Dr. Galbraith
- Tuulikki Paananen as Consuelo Contreras
- Richard Martin as Raoul Belmonte ‡
- Fely Franquelli as Rosita Contreras ‡
- Ariel Heath as Eloise ‡

‡ indicates uncredited cast member

== Production and release ==
Production took place from February 9, 1943 until March 8, 1943, on a budget of approximately $150,000. The film was released on 8 May 1943.

== Critical reaction ==
=== Initial response ===
Upon its initial theatrical release, The Leopard Man received mixed reviews. In their 1943 review of the film, Bosley Crowther of The New York Times called the film "half-baked", and wrote "The Leopard Man is nothing but a feeble and obvious attempt to frighten and shock the audience with a few exercises in mayhem."

Tourneur later said he "didn’t like" the film as "it was too exotic, it was neither fish nor fowl: a series of vignettes, and it didn’t hold together. There were some startling things in that story... But there were too many bad scenes, and even though we used an effective Mexican birthday song, the overall effect was spotty, uneven."

=== Reassessment ===
In the subsequent years, following the film's release, modern critical response has been mostly positive, with many critics praising the film's atmosphere, direction, and suspense. On Rotten Tomatoes, The Leopard Man holds an approval rating of 89%, based on 18 reviews, with a weighted average rating of 7.37/10.

Ed Gonzalez of Slant awarded the film four out of four stars, praising Tourneur's use of sound and shadows to create tension. Dennis Schwartz of Ozus' World Movie Reviews rated the film a grade A, writing, "Tourneur's fast-paced film is armed with a taut and intelligent script, and is one of those memorable films that gets even better with age like a good wine."

== Legacy ==
The Leopard Man has acquired a cult following over the years, and is now considered a cult classic. It has been included in multiple lists at various media publications as one of the greatest horror films ever made. Indiewire placed it at No. 90 in its "The 100 Greatest Horror Movies of All-Time". Slant listed it at number 30 in its "The 100 Best Horror Movies of All Time".
