= Isle of the Dead (film) =

1945 film by Mark Robson

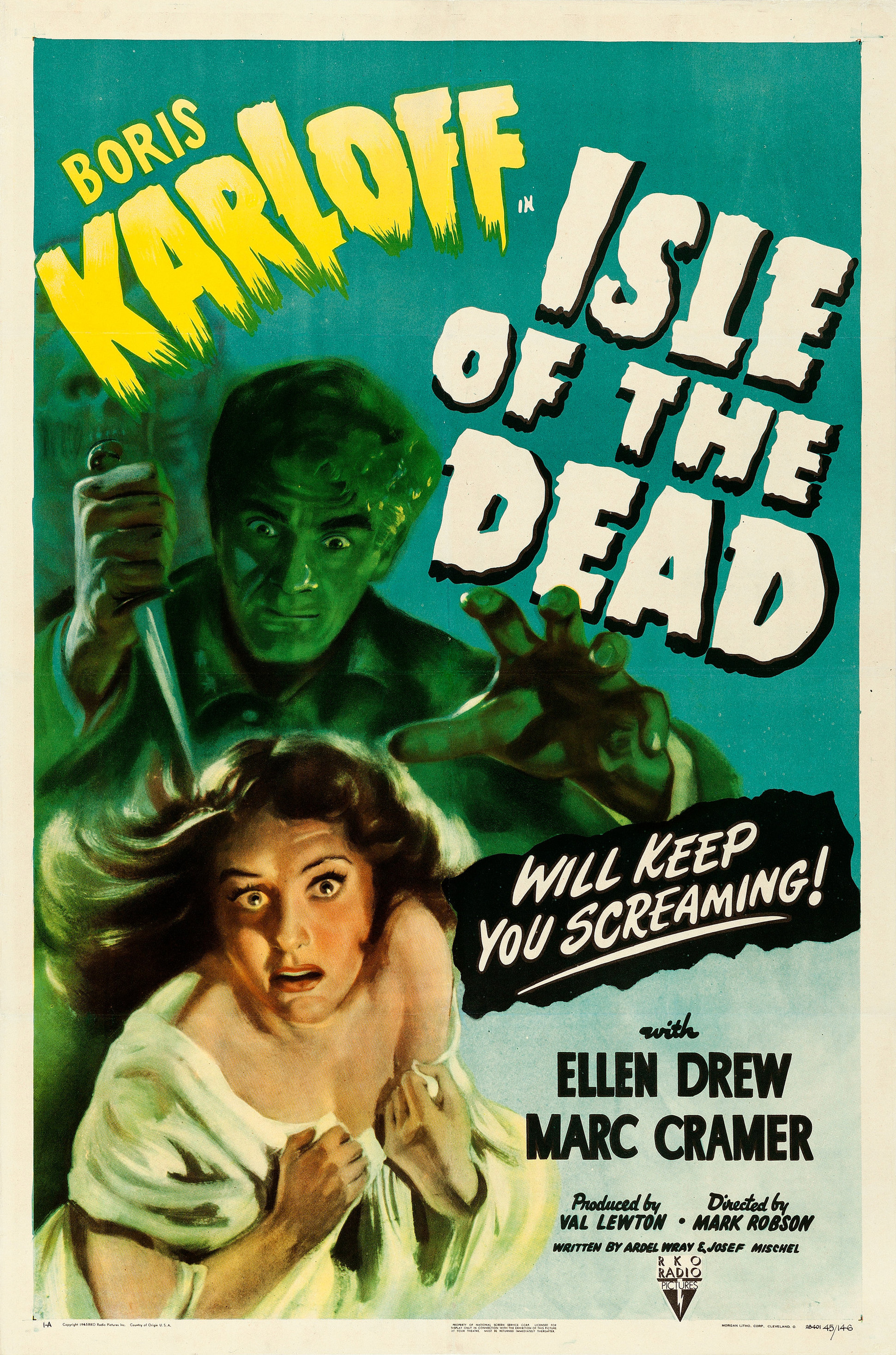
- Theatrical release poster by William Rose
- Directed by: Mark Robson
- Written by: Ardel Wray; Val Lewton (uncredited); Josef Mischel (uncredited)
- Produced by: Val Lewton
- Starring: Boris Karloff; Ellen Drew
- Cinematography: Jack MacKenzie
- Edited by: Lyle Boyer
- Music by: Leigh Harline
- Distributed by: RKO Radio Pictures
- Release date: September 7, 1945 (U.S.)
- Running time: 72 minutes
- Country: United States
- Language: English
- Budget: $246,000
- Box office: $383,000

Isle of the Dead is a 1945 American horror film directed by Mark Robson and made for RKO Radio Pictures by producer Val Lewton. The film's script was inspired by the painting Isle of the Dead by Arnold Böcklin, which appears behind the title credits, though the film was originally titled Camilla during production. It was written by frequent Lewton collaborator Ardel Wray. It starred Boris Karloff. Isle of the Dead was the second of three films Lewton made with Karloff, and the fourth of five pictures Robson directed for Lewton.

== Plot ==
An onscreen text warns of the superstitious belief in a vorvolaka, a malevolent force in human form. The film properly begins during the Balkan Wars of 1912. While his troops are burying their dead, General Pherides and American reporter Oliver Davis visit the Isle of the Dead to pay their respects to the General's long-dead wife. They discover the crypt despoiled; hearing a woman singing on the supposedly uninhabited island, they set out to find her. They also find retired Swiss archeologist Dr. Aubrecht, his Greek housekeeper Madame Kyra, British diplomat Mr. St. Aubyn and his pale and sickly wife, her youthful Greek companion Thea, and English tinsmith Henry Robbins.

Aubrecht apologizes for his part 15 years before in inspiring local peasants to rob graves for valuable Greek artifacts. Kyra whispers to Pherides that a vorvolaka, in the guise of the red and rosy Thea, is in their midst. Pherides laughs at such superstition and accepts Aubrecht's invitation to spend the night as his guest.

The next morning, Robbins is dead. Dr. Drossos is summoned; he determines the cause to be septicemic plague and quarantines the island. He explains how plague is passed and how it may be eradicated in one day if the hot, dry sirocco winds arrive. The archaeologist says that Kyra's explanation – that God sends the plague to punish them for harboring a vorvolaka – makes just as much sense. When Mr. St. Aubyn dies, the General demands that his body be buried immediately, to the horror of the cataleptic Mrs. St. Aubyn, who fears premature burial.

Next to die is Dr. Drossos, proving that the advice of modern science does not guarantee victory over the disease. Suspicion returns to Thea, and Kyra harasses her with taunts and threats. Pherides vows that he will kill Thea if evidence appears that she is vorvolaka. Fearing for Thea's life, Oliver plans to escape with her, but Pherides destroys the only boat. Mrs. St. Aubyn falls into a cataleptic trance; everyone except Thea believes her to be dead, and they entomb her. Oliver and Aubrecht believe the cause to be plague, but Kyra and Pherides believe it to be the doing of the vorvolaka. Oliver advises Thea to stay away from Pherides.

The winds change, and the sirocco has arrived, but it is too late for Pherides, who exhibits symptoms of the plague. Mrs. St. Aubyn awakens from her catalepsy but has been driven insane by being buried alive. Escaping the tomb, she kills Kyra, stabs Pherides as he attempts to kill Thea, and then leaps off a cliff to her death. As Pherides is dying, he swears that he has seen the vorvolaka and warns that she must be killed. "It is done", says Dr. Aubrecht, sympathetic to Pherides' peculiar madness. "The general was simply a man who was trying to protect us", he offers as eulogy.

== Cast ==
- Boris Karloff as Gen. Nikolas Pherides
- Ellen Drew as Thea
- Marc Cramer as Oliver Davis
- Katherine Emery as Mrs. Mary St. Aubyn
- Helene Thimig as Madame Kyra
- Alan Napier as St. Aubyn
- Jason Robards Sr. as Aubrecht
- Ernst Deutsch as Dr. Drossos
- Sherry Hall as Col. Kobestes
- Erick Hanson as Officer
- Skelton Knaggs as Henry Robbins

== Production ==
Filming began for about two weeks in July 1944 until production was suspended when Karloff required a back operation. It was completed in December. In the interim, after Karloff had recovered from the surgery but before the cast of Isle of the Dead could be reassembled, he and Lewton made The Body Snatcher. The film had a troubled production, and the central female character of the original script (named "Catherine") was deleted entirely from the tale.

== Score ==
Leigh Harline's score makes use of another work inspired by Böcklin's painting, Sergei Rachmaninoff's tone poem, "Isle of the Dead". Harline borrows themes and copies their orchestration, without violating copyright. He made no use of the public-domain "Dies Irae".

== Reception ==
=== Box office ===
The film premiered in New York City on 7 September 1945. The cost of Isle of the Dead at completion was $246,000, the highest yet for a Lewton horror film, but with domestic rentals of $266,000 and foreign rentals of $117,000, it made only $13,000 in profit for RKO. It was re-issued in 1953 on a double bill with Mighty Joe Young, and made its television debut in 1959.

=== Critical reception ===
Film critic and author James Agee reviewed it in 1945: "Val Lewton-Mark Robson horror film, with Karloff...especially effective. Tedious, overloaded, diffuse, and at moments arty, yet in many ways to be respected, up to its last half-hour or so; then it becomes as brutally frightening and gratifying a horror movie as I can remember." Leslie Halliwell gave it two of four stars: "Glum, ghoulish melodrama with some neatly handled shocks; quite different from any other horror film." Author and film critic Leonard Maltin awarded the film three out of a possible four stars, complimenting the film's production. Director Martin Scorsese placed Isle of the Dead on his list of the 11 scariest horror films of all time. On review aggregator website Rotten Tomatoes the film has an approval rating of 90% based on 21 reviews, with an average rating of 6.5/10.

== See also ==
- Boris Karloff filmography
