= The Seventh Victim =

1943 film by Mark Robson

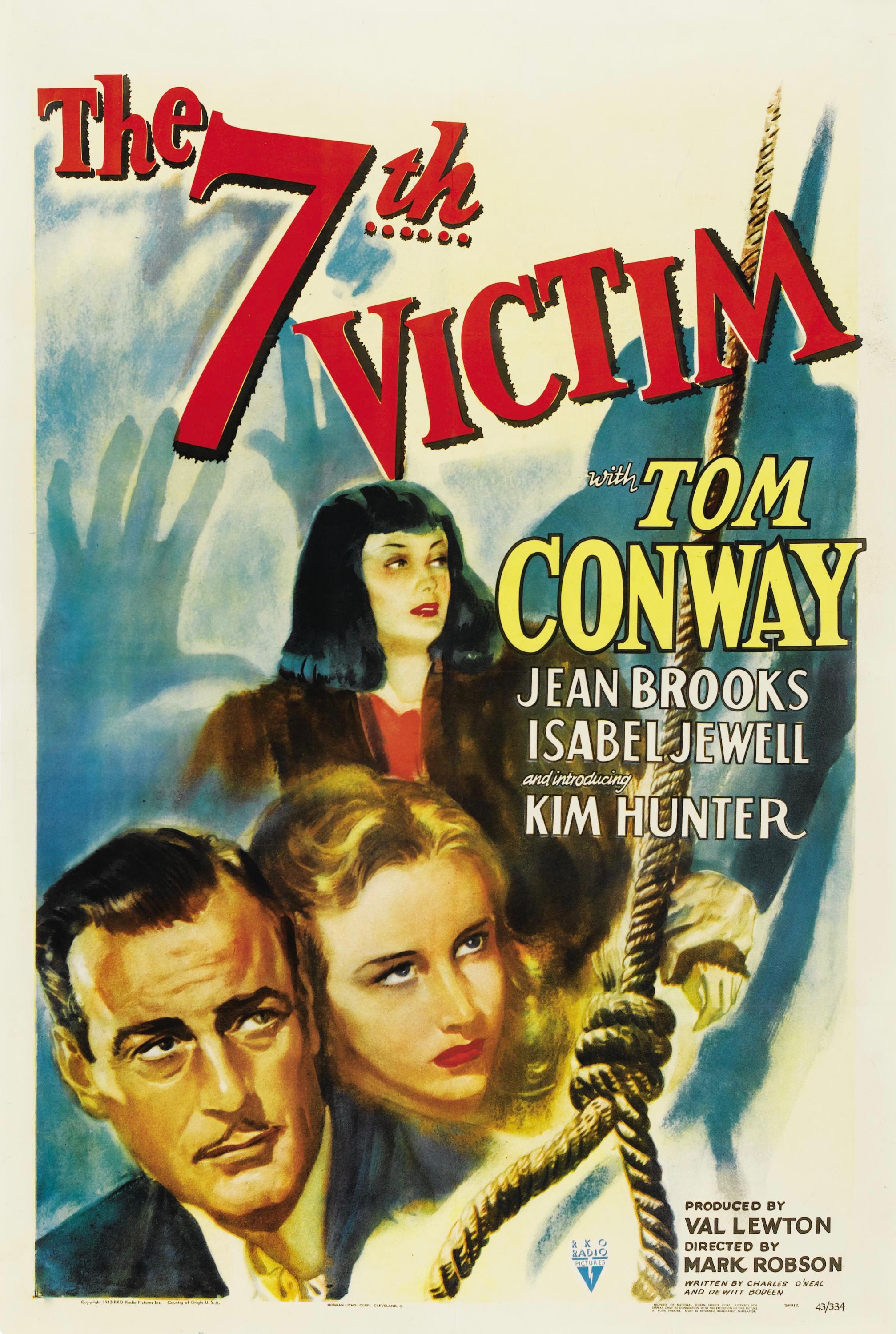
- Theatrical release poster by William Rose
- Directed by: Mark Robson
- Written by: Charles O'Neal; DeWitt Bodeen
- Produced by: Val Lewton
- Starring: Tom Conway; Jean Brooks; Isabel Jewell; Kim Hunter; Hugh Beaumont
- Cinematography: Nicholas Musuraca
- Edited by: John Lockert
- Music by: Roy Webb
- Distributed by: RKO Radio Pictures
- Release date: August 21, 1943
- Running time: 71 minutes
- Language: English
- Budget: $100,000 (est.)

The Seventh Victim is a 1943 American horror film directed by Mark Robson and starring Tom Conway, Jean Brooks, Isabel Jewell, and Kim Hunter in her film debut. Written by Charles O'Neal and DeWitt Bodeen, and produced by Val Lewton for RKO Radio Pictures, the film focuses on a young woman who stumbles on an underground cult of devil worshippers in Greenwich Village, New York City, while searching for her missing sister. It marks Robson's directorial debut.

O'Neal had written the script as a murder mystery, set in California, that followed a woman hunted by a serial killer. Bodeen revised the script, basing the story on a Satanic society meeting he attended in New York City and setting it as a prequel to Cat People (1942), with Conway reprising his role as Dr. Louis Judd. Filming took place over 24 days in May 1943 at RKO Studios in Los Angeles.

Released on August 21, 1943, the film failed to garner significant income at the box office and received mixed reviews from critics, who found its narrative incoherence a primary fault. It was later revealed that Robson and editor John Lockert had removed four substantial scenes from the final cut, including an extended conclusion. In spite of its mixed reception, it became a cult film in England, noted by critics for its homoerotic undertones.

== Plot ==
Theatrical trailer

Mary Gibson, a young woman at Highcliffe Academy, a boarding school, is informed by the principal that her older sister and only relative, Jacqueline, has gone missing and has not paid Mary's tuition in months. Mary decides to leave the school to find her sister, who owns La Sagesse, a cosmetics company in New York City.

Upon arriving in New York, Mary meets Esther Redi at the cosmetics company. Esther, who was Jacqueline's assistant, tells Mary that Jacqueline sold the business to her eight months ago. Jacqueline's close friend and La Sagesse employee, Frances Fallon, claims to have seen Jacqueline the week before at Dante, an Italian restaurant in Greenwich Village.

Mary soon discovers that Jacqueline has rented a room above Dante, without having moved in. Mary persuades the owners to let her see the room, which she finds empty aside from a wooden chair and a noose hanging from the ceiling. While at Dante, Mary meets Jason Hoag, a frustrated poet, who offers to help find her sister.

Mary's investigation leads her to several individuals who knew Jacqueline, including her secret husband, attorney Gregory Ward, and a psychiatrist, Dr. Louis Judd. Mary learns Jacqueline had been a patient of Judd's, seeking treatment for depression stemming from her membership in a Satanic cult called the Palladists, and her subsequent efforts to leave the group. Jacqueline was lured into joining the cult by her former co-workers at La Sagesse, particularly Esther.

Mary enlists private detective Irving August to help locate Jacqueline. When Mary and Irving break into La Sagesse after hours, Irving is stabbed to death by an unseen assailant. Mary flees into the subway, where she witnesses two men board her car, carrying Irving's corpse between them. She attempts to alert the police, but the men vanish with Irving's body before they arrive.

Judd offers to bring Mary to visit Jacqueline at his residence, where she has been in hiding. There, Mary is briefly met by Jacqueline, who gestures her to be quiet before again vanishing. Determined to remain in New York, Mary takes a job at a kindergarten. Some time later, Esther breaks into Mary's apartment and confronts her in the shower, claiming that Jacqueline murdered Irving and urging Mary to return to Highcliffe. Mary tells Gregory and Jason what Esther told her and they resolve to locate Jacqueline. They unite with Judd, who takes them to meet Jacqueline.

Jacqueline recounts how she came to join the Palladists, as well as how they had sequestered her at La Sagesse for months and how she inadvertently killed Irving, believing him to be an assassin sent by the cult to kill her. (The Palladists have a rule that any member who betrays the cult must die, and they believe Jacqueline betrayed them by discussing the cult with Judd, an outsider.)

The cult members congregate to decide Jacqueline's fate. She would be the seventh person condemned for betrayal since the founding of the cult. Believing that murder is permissible only as a last resort, the Palladists prefer to goad perceived offenders into committing suicide. Frances, because of her attachment to Jacqueline, begs the cult members to spare her, to no avail.

The cultists kidnap Jacqueline and, over several hours, harangue her to drink from a glass of poison placed before her. When her will breaks and she reaches for the glass, Frances swipes the glass out of Jacqueline's hand and to the floor. The Palladists let Jacqueline leave, but they send an assassin to follow her. The assassin chases her through the streets with a switchblade, but she eludes him and returns to her rented room above Dante.

In the rooming house hallway, Jacqueline briefly encounters her neighbor, Mimi, a terminally ill young woman. Mimi confesses to Jacqueline that she is afraid to die, and plans to have one last night out on the town. Jacqueline enters her own apartment and apparently hangs herself; Mimi hears the thud of the chair falling over as she leaves for the evening.

== Cast ==
- Tom Conway as Doctor Louis Judd
- Jean Brooks as Jacqueline Gibson
- Isabel Jewell as Frances Fallon
- Kim Hunter as Mary Gibson
- Evelyn Brent as Natalie Cortez
- Erford Gage as Jason Hoag
- Ben Bard as Mr. Brun
- Hugh Beaumont as Gregory Ward
- Chef Milani as Mr. Jacob
- Marguerita Sylva as Mrs. Bella Romari

=== Uncredited roles ===
- Mary Newton as Esther Redi
- Joan Barclay as Gladys
- Wally Brown as Durk
- Feodor Chaliapin Jr. as Leo
- Richard Davies as Radeaux's partner
- Bud Geary as police sergeant
- Barbara Hale as subway passenger
- William Halligan as Paul Radeaux
- Lloyd Ingraham as La Sagesse nightwatchman
- Lou Lubin as Private Detective Irving August
- Eve March as Mildred Gilchrist
- Ottola Nesmith as Miss Lowood
- Dewey Robinson as conductor
- Elizabeth Russell as Mimi
- Jamesson Shade as Swenson

== Themes and analysis ==
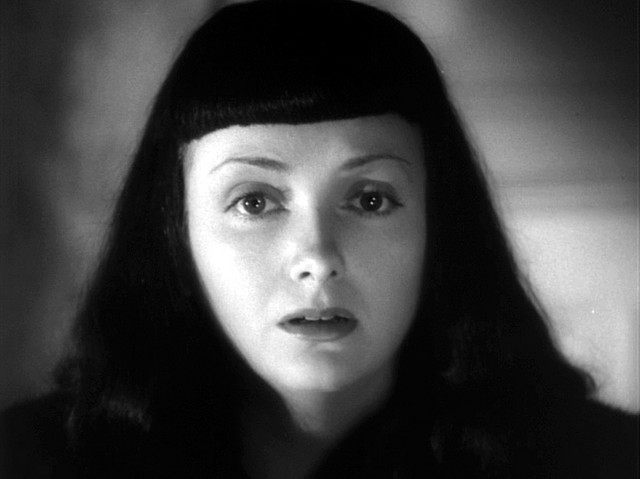
The fate of Jean Brooks' character in the film has been described as one of the most "baffling" in horror film history

=== Nihilism ===
Most controversially, the film resolves with the suicide of one of the main characters (contrary to the spirit if not the letter of the Production Code). Film historian Steve Haberman, in his audio commentary for the 2005 Warner Bros. DVD release of the film, characterized Jacqueline as the film's philosophical center, noting her existentialist views: "Her life is the very nightmare version of life that Val Lewton portrays in many of his movies: a meaningless existence, trying to find meaning, always failing and in the end seeking a sort of peace through death." Film scholar J. P. Telotte echoed this sentiment, stating: "The Seventh Victim explores certain ineffable fears that always haunt the human psyche, especially a fear of meaninglessness or the irrational which can make death seem almost a welcome release from life."

=== Homoeroticism ===
Critics have noted homosexual undercurrents running through the film, particularly in Jacqueline's character and her relationship with Frances, a cult member who is an employee at the company she formerly owned. The film was featured in Turner Classic Movies' Screened Out, which celebrated gay and lesbian themes in classical Hollywood cinema. Other film theorists, such as Harry M. Benshoff, author of Monsters in the Closet: Homosexuality and the Horror Film (1997), have read the film's anchoring of its Palladist characters in Greenwich Village—a neighborhood with a history of gay and lesbian residents—as another prominent undercurrent. In his assessment of the film, Benshoff notes: "The Seventh Victim invokes the analogy in ways more sympathetic to homosexuality. While it could have easily fallen into the trap of using gay and lesbian signifiers to characterize its villains (i.e. homosexual = Satanist, as did Universal's The Black Cat in 1934), the film is much more complex than that." Additionally, Benshoff notes that while contemporary reviews did not comment on the film's homosexual undertones, they did note its "baffling" subtleties.

== Production ==
=== Development ===
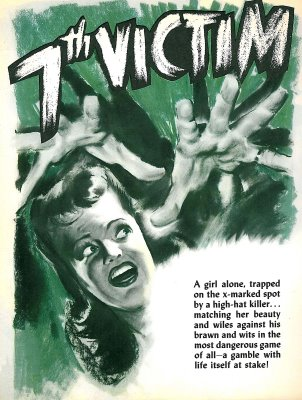
Early conceptual artwork for The Seventh Victim; the plot snippet suggests this was inspired by an earlier draft of the script, which featured a woman hunted by a serial killer.

The script for The Seventh Victim went through several incarnations in the pre-production process. One version focused on an orphan caught in a murder plot amid California's Signal Hill oil wells; in this narrative, the heroine needed to solve the orphan's identity, saving him from becoming the seventh victim of the unknown killer. This version of the script was re-written entirely by DeWitt Bodeen under the supervision of producer Val Lewton. The new plot followed a young woman who uncovers a cult of Satanists in Greenwich Village. Bodeen purportedly based his idea for the film on a real Satanic society he had encountered in New York. The script incorporated other elements of his experiences in New York: Jacqueline's cosmetics business, La Sagesse, was inspired by his previous work as a journalist reporting on cosmetic companies, and the Italian restaurant, Dante, was based on Barbetta, a restaurant in Manhattan's Theater District.

=== Filming ===
Jacques Tourneur, who had previously directed a trio of horror films for Lewton at RKO—Cat People, I Walked with a Zombie, and The Leopard Man—was originally slated to direct The Seventh Victim. However, Mark Robson, a Canadian editor who had worked as an assistant on Citizen Kane, was signed to direct instead, marking his directorial debut. It was shot over 24 days at RKO's Gower Street studio in Los Angeles, from May 5 to 29, 1943. The opening scene at the boarding school used the set featured in RKO's The Magnificent Ambersons, released the year before.

=== Post-production ===
Mark Robson and John Lockert made multiple edits to the film during post-production, according to Lewton and Bodeen, resulting in a slightly "disjointed" narrative. Lewton's son spoke about this in a 2003 interview:

[My father's] scripts were very specific about set design, camera direction, and also what you usually left to one editor—dissolves, cuts, and so on. Much of the confusion in The Seventh Victim would have been eliminated if scenes weren't cut. There was a final scene, after the woman hanged herself, that was just a horrible rehash, and it was wisely cut. It's a great ending, with the final scene taken out, but that last shot (when we hear the chair fall) needs to hold for another four or five seconds, just enough time to let it sink in. But it doesn't. The movie just ends, and the reason was because they couldn't go back to reshoot it.

— Val E. Lewton, producer Val Lewton's son, on the film.

According to Joel Siegel in Val Lewton: The Reality of Terror (1973), four key scenes were cut from the film, contributing to its narrative incoherence; among them are a sequence in which Gregory visits Mary at the kindergarten where she works, and Mary admits to him, "It would be easier if Jacqueline were dead." At the beginning of another scene—which remains in the final cut—Mary's supervisor says to her, "Aren't you the popular one? You've a visitor again," the last word making it clear she'd had an earlier visitor, Ward. A second excised scene features Judd visiting Natalie Cortez, pretending to be interested in joining the Palladists. The two discuss philosophical matters, mainly the notion that if good exists, evil exists, and one is free to choose between the two. Cortez reveals that she became a Palladist because "Life has betrayed us. We've found that there is no heaven on earth, so we must worship evil for evil's sake."

In a third excised scene, Judd again visits Natalie, indicating that he wishes to join the Palladists. In conversation, Judd unintentionally reveals that Jacqueline is staying with Mary at the rooming house. This makes the audience aware that the Palladists were able to trace Jacqueline to Mary's room to kidnap her. In the truncated theatrical print, how the Palladists found Jacqueline is left unclear. In a final scene that followed Jacqueline's suicide, Mary, Gregory, and Jason meet at the Dante restaurant. Gregory and Mary go off together, leaving Jason standing before the restaurant's mural of Dante and Beatrice, making clear his failure as an artist and lover. He says to himself: "I am alive, yet every hope I had is dead. Death can be good. Death can be happy. If I could speak like Cyrano ... then perhaps, you might understand."

== Release ==
The film premiered in the United States on August 21, 1943. Five days later, on August 26, according to the United States Copyright Office, it was registered for copyright by RKO Pictures. On September 17, 1943, the film opened theatrically at the Rialto Theatre in New York City. A total of $130,000 was spent on promotional material, including posters and lobby cards.

Though box office data for the film is unknown, according to film historian John McElwee, The Seventh Victim did not fare well with audiences upon its theatrical release, and was not a box office success. A cinema proprietor in South Carolina reported that theatergoers were disappointed: "We must have been the eighth victim; patrons walked out. Business poor. Some of the kids would not sit through it." A. C. Edwards, a theater employee in Scotia, California, said it was "without doubt the most unsatisfactory picture we have any recollection of." The failure to generate considerable income at the box office (on top of the financial failure of Lewton and Robson's follow-up picture, The Ghost Ship) would result in Lewton scrapping two planned projects, The Screaming Skull and The Amorous Ghost.

== Reception ==
=== Contemporaneous ===
Some critics praised elements of the film, such as Kate Cameron of the New York Daily News, who felt that it established a "sinister atmosphere" and had an "incredible" story; she did, however, criticize the performance of Brooks, whom she wrote "gives no hint of the scintillating personality Jacqueline is supposed to possess, nor does she adequately intimate the terror and fear under which she is supposed to labor." A critic from The Philadelphia Inquirer praised Brooks's performance as well as those of the rest of the cast, and described the film as "eerie, anything but cheery," noting that "director Mark Robson didn't miss many tricks calculated to send chills down the spine." Writing for the Big Spring Daily Herald, Jerry Cahill similarly felt that "the suspense of the picture is well carried out by the crack performances."

A critic of the Republican Herald also praised the film for being "packed with a suspenseful action that builds from its quiet beginning to a hair-raising conclusion." Grace Kingsley of the Los Angeles Times noted that "probably hardboiled mystery fans will be disappointed that none of the horrific rites are disclosed, but there are enough other chills and thrills to make up." A critic for the Waxahachie Daily Light praised the film for its "gripping climax", deeming it a "thrilling horror drama".

The film was likewise praised for the shadowy camera work by cinematographer Nicholas Musuraca, but criticized by some for having too many characters and a storyline that lacked cohesion; among these critics were Bosley Crowther of The New York Times, who felt that the film "might make more sense if it was run backward." Variety gave a negative review, noting: "A particularly poor script is the basis for the ills besetting this mystery melodrama. Even the occasional good performance can't offset this minor dealer."

Robson later said:

It had a rather sinister quality, of something intangible but horribly real; it had an atmosphere. I think the actors and the director had to believe very strongly in the possibilities of disaster: that something was there. We believed it ourselves. We talked ourselves into believing it. We had a kind of fidelity to that feeling. We had the characters speak throughout in a deliberately quiet, polite and subdued manner, engendering a very calculated undercurrent of possible disaster.

=== Retrospective ===
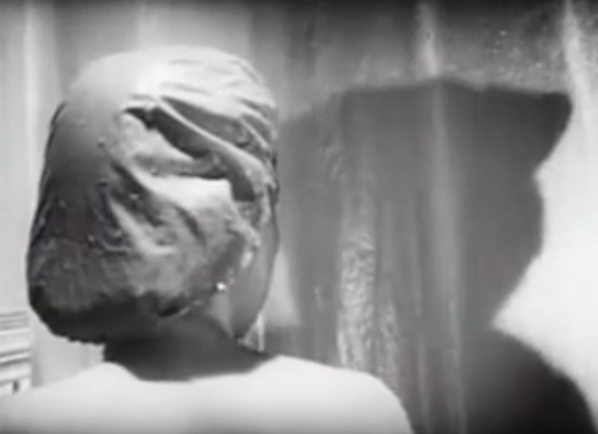
A key shower scene with Kim Hunter has been referenced by film historians as anticipating that of Psycho (1960).

Critic Jonathan Rosenbaum cited The Seventh Victim as one of his favorite horror films. Film historian Carlos Clarens also praised it, noting: "Rarely has a film succeeded so well in capturing the nocturnal menace of a large city, the terror underneath the everyday, the suggestion of hidden evil", and deemed it "hauntingly oppressive". In Guide for the Film Fanatic, Danny Peary called the film "a complete original".

TV Guide gave the film four out of five stars, noting: "While very little in the way of horrific action takes place in The Seventh Victim, the film has a haunting, lyrical, overwhelming sense of melancholy and despair to it—death is looked upon as a sweet release from the oppression of a cold, meaningless existence." They considered its conclusion "without a doubt the bleakest ending to any film ever made in Hollywood." Time Out London also praised the film, calling it Robson's "masterpiece, a brooding melodrama built around a group of Satanists ... the whole thing is held together by a remarkably effective mix of menace and metaphysics—half noir, half Gothic."

In a retrospective review of the film in The New York Times, critic Caryn James wrote: "Despite its creaky plot, The Seventh Victim is one of Lewton's best movies, a triumph of style over sense." She also noted a "terrifying scene that anticipates Psycho [in which] Mary is shocked by a visitor who breaks in while she showers." Other historians and critics, including Joel Siegel and Laurence Rickels, cited the scene as a potential precursor to the infamous shower murder in Psycho.

On the review aggregator website Rotten Tomatoes, the film holds an approval rating of 95% based on 20 reviews, with an average score of 7.5/10.

== Home media ==
The Seventh Victim was released on LaserDisc and VHS in 1986 by RKO Home Video, and again on VHS in 2002. It made its DVD debut on October 8, 2005, in a five-disc box set titled the Val Lewton Collection, comprising nine horror films released by RKO and produced by Lewton. Other films in the set include Cat People, I Walked with a Zombie, and The Ghost Ship. The Seventh Victim was also paired on a single-disc DVD alongside Shadows in the Dark, a documentary on Lewton's career. In July 2024, The Criterion Collection announced a forthcoming 4K/Blu-ray release of the film, as well as standalone Blu-ray and DVD editions, each as part of the double feature set paired with I Walked with a Zombie. The Criterion Collection released these editions on October 8, 2024.

== Musical score ==
The score was composed by Roy Webb, and is possibly the only Hollywood film score of the period to end in a minor key. Film historian Edward Bansak notes that Webb's score for the film is remarkably understated: "Rather than use a strong theme to accompany the chills, Webb relies upon single chords and ominous strains of dissonance that create an effect not unlike the characteristic work of Bernard Herrmann."

On June 3, 2000, a compilation disc of Webb's musical scores from Lewton's series of horror films—titled Music from the Films of Val Lewton—was released by Alliance, featuring ten musical tracks from The Seventh Victim.

=== Track listing ===
All tracks are written by Roy Webb.

Music from the Films of Val Lewton (tracks 17–26)
| No. | Title | Length |
|---|---|---|
| 17. | "Main Title" | 1:11 |
| 18. | "Principal's Office" | 1:49 |
| 19. | "Mary Sees Jacqueline" | 3:31 |
| 20. | "Jacqueline Is Found" | 1:35 |
| 21. | "Jacqueline" | 0:57 |
| 22. | "The Palladists' Trial" | 3:03 |
| 23. | "The Chase" | 2:24 |
| 24. | "Desirous of Death" | 1:41 |
| 25. | "Love Scene" | 2:10 |
| 26. | "End Title" | 0:27 |

== Related works ==
The film is loosely connected to Jacques Tourneur's Cat People (1942)—another film produced by Lewton with a screenplay by Bodeen–via the appearance of the Dr. Louis Judd character, who appears in both films. In The Seventh Victim, Judd recounts to a poet that he once knew a mysterious woman who was in fact a "raving lunatic" (referencing Irena Dubrovna, the protagonist of Cat People). In memos and early drafts of the script, Conway's character was referred to as "Mr. Siegfried"; film scholars believe that the character's name was changed to provide continuity between the two films and to capitalize on Cat People's success. The Judd character, however, had died in Cat People, calling into question the relation of the two fictional narratives. Lewton historian Edmund Bansak notes that the films are also linked thematically through a preoccupation with nihilism.

== Sources ==
- Bansak, Edmund G. (2003). Fearing the Dark: The Val Lewton Career. Jefferson, North Carolina: McFarland & Company. ISBN 978-0-7864-1709-4.
- Benshoff, Harry (1997). Monsters in the Closet: Homosexuality and the Horror Film. Manchester University Press. ISBN 978-0-7190-4473-1.
- Benshoff, Harry (2015). The Dread of Difference: Gender and the Horror Film. Texas Film and Media Studies (2 ed.). Austin, Texas: University of Texas Press. ISBN 978-0-292-77245-8.
- David, Bleiler, ed. (2004). TLA Video & DVD Guide 2005: The Discerning Film Lover's Guide. New York: St. Martin's Griffin. ISBN 978-0-312-31690-7.
- Bowker, R. R. (1971). The American Film Institute Catalog of Motion Pictures. Vol. 2. Los Angeles: American Film Institute.
- Bowker, R. R. (1988). Variety's Complete Home Video Directory. Variety.
- Christopher, Nicholas (2010). Somewhere in the Night. New York: Simon & Schuster. ISBN 978-1-4391-3761-1.
- Crowther, Bosley (September 18, 1943). "Who's Looney Again?". The New York Times.
- Films in Review. Vol. 14. National Board of Review of Motion Pictures, 1963. 1963.
- Haberman, Steve (2005). The Seventh Victim (DVD audio commentary). Los Angeles: Warner Bros. Home Video. ISBN 978-0-7806-5080-0. OCLC 225305251.
- Heffernan, Kevin (1997). The Horror Genre and the American Film Industry. Vol. 1. Madison, Wisconsin: University of Wisconsin Press.
- Library of Congress (1943). Catalog of Copyright Entries: Part 1, Group 3: Dramatic Compositions, Motion Pictures. Vol. 16. Washington, D.C.: Library of Congress.
- Lyden, John, ed. (2009). The Routledge Companion to Religion and Film. Abingdon-on-Thames: Routledge. ISBN 978-0-415-60187-0.
- Mank, Gregory William (1999). Women in Horror Films, 1940s. Jefferson, North Carolina: McFarland & Company. ISBN 978-0-7864-2335-4.
- Mank, Gregory William (2009). Bela Lugosi and Boris Karloff: The Expanded Story of a Haunting Collaboration. Jefferson, North Carolina: McFarland & Company. ISBN 978-0-7864-3480-0.
- McElwee, John (2013). Showmen, Sell It Hot!: Movies as Merchandise in Golden Era Hollywood. Paladin Communications. ISBN 978-0-996-27401-2.
- Murphy, Robert (2006). Directors in British and Irish Cinema: A Reference Companion. London: British Film Institute. ISBN 978-1-84457-126-0.
- Peary, Danny (1986). Guide for the Film Fanatic. New York: Simon & Schuster. ISBN 978-0-671-61081-4.
- Pitts, Michael R. (2015). RKO Radio Pictures Horror, Science Fiction and Fantasy Films, 1930–1956. Jefferson, North Carolina: McFarland & Company. ISBN 978-0-7864-6047-2.
- Prawer, Siegbert Salomon (1980). Caligari's Children: The Film as Tale of Terror. Oxford University Press. ISBN 978-0-19-217584-7.
- Rickels, Laurence A. (2016). The Psycho Records. New York: Wallflower Press. ISBN 978-0-231-18112-9.
- Siegel, Joel E. (1973). Val Lewton: The Reality of Terror. Cinema One. Vol. 22. New York: Viking Press. ISBN 978-0-670-01955-7.
- Snelson, Tim (2014). Phantom Ladies: Hollywood Horror and the Home Front. Rutgers, New Jersey: Rutgers University Press. ISBN 978-0-8135-7042-6.
- Telotte, J. P. (1985). Dreams of Darkness: Fantasy and the Films of Val Lewton. Urbana, Illinois: University of Illinois Press. ISBN 978-0-252-01154-2.
- Towlson, Jon (2014). Subversive Horror Cinema: Countercultural Messages of Films from Frankenstein to the Present. Jefferson, North Carolina: McFarland & Company. ISBN 978-0-7864-7469-1.
