= The Cat Creature =

1973 television film by Curtis Harrington

- Title card
- Genre: Horror
- Teleplay by: Robert Bloch
- Story by: Douglas S. Cramer; Wilfred Lloyd Baumes; Robert Bloch
- Directed by: Curtis Harrington
- Starring: Meredith Baxter; David Hedison; Gale Sondergaard
- Music by: Leonard Rosenman
- Country of origin: United States
- Original language: English

Production
- Producer: Douglas S. Cramer
- Production location: Los Angeles
- Cinematography: Charles Rosher
- Editor: Stan Ford
- Running time: 74 minutes
- Production companies: Douglas S. Cramer Company; Screen Gems

Original release
- Network: ABC
- Release: December 11, 1973

The Cat Creature is a 1973 American made-for-television horror film produced by Douglas S. Cramer and directed by Curtis Harrington from a teleplay by Robert Bloch and starring Meredith Baxter, David Hedison and Gale Sondergaard. The film serves as a tribute to the low-budget Val Lewton horror films of the 1940s and also features an appearance by Kent Smith, who starred in Lewton's original classic Cat People (1942) and its sequel The Curse of the Cat People (1944). It originally premiered as the ABC Movie of the Week on December 11, 1973.

Robert Bloch recounts in his autobiography how the film was originally planned as a starring vehicle for Diahann Carroll but that by the time the script was completed and approved, Miss Carroll had fulfilled her contractual obligations with the network and he had to rewrite her role. He also writes of other difficulties with the scripting. After being informed the script ran twelve minutes too long, and Bloch's laboriously editing the screenplay to make it run to time, on a viewing of the rushes it was found the film now ran twelve minutes too short. Most of the sets had already been torn down. Bloch had to work out how to put twelve minutes back into the film so it would go out over the network on the appointed date.

== Plot ==
Late one evening, Frank Lucas, a licensed appraiser, goes to the home of a deceased client to finish taking inventory of the estate, including ancient artifacts. He discovers a sarcophagus in the basement that holds a mummy wearing a solid gold amulet displaying a cat's head with emerald eyes. While Lucas is out of the room, Joe Sung emerges from the shadows and steals the amulet from the mummy's corpse, unleashing a curse imposed thousands of years ago by a cat goddess. Hearing Lucas returning, Sung makes his way back into the dark. Lucas is promptly attacked and clawed to death by a mysterious black feline that howls like a jackal.

Later, Joe Sung tries to pawn the amulet at The Sorcerer's Shop, an establishment that specializes in occult items, however, the proprietress, Hester Black, throws him out.

Meanwhile, Lt. Marco of the local police department is investigating the murder of Mr. Lucas with the expert advice of Roger Edmonds, a professor who specializes in archeology. The theft of the amulet sets off a murderous chain of events involving Black, Lt. Marco, Edmonds, Sung, a salesgirl named Rena Carter, and a homicidal black cat with glowing green eyes.

== Cast ==
- Meredith Baxter as Rena Carter
- David Hedison as Prof. Roger Edmonds
- Gale Sondergaard as Hester Black
- John Carradine as The Hotel Clerk
- Renne Jarrett as Sherry Hastings
- Keye Luke as The Thief – Joe Sung
- Kent Smith as Frank Lucas
- Stuart Whitman as Lt. Marco
- Milton Parson as The Deputy Coroner
- Peter Lorre Jr. as The Pawnbroker
- John Abbott as Dr. Reinhart
- Virgil Frye as Donovan
- William Sims as Bert

== Reception ==
John Stanley writes of the film: "Robert Bloch supernatural teleplay with in-jokes about movie cats, but it's pallid stuff. Gale Sondergaard, one time Spider Woman, is a cat goddess claiming victims to possess a golden amulet. Kent Smith, who starred in Lewton's original classic Cat People (1942) and its sequel The Curse of the Cat People (1944), has a cameo. Curtis Harrington needed nine lives to direct David Hedison, Stuart Whitman, Keye Luke, John Carradine; Peter Lorre, Jr. turns up in one scene with a knife in his back. Has the bite of a kitten instead of a jungle marauder."

Michael Weldon calls the film "an "okay attempt to recreate a Val Lewton '40s mood. Gale Sondergaard (who had only appeared in one film since 1949 because of the Communist scare blacklist) is Hester Black, a mysterious shopkeeper. John Carradine, Keye Luke, Kent Smith (Cat People) and John Abbott (The Vampire's Ghost) are all on hand to remind you of the B-movie roots."

== See also ==
- List of American films of 1973
- ABC Movie of the Week
