= Cat People (1942 film) =

1942 film by Jacques Tourneur

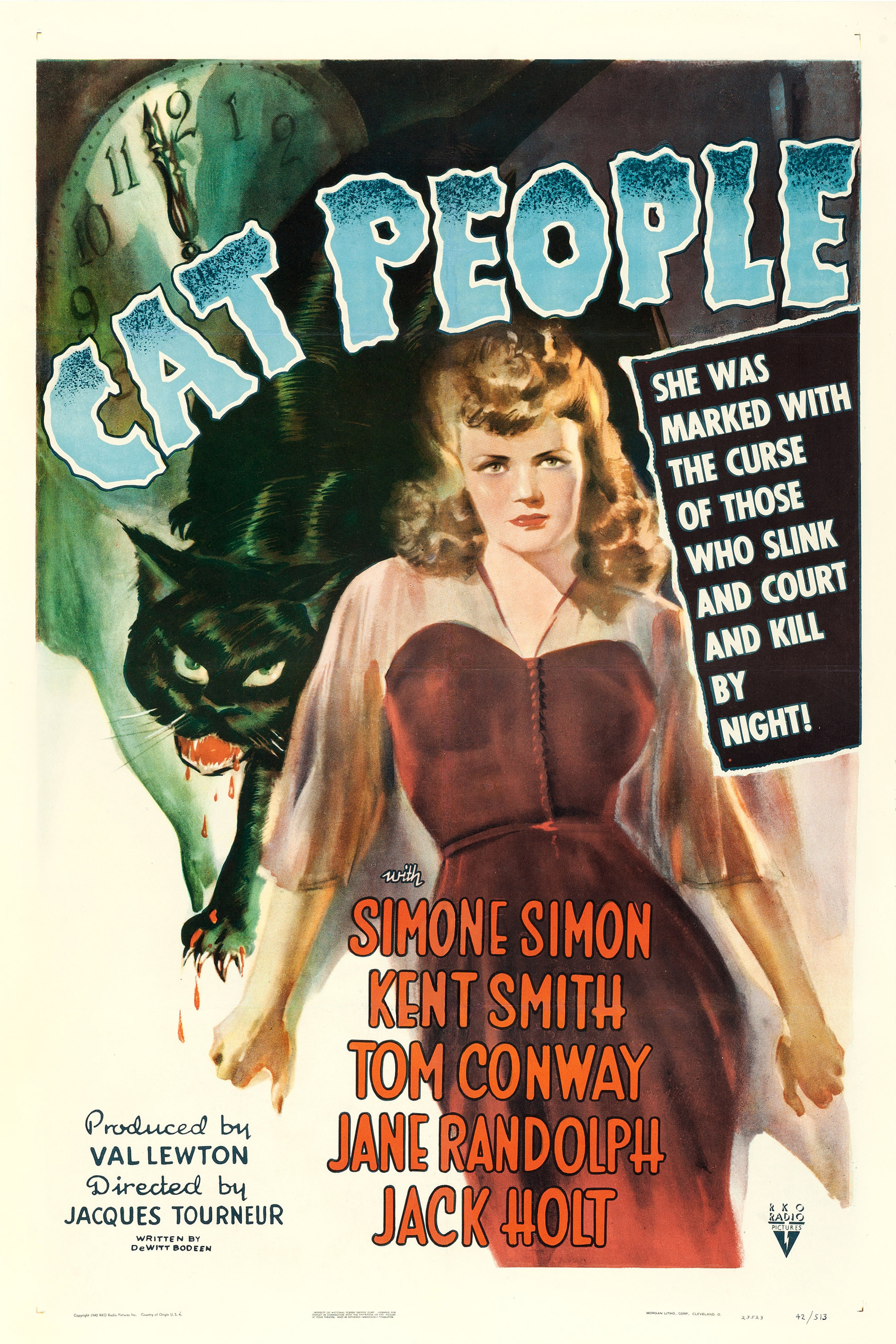
- Theatrical release poster
- Directed by: Jacques Tourneur
- Written by: DeWitt Bodeen
- Produced by: Val Lewton
- Starring: Simone Simon; Kent Smith; Tom Conway; Jane Randolph; Jack Holt
- Cinematography: Nicholas Musuraca
- Edited by: Mark Robson
- Music by: Roy Webb
- Color process: Black and white
- Production company: RKO Radio Pictures
- Distributed by: RKO Radio Pictures
- Release dates: December 5, 1942 (Rialto Theatre); December 25, 1942 (United States)
- Running time: 73 minutes
- Country: United States
- Language: English
- Budget: ≈ $135,000

Cat People is a 1942 American supernatural horror film directed by Jacques Tourneur and produced for RKO by Val Lewton. The film tells the story of Irena Dubrovna, a newly married Serbian fashion illustrator obsessed with the idea that she is descended from an ancient tribe of Cat People who metamorphose into black panthers when aroused. When her husband begins to show interest in one of his co-workers, Irena begins to stalk her. The film stars Simone Simon as Irena, and features Kent Smith, Tom Conway, Jane Randolph, and Jack Holt in supporting roles.

Production began in 1942, when Lewton was placed in charge of developing RKO's low-budget horror films. He brought together a team of filmmakers that he had worked with in the past, including Tourneur, editor Mark Robson and screenwriter DeWitt Bodeen. Cat People was the first film upon which the team worked. They were given the title by an RKO executive, who instructed them to develop a film from it. After researching various horror films and cat-related literature, Bodeen and Lewton developed the script with Lewton doing extensive uncredited work on the story. The film was shot at RKO's studios reusing sets from previous films such as The Magnificent Ambersons. During editing, Robson developed a technique later called The Lewton Bus, a jump scare that Lewton used in his subsequent films.

Cat People had its premiere at the Rialto Theatre in Manhattan on December 5, 1942, before having a wider release on December 25. Contemporary critics were tepid, though the film did well at the box office, being one of RKO's biggest hits of the season. Several horror films of the 1940s and 1950s were influenced by Cat People, either drawing on the film's shadowy visuals or containing a female character who fears that she possesses a hereditary trait that makes her transform into a monster. The film was followed by a sequel, The Curse of the Cat People, in 1944, and a remake, directed by Paul Schrader, was released in 1982. The film has become well known, though created as a B-movie, being selected by Library of Congress for preservation in the National Film Registry in 1993. Retrospective reviews of the original have been much more positive, with praise directed at the film's atmosphere and sophistication, with the critic Roger Ebert describing it and the other Val Lewton productions as landmark films of the 1940s.

== Plot ==
At the Central Park Zoo, Serbian-born fashion illustrator Irena Dubrovna makes sketches of a captive black panther. She catches the attention of marine engineer Oliver Reed, who strikes up a conversation. Irena invites him to her apartment for tea. At her apartment, Oliver is intrigued by a statue of a medieval warrior on horseback impaling a large cat with his sword. Irena informs Oliver that the figure is King John of Serbia and that the cat represents evil. According to legend, in medieval times, the Christian residents of her home village gradually turned to witchcraft after being enslaved by the Mameluks. When King John drove the Mameluks out and saw what the villagers had become, he had them killed. However, "the wisest and the most wicked" escaped into the mountains. Oliver is dismissive of the legend even though Irena clearly takes it seriously.

Oliver buys Irena a kitten, but upon meeting her, it hisses. Irena suggests they go to the pet shop to exchange it. When they enter the shop, the animals go wild in her presence, and Irena becomes uneasy. Irena gradually reveals to Oliver that she believes she is descended from the cat people of her village, and that she will transform into a panther if aroused to passion. Despite this, Oliver asks her to marry him, and she agrees. During the dinner after their wedding at a Serbian restaurant, a cat-like woman walks over and addresses Irena as moja sestra ("my sister").

Irena never consummates the marriage, fearful of the consequences. Oliver is patient with her, but eventually persuades her to see a psychiatrist, Dr. Louis Judd. Judd tries to convince her that her fears stem from childhood traumas. Meanwhile, Irena is unhappy to discover that Oliver has confided in his assistant, Alice Moore. Alice confesses to Oliver that she loves him. When Irena spots Oliver and Alice seated together at a restaurant, she follows Alice home. Just as Alice hears a menacing sound, a bus pulls up and she boards it. Soon afterward, a groundskeeper discovers several freshly killed sheep. The paw prints leading away turn into imprints of a woman's shoes. A disheveled Irena returns to her apartment; she is shown afterward weeping in the bathtub. Irena dreams of Dr. Judd dressed up as King John speaking of "the key". She later steals the key to the panther's cage at the zoo.

Irena, Oliver, and Alice visit a museum, and Irena is angered when the two virtually ignore her. That evening, when Alice decides to use the basement swimming pool of her apartment building, she is stalked by an animal. When Alice screams for help, Irena appears, turning on the lights, and says she is looking for Oliver. Alice later finds her bathrobe torn to shreds. After an appointment with Dr. Judd, Irena tells Oliver that she is no longer afraid, but Oliver tells her it is too late: he has realized that he loves Alice and intends to divorce Irena. Later at work, Oliver and Alice are cornered by a snarling animal. Oliver and Alice manage to get out of the building, but not before smelling Irena's perfume.

Alice calls Judd to warn him to stay away from Irena, but he hangs up when Irena arrives for her appointment with him. He kisses Irena passionately, causing her to transform into a panther and subsequently kill him, while he stabs her with his cane-sword. When Oliver and Alice arrive, Irena slips away and goes to the zoo. She opens the panther's cage with the stolen key and is struck down by the escaping panther, which is accidentally hit and killed by a car. Next to the cage, Oliver and Alice find Irena's dead body, transformed into a panther, lying on the ground. Oliver says, "She never lied to us", and leads Alice away.

== Cast ==
- Simone Simon as Irena Dubrovna
- Kent Smith as Oliver Reed
- Tom Conway as Dr. Louis Judd, a psychiatrist
- Jane Randolph as Alice Moore, Oliver's assistant
- Jack Holt as "Commodore" C. R. Cooper, Oliver's boss
- Alan Napier as "Doc" Carver, one of Oliver's co-workers (uncredited)
- Elizabeth Dunne as Mrs. Plunkett, the owner of the pet shop (uncredited)
- Elizabeth Russell as the "Cat Woman" at The Belgrade (voice dubbed by Simone Simon) (uncredited)
- Alec Craig as the zookeeper (uncredited)
- Dot Farley as Mrs. Agnew, the scrubwoman at Oliver's work (uncredited)
- Theresa Harris as Minnie, the waitress at Sally Lunn's (uncredited)
- Mary Halsey as Blondie, the front desk clerk at Alice's apartment building (uncredited)

== Production ==
=== Development ===
In March 1942, producer Val Lewton ended his working relationship with independent producer David O. Selznick to work for RKO Radio Pictures' Charles Koerner, becoming the head of a new unit created to develop B-movie horror feature films. Writing in 2009, the film critic Kim Newman compared the Lewton productions to RKO's own B-movie mystery series based on The Falcon, which were, unlike Lewton's productions, "churned out". The Lewton productions were modestly budgeted compared to Universal productions like The Wolf Man (1941), or Paramount productions like The Uninvited (1944), but had larger budgets than those of Producers Releasing Corporation (PRC) films like The Mad Monster (1942), or Monogram films like The Ape Man (1943). Cat People had a budget of around $135,000, which was significantly less than Universal spent on Frankenstein Meets the Wolf Man (1943), but more than the $97,000 that the poverty row studio PRC spent on The Devil Bat (1940).

Lewton selected most of the film's main crew, including director Jacques Tourneur and writer DeWitt Bodeen, who all worked on the treatment. These were people Lewton had connections with through their work with Selznick, as Tourneur had worked as part of the second unit teams for Selznick's production of A Tale of Two Cities (1935) and Bodeen had been a research assistant on what would become Jane Eyre (1943).

The germ of Cat People was Lewton's short story, "The Bagheeta," published in Weird Tales magazine (July 1930), about a legendary panther, a "half leopard and half woman . . . were-beast," that lives in the Caucasus mountains and plagues local farmers. Tourneur and Bodeen offered conflicting accounts as to how Cat People was conceived. Tourneur said that Lewton called him from RKO to direct the film after Koerner attended a party where it was suggested to him that he develop a film with the title Cat People. Tourneur added that Lewton was not sure what to do with the title and recalled Lewton deciding to not make a "cheap horror movie that the studio expected but something intelligent and in good taste". Bodeen's version involved him being hired by Lewton at RKO as a contract writer. He had previously watched British and American horror and suspense films that he felt were "typical of what we did not want to do". According to Bodeen, Koerner felt that werewolves, vampires and man-made monsters were over-exploited, and that "nobody has done much with cats". Bodeen added that Lewton was unhappy with the proposed title of Cat People and said, "if you want to get out now, I won't hold it against you."

Bodeen then began researching cat-related literature, including Ambrose Bierce's "The Eyes of the Panther" and Margaret Irwin's "Monsieur Seeks a Wife". Lewton decided to base the film on Algernon Blackwood's 1906 short story "Ancient Sorceries". Blackwood's story had a contemporary setting and involved a Medieval architecture French town inhabited by a group of devil-worshipping cat people. According to Bodeen, as the rights were about to be purchased, Lewton changed his mind at the last minute and told Bodeen that the film would be set in contemporary New York and involve a love triangle between a man, a foreign woman obsessed with abnormal fears, and a female office worker. According to Tourneur, he was not content with the period setting of "Ancient Sorceries", stating, "if you're going to have horror, the audience must be able to identify with the characters in order to be frightened." Lewton contributed heavily to the screenplay. During the writing process, Tourneur recalled driving by Lewton's home in the evening to find a light turned on where Lewton was still working on the screenplay. Bodeen described the screenplay as a "group project", saying Lewton had the original idea and he wrote the treatment and screenplay, collaborating with Tourneur and Lewton, and later the film's editor Mark Robson. Bodeen concluded that "Tourneur was entirely responsible for the style of Cat People, but if you read the screenplay you would find everything in the film was in the original script – and that's simply because it was a group project. Val, Tourneur, myself, Robson – we all talked about it and I put it down on paper." By May 1, 1942, Bodeen had a fifty-page treatment completed for Cat People.

=== Pre-production ===
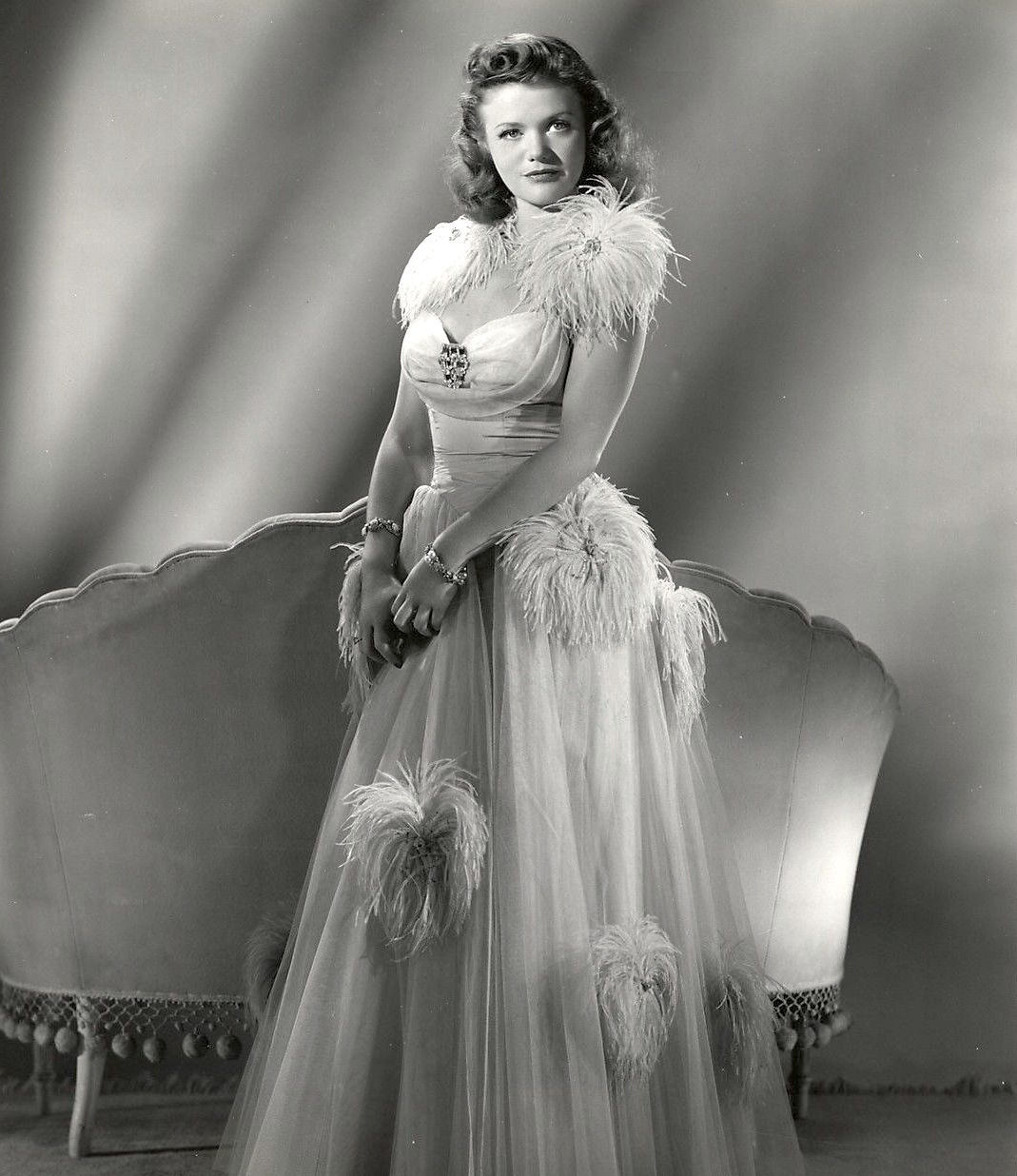
Simone Simon in a 1942 promotional photo for Cat People

Simone Simon was cast in the role of Irena Dubrovna by producer Lewton. Lewton commented that, "I'd like to have a girl with a little kitten face like Simone Simon, cute and soft and cuddly and seemingly not at all dangerous." He compared his decision to the casting of Kathleen Burke in Island of Lost Souls (1932), where she portrayed the Panther Woman, stating that any attempt at securing a wild, cat-like appearance in their casting would be disastrous. Simon, a star in her native France, had recently garnered fame in the United States for her role in The Devil and Daniel Webster (1941). Opposite Simon, Kent Smith was cast as Oliver Reed. Smith allegedly received the role after Lewton spotted him cycling across the studio lot.

The Los Angeles Times reported in August 1942 that Jack Holt had been cast in a supporting role, following Simon's casting as the lead. Tom Conway was cast as Dr. Judd, a psychiatrist who evaluates Irena and initially believes her fears to be delusional. Jane Randolph, then a young actress who had recently begun her film career, was cast as Alice Moore, a woman vying for Oliver's affections. Lewton had wanted Jennifer Jones to play Alice, but was prevented from casting her by Selznick, who had other plans for Jones. Among the rest of the crew was the composer of the score Roy Webb and cinematographer Nicholas Musuraca, who were seasoned veterans at RKO.

=== Filming ===
Principal photography commenced on July 28, 1942, at RKO's Gower Gulch studios in Hollywood. Tourneur recalled that he was nearly fired three days into shooting after executive producer Lew Ostrow saw the daily rushes, called Lewton and told him to fire the director. According to Tourneur, Lewton subsequently contacted Koerner, who viewed the raw unedited footage of the film the following day and expressed satisfaction with Tourneur's performance. Simon frequently clashed with co-stars as well as Tourneur during the shoot and displayed a significant temper. Randolph recalled that Simon frequently upstaged her during their scenes together, to the point that Tourneur confronted Simon: "He really bawled her out—in French. And she didn't like that either." Randolph also recalled Simon intentionally pouring coffee on one of her costumes in order to halt the production for the day. In a 1994 interview, Simon commented on her reputation in the United States: "I had a reputation of being temperamental – I never knew why – but this became part of my temperamental legend." Tourneur also clashed with higher-ups at RKO, recalling a later scene in the film, which featured a panther: "The front office made me put a cat in the drafting room scene: I had only intended to suggest the cat's presence by shadows." The director finished this scene by shooting it in a way that "you couldn't really be sure what you were seeing. That's the only way to do it."

Some of the film sets were re-used from previous productions, such as the hallway and staircase in Dubrovna's apartment, which were from The Magnificent Ambersons. Other sets were re-used from The Devil and Miss Jones. Additional photography took place at the Royal Palms Hotel in downtown Los Angeles, where the swimming pool sequence involving a character believing she is stalked by a panther was shot. The location was chosen by the production team due to its claustrophobic atmosphere. Bodeen also stated that the scene was inspired by his own experience of nearly drowning when swimming alone at night in a pool while Tourneur said that the scene was based on his own experience of swimming alone in a friend's pool while the friend's pet cheetah escaped and began pacing nearby. Filming was concluded on August 21. The film's final cost sheet was $141,659.88, which was $22,711.88 over-budget.

=== Post-production ===
Cat People's editor Mark Robson had previously worked on Orson Welles's The Magnificent Ambersons, which was a financial failure on its release. Robson felt that he was assigned to Lewton's horror film unit because RKO punished anyone who had worked with Welles. Cat People contains a stalking scene that ends with a jump scare. Such scenes were also featured in other Lewton horror productions, such as The Leopard Man and The Seventh Victim. Robson referred to these scenes as "the bus", which he described as an "editing device [he] created by accident". In Cat People, the scene involved Alice walking through a park alone at night as the film cuts to close ups of her face while her expression changes from chipper to distressed as she quickens her walking pace. Alice looks over her shoulder and turns to the sudden sound of a bus's air brakes. Robson stated that he "put a loud sound of air brakes on it so that it knocked viewers out of their seats. That became the 'bus' and we used it in every film."

On October 5, Constantin Bakaleinikoff conducted Roy Webb's score for Cat People at RKO's Stage 2A. Part of the score was influenced by Simon. Lewton found Simon singing a tune at RKO that went "doo-doo-baby-doo", subsequently taking her to see Webb, who developed the tune into the film's score. The score of the film, along with those of I Walked with a Zombie, The Seventh Victim, The Body Snatcher, and Bedlam, was re-recorded by The Slovak Radio Symphony Orchestra and released on compact disc in 1999. In his review of the album, Bruce Eder wrote for AllMusic noting that both Cat People and The Seventh Victim's scores "represent distinctly non-traditional suspense scores, built around memorable core motifs, dealing with their central characters' struggle with the forces of evil within and without".

Prior to its official release, the higher-up executives at RKO saw the film at a studio projection room and expressed disapproval. Early test screenings took place in October at the RKO Hill Street Theatre, a testing site for sneak previews, with the cast and crew in attendance. Bodeen recalled that the film opened up with a Disney cartoon about a kitten, which led to the audience meowing. The audience cat-called and meowed further at the films opening title screen, according to Bodeen. Upon seeing an early preview, Randolph commented that she thought she was "terrible" in the film, while Simon was terrified that people would laugh at her performance, specifically in the pool scene. Bodeen found that as the story progressed the audience calmed and became more involved in the film. By late October, Lewton and Tourneur were already shooting their next film together, I Walked with a Zombie.

== Release ==
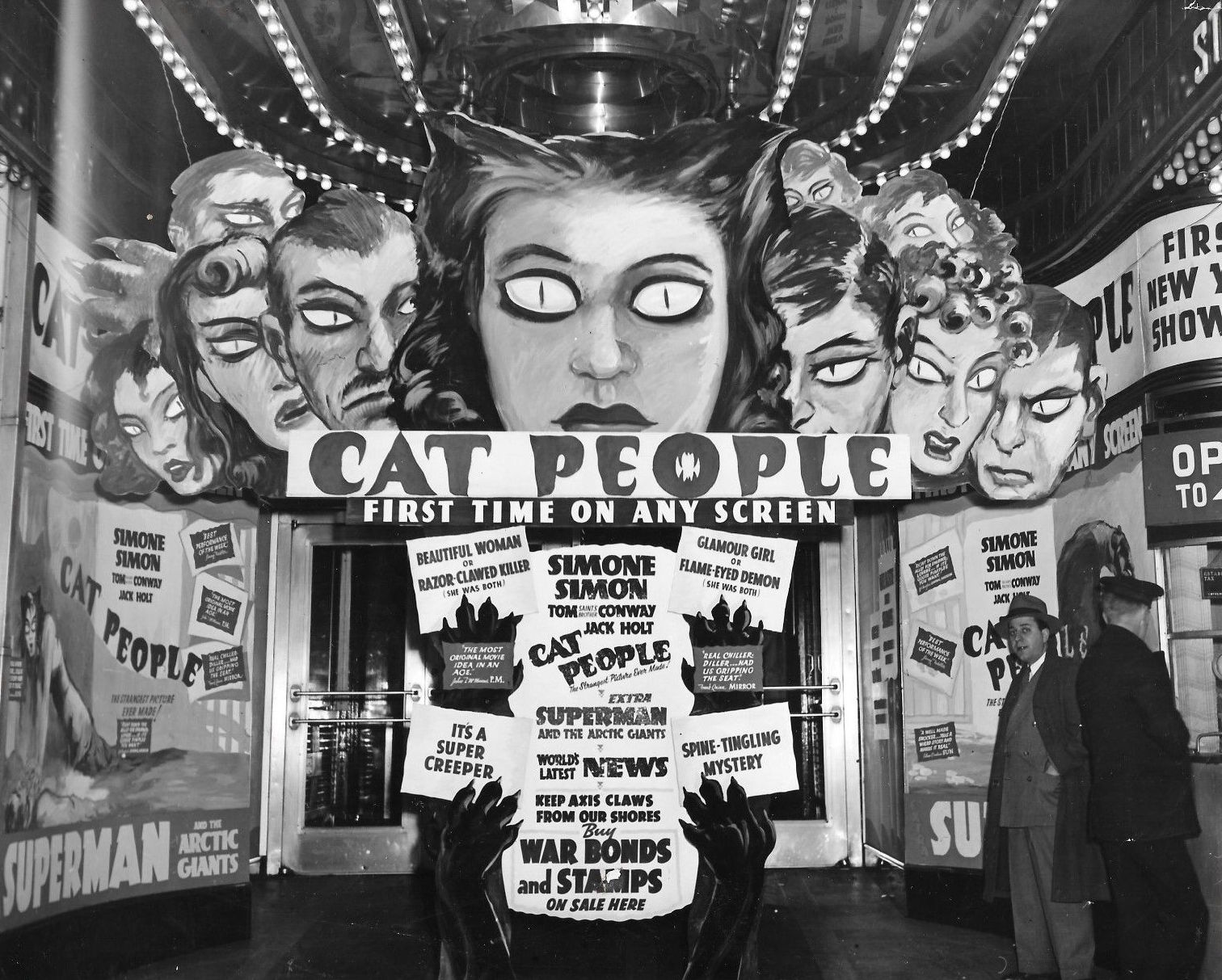
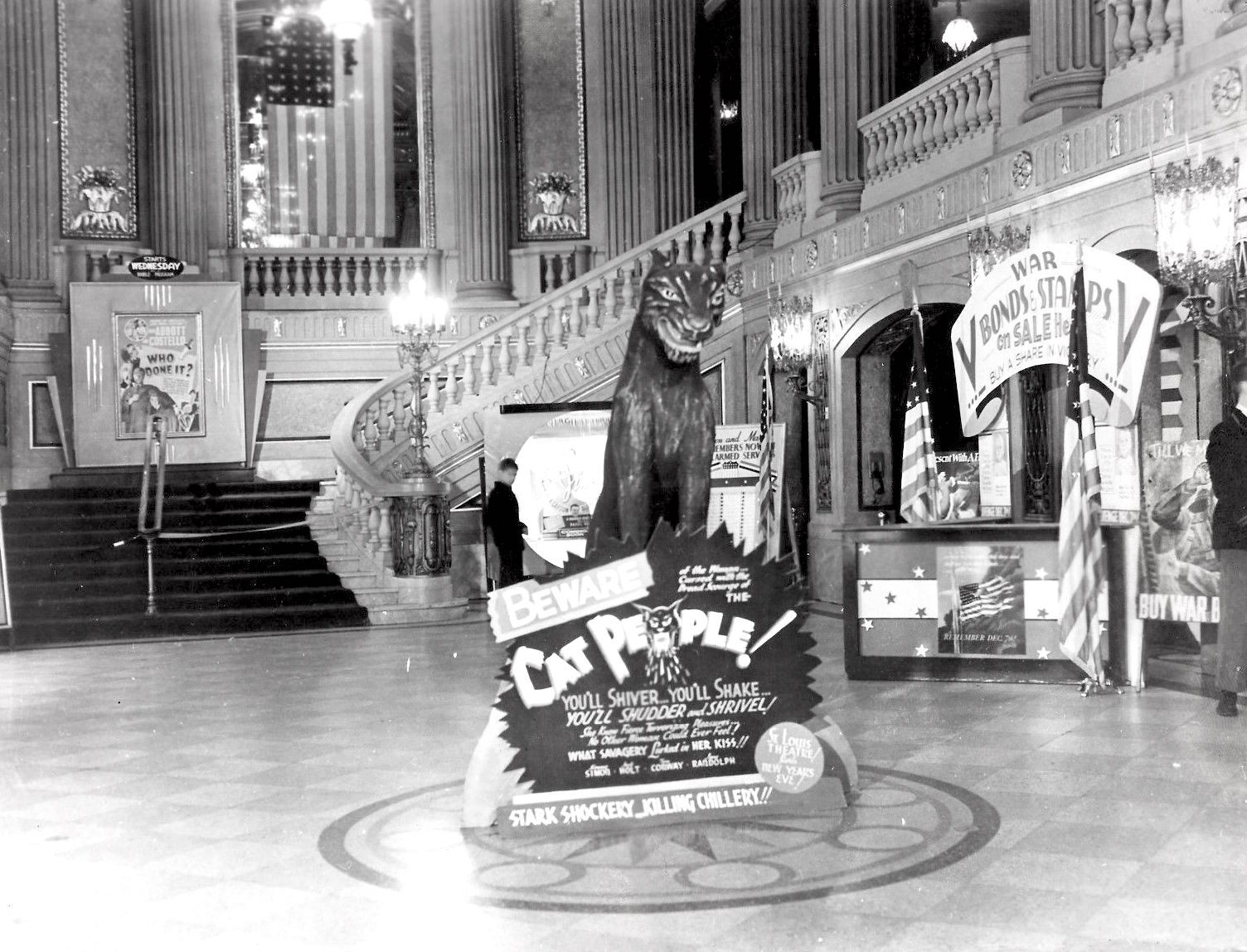
The Rialto Theatre in New York adorned with promotional materials for the film's premiere

Cat People had its premiere at the Rialto Theatre in Manhattan on December 5, 1942, and it was released regionally the following day in New York City. Its first two weeks at the Rialto Theatre, the film took in $17,000; in comparison, The Wolf Man grossed $19,500 at the same theatre in December 1941. The film received a wide release on December 25, distributed by RKO Radio Pictures. It had its Los Angeles premiere on January 14, 1943, at the Hawaii Theater, where it broke the attendance record. RKO reissued the film theatrically in 1952.

The film's box office receipts are disputed. Film historian Edmund Bansak has estimated the box office for Cat People at $4 million domestically and $4 million in foreign markets. Film historians Chris Fujiwara and Joel Siegel also put the domestic box office at $4 million. Variety estimated its rentals in 1943 as $1.2 million. Gregory Mank stated that RKO files report that domestic rentals were $360,000 and foreign rentals were $175,000, leading to a total of $535,000, and a profit of $183,000. Mank noted that rentals are not equivalent to gross revenue, and, assuming the revenue was split evenly between theaters and the studio, the film grossed over $1 million. He wrote that this was still "excellent business", comparing it to the profit of RKO's The Falcon's Brother, which had worldwide rentals of $361,000.

=== Home media ===
RKO Home Video released the film on home video in 1986 as part of their horror series. It was released on laserdisc by the Voyager Company as part of The Criterion Collection in 1995. This release contained an audio commentary by Bruce Eder, trailers for other Val Lewton titles and his filmography, and a section with production stills, lobby cards, and production photos.

In the United States, Cat People and its sequel, The Curse of the Cat People, were issued in 2005 as both a double feature DVD and as part of the Val Lewton Horror Collection DVD box set. In December 2016, Cat People was reissued on DVD and Blu-ray by The Criterion Collection. This Blu-ray was from a new digital transfer created at 2K resolution from a 35mm safety fine-grain master.

== Reception ==
=== Contemporary ===
At the time of its original release, the reviews for Cat People were mixed. Newman compiled the reviews after the film's premiere in New York, stating that The New York Times, The New York Herald Tribune, New York Sunday News, and the New York World-Telegram "all went thumbs down", while The New York Sun, New-York Mirror, New York Journal-American, and PM's reviews were "more positive, if not really enthusiastic". Wanda Hale of the New York Daily News was unimpressed by the film, writing that it "tries hard to be a melodrama ... but it doesn't try hard enough". Bosley Crowther of The New York Times described the film as a "labored and obvious attempt to induce shock", and said that its themes are explored "at tedious and graphically unproductive length". He commented on Simon's acting, stating that actresses who are trying to portray "[feline] temptations – in straight horror pictures, at least – should exercise their digits a bit more freely than does Simone Simon".

Newman referred to the reviews after the film opened in Los Angeles as "somewhat better". Variety stated that the film was "well-made on a moderate budget outlay" and relies upon "developments of surprises confined to psychology and mental reaction, rather than transformation to grotesque and marauding characters for visual impact on the audiences". The review went on to say that the script would be "hazy for the average audience in several instances, [but] carries sufficient punch in the melodramatic sequences to hold it together in good style", elaborating that Tourneur "does a fine job with a most difficult assignment". A reviewer at BoxOffice found the film "grim and unrelenting ... a dose of horror best suited to addicts past the curable stage", and noted that the film was "definitely not for children, young or old ... Potent stuff, straight from the psychopathic clinic". A critic writing in the Monthly Film Bulletin, a British publication, stated that Cat People was "a fantastic story, reasonably produced and directed", and complimented the photography and acting, noting that Simon "only partly succeeds in interpreting the part of Irena, but lighting and camera work and sound recording help to make her performance adequate".

=== Retrospective ===
Retrospective reviews of Cat People have been much more positive overall; with review aggregate site Rotten Tomatoes giving the film a 92% "Fresh" rating based on 72 reviews, with the consensus reading "Influential noir director Jacques Tourneau infused this sexy, moody horror film with some sly commentary about the psychology and the taboos of desire." Likewise on Metacritic, the film has a weighted average score of 85 out of 100 based on 16 critics, indicating "universal acclaim".

Kim Newman praised the film, noting that it was the first major supernatural horror film with a contemporary, urban, American setting and "normal people, engaged in normal occupations" as leading characters, and concluded that Cat People was a progenitor of films like Rosemary's Baby. He wrote that, through numerous viewings of the film, he discovered "new aspect[s], some unnoticed detail carefully crafted [...] I would happily rewatch it this evening which may be the highest praise I can give any film". In his book on Tourneur, Fujiwara declared that Cat People was the "master text" of Tourneur's career, stating that most of his later films have some connection with Cat People, specifically The Leopard Man and Night of the Demon, but also Experiment Perilous, Out of the Past, Nightfall, and Circle of Danger. Fujiwara concluded that Cat People is, "with all its flaws, a perfect film", and added that even its flaws "have become classic", dismissing the "careful", "tepid", "strained", and "uneven" qualities that some critics have complained about. He also stated that Cat People "is still contagious; the viewer can still share the surprise and pleasure the film evoked in audiences who discovered this unheralded B horror film on its initial release". Critic Roger Ebert included Cat People in his list of "Great Movies" in 2006. He remarked that the film would work for contemporary audiences depending on their tastes, stating that it is "frightening in an eerie, mysterious way that was hard to define" with "an undertone of sexual danger that was more ominous because it was never acted upon". Ebert also praised the filmmakers, writing that Tourneur and Musuraca were "masters of light and shadow", and called the films Lewton produced in the 1940s "landmark[s] in American movie history". In 1993, the Library of Congress deemed Cat People "culturally, historically, or aesthetically significant" and selected it for preservation in the National Film Registry.

Less enthusiastic reviews came from Charles Higam and Joel Greenberg, who wrote that the film now appeared "so understated that much of its intended effect is dissipated [...] its total impression is distinctly tepid". Joel E. Siegel spoke about the film in his book on Lewton, stating it was "seriously weakened by passages of lumpy, strained dialogue, uncertain performance and uneven pacing". Richard Combs of the Monthly Film Bulletin compared the film unfavorably to other Lewton productions, stating that "it is perhaps easier to prefer the more mellow, less heavily fingered fantasy of Curse of the Cat People, and even the reconciled ambitions of The Ghost Ship". In his 1995 book on Lewton, Edmund G. Bansak found that Cat People "may have lost some of its edge over the years and what remains may be a bit tarnished, but it is infinitely better than Paul Schrader's 1982 remake". Tourneur himself held varying opinions about the film, once saying that it was "very childish but audiences in those days were more naive than they are today [...] but there are some very good things in it". On another occasion, he suggested that World War II-era audiences "all love war and love to be frightened, and in wartime people had money from plants, money to burn, and they loved that kind of film". Critic Ken Hanke remarked: "It isn't because the [Lewton films] are unsuccessful in themselves. It's simply that they threw the baby out with the bathwater by rejecting everything of the Universal product. Moreover, the films are a bit too trés snob and condescending for genre fans to feel comfortable about them." Fujiwara opinionated Cat People's retrospective critical status by stating that it "is so famous that it has, inevitably, suffered a backlash, and now it might even be called underrated". The critical reception to Simon's acting has historically been mixed. Siegel critiqued her acting, stating that her range was "too narrow for the film's more dramatic moments, a problem heightened by her difficulties with American pronunciation". Tourneur also stated that he was not happy with Simon's acting. On the other hand, Fujiwara wrote that, although "not delicately nuanced", Simon's performance "is effective in its mixture of narcissism and hesitant uncertainty". Newman described Simon's performance as "remarkably affecting, strange accent and all", adding that "there's a sense of life in her performance that makes Cat People, like most great monster movies, as much a tragedy as a melodrama".

In Monsters in the Closet, the film theorist Harry Benshoff argues that the films of Val Lewton such as Cat People reflected "a growing awareness of homosexuality, homosexual communities, and the dynamics of homosexual oppression as it was played out in society and the military" during that era, which led to a more nuanced depiction of monsters in films of that era.

== Legacy ==
=== Related films ===
Discussing the history of horror films, Newman stated that, if a horror film in the 1940s was financially successful, it was likely to become a franchise. Cat People was followed by The Curse of the Cat People, the first feature film directed by Robert Wise. Simon returned as star. Elizabeth Russell appeared again, but in a different role, as Barbara Farren. Lewton unsuccessfully attempted to have the title of The Curse of the Cat People, which had little to do with the original, changed to Amy and Her Friend.

The Seventh Victim is described by Newman as being "an unacknowledged spin-off" of Cat People, as it also features Tom Conway playing Dr. Judd, as well as another haunted woman eager to embrace death. In the film, Judd recalls that he once knew a mysterious woman who was in fact a "raving lunatic", even though Judd's character died in Cat People, making the relationship between the two fictional narratives incoherent. In memos and early drafts of the screenplay of The Seventh Victim, Conway's character was referred to as "Mr. Siegfried", leading film scholars to believe that the character's name was changed to create continuity between the two films and capitalize on Cat People's success.

=== Remakes ===
British producer Milton Subotsky bought the rights to Cat People from RKO with plans to develop a remake. Subotsky later passed the property to Universal, which initially planned to have Roger Vadim direct. Three drafts of the screenplay were developed, the first two written by Bob Clark and the final version written by Alan Ormsby. According to Ormsby, Vadim was very concerned that the film would appear sexist, as the woman who was sexually intense had to be destroyed, so he created a male character who has the same problem.

In the early 1980s, Universal Pictures hired Paul Schrader to direct the remake of Cat People. The remake was announced and began shooting in 1981. According to cinematographer John Bailey, Schrader paid homage to the stalking scene in the original with a scene featuring Annette O'Toole's character jogging through a park as she appears to be stalked. Bailey and Schrader also remade the swimming pool scene, with Bailey recalling that they carefully studied the original scene, taking note of how the shadows reflected against the pool, and stating that this sequence was the most similar part of the remake to the original film because "we didn't think we could do it any better". The remake was released in April 1982 to mixed reviews.

In March 1999, a second remake was announced as a co-production between Universal Pictures and Overbrook Entertainment. Written by Rafael Moreu, it was written to take place in present day New York.

=== Influence ===
A number of contemporary films were influenced by Cat People, such as Columbia Pictures' Cry of the Werewolf (1944), which Newman described as combining the "subtle Lewton approach" with elements from Universal's The Wolf Man, like a plot that involves a gypsy curse. Numerous films have borrowed plot or character elements from Cat People, particularly by having a female character who fears she has inherited the tendency to turn into a monster, or attempted to replicate the shadowy visual style of Tourneur and Musuraca, among them Jungle Woman (1944), The Soul of a Monster (1944), The Woman Who Came Back (1945), She-Wolf of London (1946), The Catman of Paris (1946), The Cat Creeps (1946), The Creeper (1948), Cult of the Cobra (1955), The She-Creature (1956), and Daughter of Dr. Jekyll (1957).

Director Curtis Harrington made two films as tributes to Lewton's work. The first was Night Tide (1961), which reworked the plot of Cat People into a story about a sideshow performer who dresses as a mermaid and is concerned she actually is a siren. The second was the television film The Cat Creature (1973), which featured Kent Smith in the cast and also paid tribute Universal's horror films.

== See also ==
- List of cult films
