= Irena Dubrovna =

Fictional werecat

Irena Dubrovna is a fictional werecat created by screenwriters DeWitt Bodeen and Val Lewton and portrayed by Simone Simon in the 1942 film Cat People and its 1944 sequel The Curse of the Cat People.

== Fictional biography ==
Serbian-born Irena Dubrovna is a fashion illustrator. She meets naval construction designer Oliver Reed at Central Park Zoo and they soon fall in love and are married. However, Irena is haunted by an ancient curse of her home village that claims "cat women" cannot be touched by a man otherwise they will transform into a panther and kill their partner, thus the couple does not consummate their marriage. Irena is sent for treatment with the psychiatrist Dr. Louis Judd, while Oliver looks for "consolation" with his colleague Alice Moore. When Irena sees that she is losing Oliver to Alice, she becomes jealous and hateful. She is ultimately killed by a panther that she releases from the zoo.

Irena later returns as a ghost and becomes a friend to Reed's daughter Amy.

== Legacy ==
The 1982 remake of Cat People centres another werecat named Irena but she is otherwise a very different character.

The DC Comics anti-hero Catwoman occasionally uses the name Irene Dubrovna as an alias.
