= Roy Webb =

American film music composer (1888–1982)

Royden Denslow Webb (October 3, 1888 – December 10, 1982) was an American film music composer. A co-founder and charter member of ASCAP, he has hundreds of film music credits to his name, mainly with RKO Pictures. He is best known for composing film noir and horror film scores, in particular for the films of Val Lewton.

== Biography ==
Born in Manhattan, New York, Webb orchestrated and conducted for the Broadway stage before moving to Hollywood in the late 1920s to work as music director for Radio Pictures, later RKO Pictures. He remained at RKO until 1955, then worked freelance for several years, scoring several episodes of Wagon Train. Webb is credited as composer or arranger on more than 200 films, and received Academy Award nominations for Quality Street (1937), My Favorite Wife (1940), I Married a Witch (1942), Joan of Paris (1942), The Fallen Sparrow (1943), The Fighting Seabees (1944), and The Enchanted Cottage (1945). His piano concerto from The Enchanted Cottage was performed by the Los Angeles Philharmonic Orchestra, conducted by Constantin Bakaleinikoff, in concert at the Hollywood Bowl in 1945. In 1961, a house fire destroyed Webb's manuscripts, including film scores and unpublished concert music, after which he ceased composing. Musicologist Christopher Palmer worked with Webb to reconstruct many of the latter's scores.

An alumnus of Columbia University, Webb wrote the fight song "Roar, Lion, Roar" for his alma mater in 1925. He received his first screen credit for Alice Adams (1935). He made uncredited contributions to two famous films by Orson Welles. Musical cues by Webb were used in the newsreel montage of Charles Foster Kane's life in Citizen Kane (1941). After The Magnificent Ambersons (1942) was re-edited, several of Webb's cues replaced those by Bernard Herrmann. Webb also composed cues (uncredited) for This is Cinerama (1952), the first Cinerama production.

Webb died in 1982 from a heart attack. He was 94.

The Christopher Palmer Collection of Roy Webb Scores is held at Syracuse University.

== Selected filmography ==
- Our Betters (1933) (uncredited)
- Down to Their Last Yacht (1934) (uncredited)
- Sylvia Scarlett (1935) (uncredited)
- Alice Adams (1935)
- Becky Sharp (1935)
- Enchanted April (1935)
- Stage Door (1937)
- The Woman I Love (1937)
- Quality Street (1937)
- Room Service (1938)
- Bringing Up Baby (1938)
- Arizona Legion (1939)
- The Great Man Votes (1939)
- In Name Only (1939)
- Abe Lincoln in Illinois (1940)
- My Favorite Wife (1940)
- Curtain Call (1940)
- Stranger on the Third Floor (1940)
- Citizen Kane (1941) (additional music and arrangements, uncredited)
- Mr. and Mrs. Smith (1941)
- I Married a Witch (1942)
- Joan of Paris (1942)
- The Magnificent Ambersons (1942) (additional music, uncredited)
- The Big Street (1942)
- Cat People (1942)
- Hitler's Children (1943)
- The Seventh Victim (1943)
- Journey into Fear (1943)
- I Walked with a Zombie (1943)
- The Leopard Man (1943)
- The Fallen Sparrow (1943)
- The Falcon in Danger (1943)
- Gangway for Tomorrow (1943)
- The Falcon Out West (1944)
- Experiment Perilous (1944)
- Tall in the Saddle (1944)
- The Fighting Seabees (1944)
- The Curse of the Cat People (1944)
- Murder, My Sweet (1944)
- Bride by Mistake (1944)
- The Seventh Cross (1944)
- The Enchanted Cottage (1945)
- The Body Snatcher (1945)
- Back to Bataan (1945)
- Two O'Clock Courage (1945)
- The Spiral Staircase (1945)
- Notorious (1946)
- The Locket (1946)
- Bedlam (1946)
- Out of the Past (1947)
- They Won't Believe Me (1947)
- I Remember Mama (1948)
- Holiday Affair (1949)
- Mighty Joe Young (1949)
- The Window (1949)
- Easy Living (1949)
- My Friend Irma (1949)
- The Secret Fury (1950)
- The White Tower (1950)
- Vendetta (1950)
- Where Danger Lives (1950)
- Gambling House (1951)
- Flying Leathernecks (1951)
- Fixed Bayonets (1951)
- Sealed Cargo (1951)
- Operation Secret (1952)
- This is Cinerama (uncredited) (1952)
- Second Chance (1953)
- Split Second (1953)
- Houdini (1953)
- The Raid (1954)
- Dangerous Mission (1954)
- Track of the Cat (1954)
- Blood Alley (1955)
- Marty (1955)
- The Sea Chase (1955)
- Our Miss Brooks (1956)
- The Search for Bridey Murphy (1956)
- The Girl He Left Behind (1956)
- The River Changes (1956)
- Top Secret Affair (1957)
- Shoot-out at Medicine Bend (1957)
- Teacher's Pet (1958)
