= Simone Simon =

French actress (1911–2005)

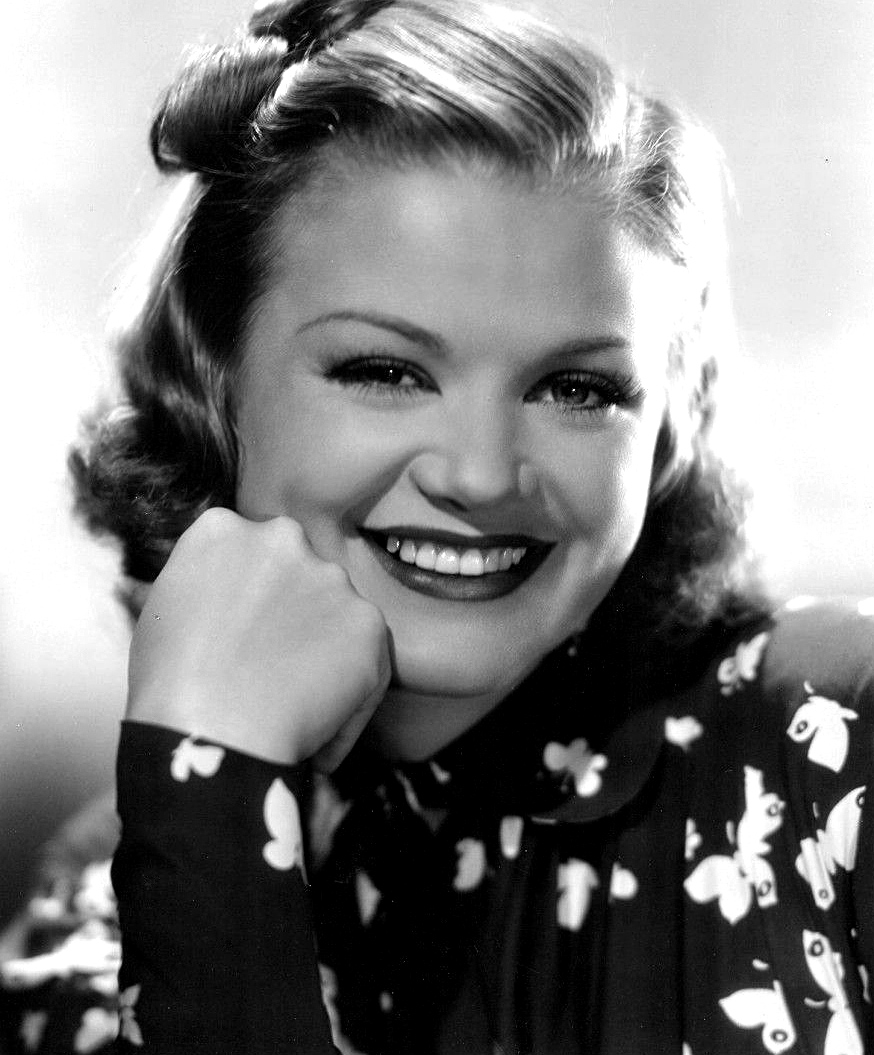
- Simon in Love and Hisses (1937)
- Born: Simone Thérèse Fernande Simon; 23 April 1911; Marseille, France
- Died: 22 February 2005 (aged 93); Paris, France
- Occupation: Actress
- Years active: 1931–1973

Simone Thérèse Fernande Simon (23 April 1911 – 22 February 2005) was a French film actress who began her film career in 1931. She is perhaps best remembered for her role in the American horror film Cat People and its sequel The Curse of the Cat People.

== Early life ==
Born in Marseille, France, she was the daughter of Henri Louis Firmin Clair Simon, a French engineer and airplane pilot, and Erma Maria Domenica Giorcelli, an Italian housewife. Before settling and growing up in Marseille, Simon lived in Madagascar, Budapest, Turin, and Berlin. She went to Paris in 1931 and worked briefly as a singer, model, and fashion designer. She also at one point wanted to become a sculptor.

Simon worked chiefly for the Théâtre des Bouffes Parisiens and then managed to get more serious work with Sacha Guitry in the musical comedy Ô mon bel inconnu.

== Career ==
After being spotted in a restaurant in June 1931, Simon was offered a film contract by director Victor Tourjansky, which ended her plans to become a fashion designer. She made her screen debut in Le chanteur inconnu (The Unknown Singer, 1931), and quickly established herself as one of the country's most successful film actresses. Simon later told a reporter that she had no acting experience when making her first screen test for The Unknown Singer. In 1932, she was given more important roles and she rose to fame after starring in Marc Allégret's Lac aux dames (Lake of Ladies, 1934), which was in her own opinion her first serious role since The Unknown Singer. In later interviews, Simon expressed her gratitude towards Allégret, feeling that he was responsible for her glory.

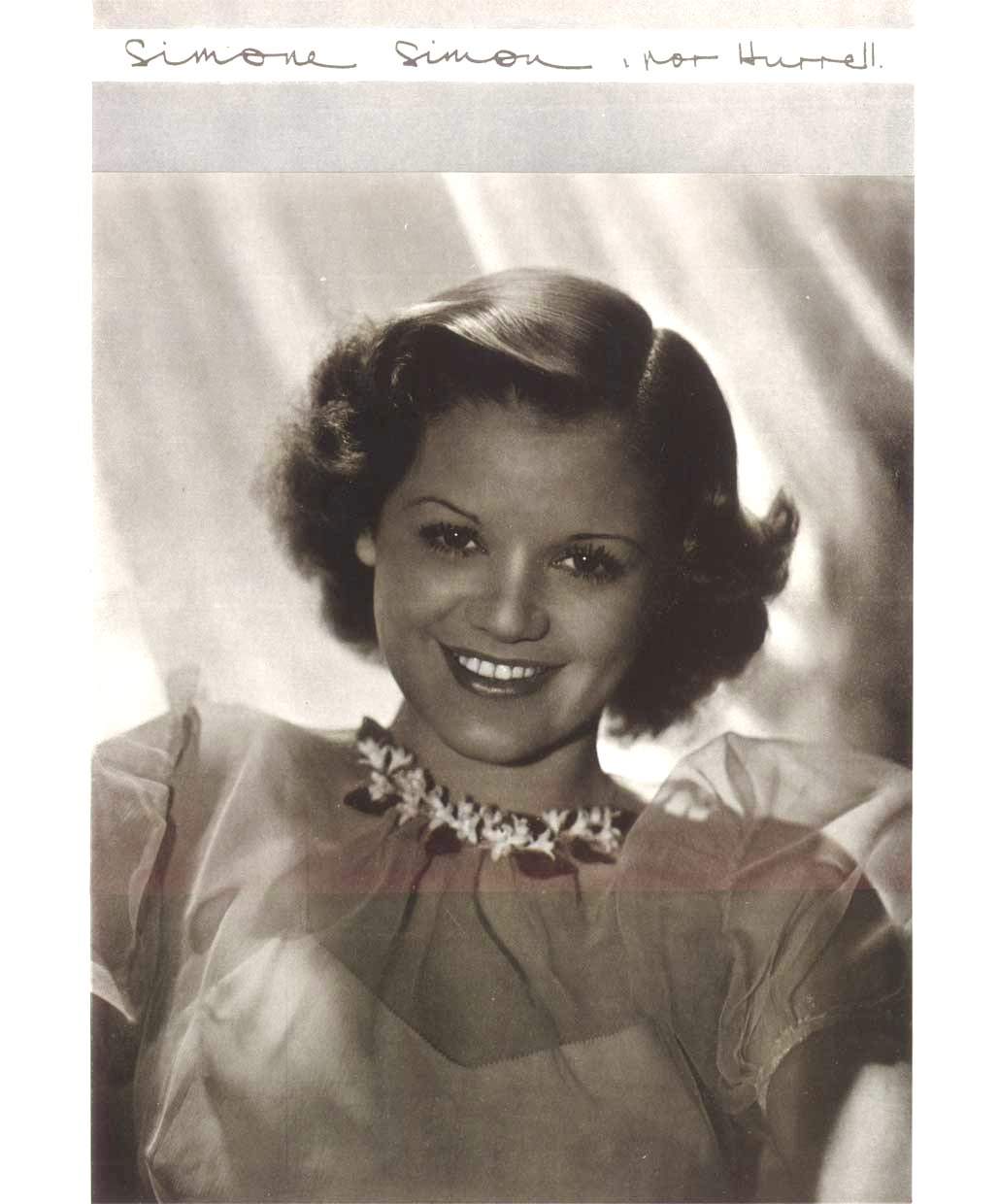
Simon on the advertisement of an Argentine magazine in the wedding dress from the 1937 remake of Seventh Heaven

After seeing her in Lake of Ladies, Darryl F. Zanuck brought her to Hollywood in August 1935 with a widespread publicity campaign. Before accepting an American contract, Simon completed two more films for Allégret, Les yeux noirs (Black Eyes, 1935) and Les beaux jours (1935). It was usual for foreign actresses to receive months of preparation before working, but Simon was given only a few weeks of English lessons before she was told to report on set. Meanwhile, the studio had trouble finding her a suitable role. She was scheduled to make her American film debut in A Message to Garcia (1936), playing a Spanish girl, but was replaced by Rita Hayworth. In mid-1935, she was cast in the female lead in Under Two Flags (1936), but was discharged during production.

Although it was reported that she withdrew due to illness, it was later revealed that Zanuck fired her after twelve days of shooting because of her temperamental behavior, which displeased the film's director Frank Lloyd. Simon herself claimed in a 1936 interview that she fell ill after weeks of tests and rehearsing for the film. She admitted, though, that in the early stage of production she was temperamental, insisting that she was inspired to behave that way after a conversation with Marlene Dietrich, who told her that "a star is only as important as she makes herself out to be." She dismissed any further claims of her being rude or difficult to work with, explaining to the press that she was initially not used to the American lifestyle, which was in her view more extroverted than the French way of living. Her poor health caused her to be hospitalized, during which she became convinced to give up her American contract.

Shortly after she had decided to return to France, the studio assigned her to a third billing role in Girls' Dormitory (1936). Simon was attracted to the story and saw "great possibilities" in her character. Reportedly, she again showed a temperament, which led to difficulties with Ruth Chatterton, the film's star, who felt that Simon was receiving more attention. Simon confessed that she was nervous during production, because studio executives were closely watching her every step. Although thought to be one of the highlights of the year, Girls' Dormitory was soon forgotten by the public, making Simon's American film debut less than impressive. Nonetheless, Simon was hailed a sensation and critics applauded her performance. Furthermore, magazines reported that it brought the actress overnight fame. Shortly after the film's release she was cast in White Hunter, a B movie that would reunite her with producer Irving Cummings. During filming, she was again stricken by flu, and she ultimately had to be replaced by actress June Lang.

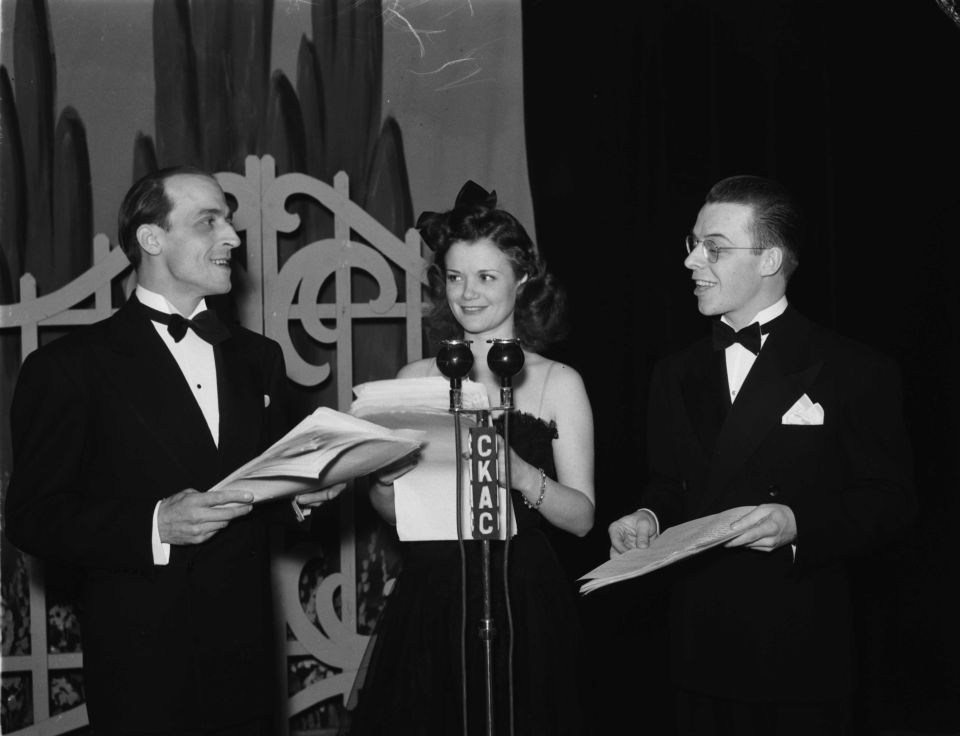
Simon performing in Montreal in 1942

Instead, the studio rushed her in the romantic comedy Ladies in Love (1936), which was filmed in mid-1936. She shared the female lead with Janet Gaynor, Loretta Young and Constance Bennett, some of whom objected to the large number of scenes that Simon was getting. It was a heavyweight lineup in which Simon's role left her little chance to compete effectively. Trying to avoid quarrels, she hired an assistant to prevent her from making headlines with her behavior. Despite a big build-up, which included a weekly salary even though her first American film was released more than a year after her arrival in the country, Simon's films for 20th Century Fox were only moderately successful. Among others, she was cast in the Janet Gaynor role in the 1937 remake of the silent classic Seventh Heaven (1927), which co-starred James Stewart and flopped. Afterwards, she was cast in Danger – Love at Work (1937), but due to her heavy French accent she had to be replaced by Ann Sothern. Failing in finding her appropriate roles, the studio allowed her to go on an eight-week vacation to France, and following her return in June 1937, she was assigned to Suez (1938), but the project was shelved and she was eventually replaced.

In the late 1930s, Simon returned to France, dissatisfied with the development of her American film career and the backfiring of its related publicity. There, she appeared in the Jean Renoir film La Bête Humaine (The Human Beast) in 1938. With the outbreak of World War II, she returned to Hollywood and worked for RKO Radio Pictures where she achieved her greatest successes in English language cinema with The Devil and Daniel Webster (1941), Cat People (1942) and The Curse of the Cat People (1944); the latter two formed part of the horror film series produced by Val Lewton. At the time, due to her relative obscurity in the United States, Simon generated a series of apocryphal rumours about her origins, such as that she was the love child of Marion Davies and William Randolph Hearst, and that she had been a Paramount stock player from Salem, Oregon. These films did not lead to greater success and she languished in mediocre films until the end of the war.

She returned to France to act, and appeared in La Ronde (Roundabout, 1950), Olivia and Le Plaisir. Her film roles were few after this and she made her final film appearance in 1973.

== Personal life and death ==
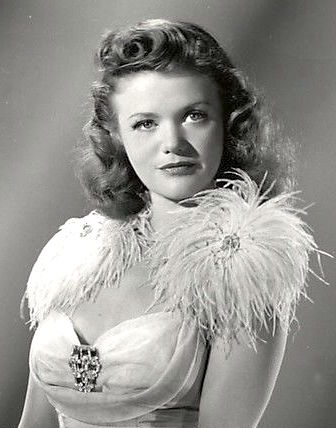
Cat People promotional photo taken on 10 August 1942

Simon never married. She was at one time in a relationship with World War II double agent Duško Popov, codenamed "Tricycle", a notorious womaniser. This relationship led to her being placed under covert surveillance by the FBI during the filming of Cat People. Simon had loaned Popov £10,000 in 1942 shortly before he left the country, likely her payment for the film (value circa £600,000 in 2025). They broke up in 1943 with him not repaying the money.

It was alleged by Simon's secretary that she gave a gold key to her boudoir to any man she was interested in, including George Gershwin. The film historian, Greg Mank, reports in his audio commentary for the DVD of Cat People, that the secretary was then on trial for extorting money from her employer, and her word on this matter cannot be taken at face value (the secretary was later convicted, and the terms of her probation required that she never speak of the "gold key" scandal again). In the 1950s, Simon was romantically involved with the French banker and racehorse owner–breeder Alec Weisweiller whose wife Francine was one of Jean Cocteau's patrons.

Simon died in Paris, France, on 22 February 2005 from natural causes after having gone blind. A few days later, French Minister of Culture Renaud Donnedieu de Vabres issued a statement in which he extolled Simon's "charm, her irresistible smile... With Simone Simon's passing, we have lost one of the most seductive and most brilliant stars of the French cinema of the first half of the 20th century." Simon was buried in the Cimetière du Château-Gombert with a simple headstone which merely commemorates her name together with her dates of birth and death.

The French playwright Pierre Barillet, who knew Simon in real life, authored the biography La Féline in 2013. The book has not yet been translated into English.

== Filmography ==
Film
Year	Title	Role	Notes
1931	Durand Versus Durand	Eliane	
1931	Mam'zelle Nitouche		Uncredited
1931	The Unknown Singer	Pierette	Original title: Le chanteur inconnu
1931	On opère sans douleur		
1932	The Chocolate Girl	Julie	Original title: La petite chocolatière
1932	A Son from America	Maryse	Original title: Un fils d'Amérique
1932	King of the Hotel	Victoire	Original title: Le roi des palaces
1932	To Live Happily	Jacqueline	Original title: Pour vivre heureux
1933	The Sad Sack	Lily	Original title: Tire au flanc
1933	Mind the Paint	Amélie Gadarin	Original title: Prenez garde à la peinture
1933	The Star of Valencia	Rita	
1933	Le Voleur		
1934	Lake of Ladies	Puck	
1935	Dark Eyes	Tania	Original title: Les yeux noirs
1935	Beautiful Days	Sylvie	
1936	Girls' Dormitory	Marie Claudel	
1936	Ladies in Love	Marie Armand	
1937	Seventh Heaven	Diane	
1937	Love and Hisses	Yvett Guerin	
1938	Josette	Renee LeBlanc	
1938	La Bête Humaine	Séverine Roubaud	Alternative title: The Human Beast; Alternative title: Judas Was a Woman
1940	Love Cavalcade	Juliette	Original title: Cavalcade d'amour
1941	The Devil and Daniel Webster	Belle	Alternative title: All That Money Can Buy
1942	Cat People	Irena Dubrovna Reed	
1943	Tahiti Honey	Suzette 'Susie" Durand	
1944	The Curse of the Cat People	Irena Reed	
1944	Johnny Doesn't Live Here Any More	Kathie Aumont	Alternative title: And So They Were Married
1944	Mademoiselle Fifi	Elizabeth Bousset – A Little Laundress	Alternative title: Guy de Maupassant's Mademoiselle Fifi
1946	Pétrus	Migo	
1947	Temptation Harbour	Camelia	Alternative title: Temptation Harbor
1950	Women Without Names	Yvonne Dubois	Original title: Donne senza nome
1950	La Ronde	Marie, the housemaid	
1951	Olivia	Mlle. Cara	Alternative title: The Pit of Loneliness
1952	Le Plaisir	Joséphine – le modèle	Alternative title: House of Pleasure (segment "Le Modèle")
1954	The Three Thieves	Doris Ornano	
1954	A Double Life	Françoise Dunoyer	Original title: Das zweite Leben
1956	The Extra Day	Michele Blanchard	
1973	The Woman in Blue	La dame de Meudon	Original title: La femme en bleu (final film role)

== Radio appearances ==
Year	Program	Episode/source
1945	The Adventures of the Thin Man	"The Case of the Homicidal Husband"
1945	Inner Sanctum	"The Black Art"
