= Screened Out =

LGBT Film Series

Screened Out: Gay Images in Film was a June 2007 film festival broadcast on Turner Classic Movies. The festival, based on the book Screened Out: Playing Gay in Hollywood by Richard Barrios, examined the history of homosexual images in American cinema, from 1912 to 1970. Screened Out's June schedule coincided with Gay and Lesbian Pride Month.

The series focused not just on films in which homosexual themes or characters were obvious but on those which, because of the Motion Picture Production Code (MPCC), were concealed or "coded". The MPCC, introduced in 1934 was very strict, and meant that for 20 years, even married couples had to be pictured sleeping in twin beds, and any mention of homosexuality was forbidden.

Screened Out sought out films that were rarely seen and not necessarily included in TCM's film library. The Library of Congress served as the source for one film, 1912's Algie the Miner.

== Films ==
Each night of the festival spotlighted a different Hollywood era or theme.

=== The early years ===
- Algie the Miner
- The Monster
- Exit Smiling
- The Broadway Melody
- Way Out West
- The Office Wife
- Stage Mother

=== Gays Before the Code ===
- The Sign of the Cross
- Our Betters
- Double Harness
- Queen Christina
- Wonder Bar
- The Sport Parade

=== Men and Women Behind Bars ===
- Hell's Highway (1932)
- Ladies They Talk About
- Caged
- So Young, So Bad
- The Strange One
- Women's Prison

=== The Dark Side: Film Noir & Crime ===
- The Big Combo
- Suddenly, Last Summer
- Reflections in a Golden Eye
- Gilda
- The Maltese Falcon

=== Horror Films ===
- The Uninvited
- The Picture of Dorian Gray
- Voodoo Island
- The Haunting
- The Seventh Victim

=== Comedies ===
- Manhattan Parade
- Sylvia Scarlett
- Turnabout
- That Touch of Mink
- The Producers
- Designing Woman

=== Code Busters ===
- Tea and Sympathy
- Advise and Consent
- The Children's Hour
- Walk on the Wild Side
- Victim

=== Out and Open ===
- Staircase
- The Fox
- The Boys in the Band
- The Killing of Sister George
