= Cat People (1982 film) =

1982 film by Paul Schrader

- Theatrical release poster
- Directed by: Paul Schrader
- Screenplay by: Alan Ormsby
- Based on: Cat People (1942) by DeWitt Bodeen
- Produced by: Charles Fries
- Starring: Nastassja Kinski; Malcolm McDowell; John Heard; Annette O'Toole
- Cinematography: John Bailey
- Edited by: Jacqueline Cambas
- Music by: Giorgio Moroder
- Production company: RKO Pictures
- Distributed by: Universal Pictures
- Release date: April 2, 1982
- Running time: 118 minutes
- Country: United States
- Language: English
- Budget: $12.5 million
- Box office: $21 million

Cat People is a 1982 American supernatural horror film directed by Paul Schrader and starring Nastassja Kinski, Malcolm McDowell, John Heard, and Annette O'Toole. Its plot follows a young woman who, upon reuniting with her brother, learns she has descended from werecats. It is a remake of the 1942 film of the same name, and was produced by RKO Radio Pictures, the same studio that produced the original film.

Giorgio Moroder composed the film's score (the second Schrader film to be scored by Moroder, after American Gigolo), including the theme song, which features lyrics and vocals by David Bowie. Jerry Bruckheimer served as an executive producer.

== Plot ==
In an undisclosed, primitive human settlement, a sacrificial maiden is tied to a tree. A black panther approaches and rests its paws on her. Another girl with feline features approaches a similar big cat in a cave, without incurring its attack.

In the present, Irena Gallier travels to New Orleans from Canada to reconnect with her brother Paul. Irena was raised in foster care after they were orphaned. Paul, who spent his childhood in psych wards, is now involved in a church and lives with his Creole housekeeper Female (pronounced "Fee-molly").

That night, a prostitute named Ruthie walks into a fleabag motel to meet a john, but instead finds a black panther that mauls her foot. The police and zoologists Oliver, Alice and Joe capture the panther. Meanwhile, Irena wakes to find Paul missing. Female deduces he went to the mission and urges Irena to enjoy New Orleans on her own.

Irena visits the zoo, is drawn to the newly captured panther and stays after closing hours. She is discovered by Oliver, the zoo's curator, who takes her to dinner and offers her a job at the zoo's gift shop. Irena reveals she is a virgin in conversation with Alice, who shares a romantic history (and is still in love) with Oliver and sees her as a rival. One day, the panther tears Joe's arm off during a routine cage cleaning. Joe bleeds to death and Oliver resolves to euthanize the cat, only to find it missing. In its cage lies a puddle of melted flesh like the one found by the prostitute.

Paul turns up and makes a sexual advance towards Irena. She flees, flags down a police car and has second thoughts about turning Paul in, but a police dog catches a strong scent from the house and a detective is called in. In Paul's basement, police find shackles, bones and remains of dozens of corpses. They figure Paul is a serial killer who fed corpses to a captive black panther, and call in Oliver and Alice to investigate. On the run from Paul, Irena takes refuge in a frustrated romance with Oliver, fearing the consequences of physical intimacy.

Paul visits Irena again and explains their shared werecat heritage, thus revealing himself as the escaped panther. Mating with a human transforms a werecat into a black panther, and only by killing a human can it regain human form. He tells her their parents were siblings because werecats are ancestrally incestuous and only mating between werecats prevents the transformation. Paul resumes his sexual advances, hoping Irena will accept their predicament, but she does not. Paul transforms, attacks Oliver, and is shot by Alice. Oliver conducts a necropsy on Paul. A green gas emanates from the surgical cut and a human arm and hand reach up from within the corpse. Before Oliver can document this, Paul's corpse melts into a pool of slime.

As Irena's feline instincts gradually emerge, she stalks and nearly attacks Alice twice. She later sleeps with Oliver and transforms into a panther, but she flees, sparing his life, and is later trapped on a bridge by police. Oliver arrives in time to see her jump off the bridge. Realizing where she is headed, he confronts Irena at a secluded lake house. She has regained human form by killing the house's caretaker. Irena tells Oliver she did not kill him because she loves him, and begs him to kill her. When he refuses, she begs him to have sex with her again so she can transform and "be with [her] own kind". Oliver reluctantly agrees. He ties Irena naked to the bedposts by her arms and legs in preparation for when she changes into the panther. They then have sex one last time, as Irena begins to transform.

Some time later, Oliver is again in a one-sided relationship with Alice. He stops at the cage holding the "recaptured panther" – Irena, now permanently trapped in her panther form. Reaching through the bars, Oliver hand-feeds and strokes the now-docile Irena's neck before she glances at him and roars.

== Cast ==
- Nastassja Kinski as Irena Gallier
- Malcolm McDowell as Paul Gallier
- John Heard as Oliver Yates
- Annette O'Toole as Alice Perrin
- Ruby Dee as Female
- Ed Begley Jr. as Joe Creigh
- Scott Paulin as Bill Searle
- Frankie Faison as Detective Brandt (dubbed by Albert Hall)
- Lynn Lowry as Ruthie
- John Larroquette as Bronte Judson
- Tessa Richarde as Billie
- Berry Berenson as Sandra
- Ray Wise as soap opera man

== Themes ==
Schrader has said, in relation to the erotic and horror aspects of Cat People, that the film "contains more skin than blood". He has described the film as being more about the mythical than the realistic. He has likened the relationship between Oliver and Irena to Dante and Beatrice, putting the female on a pedestal.

== Production ==
=== Development ===
British-based American producer Milton Subotsky bought the rights to Cat People from RKO Pictures and began developing a remake. Subotsky eventually passed the property to Universal Pictures. Initially, Roger Vadim was set to be the director of the remake. Alan Ormsby, the screenwriter of the remake, stated that the film went through three earlier scripts, two of which were written by Bob Clark. According to Ormsby, Vadim was concerned that the film would appear sexist, as the woman who was sexually intense had to be destroyed. Ormsby changed this in the remake to have a male character who has the same problem. Ormsby reworked the script to also have a more Southern Gothic style compared to the original film.

=== Filming ===
In the early 1980s, Universal hired director Paul Schrader to direct the remake. The remake was announced and began shooting in April 1981. According to cinematographer John Bailey, Schrader paid homage to the stalking scene in the original with a scene featuring Annette O'Toole's character jogging through a park as she appears to be stalked. Bailey and Schrader also remade the swimming pool scene. Bailey recalled that the two carefully studied the original scene, taking note of how the shadows reflected against the pool. Bailey stated that the pool sequence was the more similar of the homages, remarking that the primary reason for this was that "we didn't think we could do it any better".

The Blu-ray features interviews with Kinski, McDowell, Heard and O'Toole as well as director Schrader and composer Moroder. McDowell indicated that he was somewhat reluctant to make the film at first because he recalled the original film as "not being very good" but was convinced by Schrader's take on the material with its focus on the erotic horror elements. McDowell also revealed that the scene where he leaps on the bed in a cat-like fashion was shot with him jumping off the bed. They then ran the film backward. Heard discussed how he almost turned down the role because he believed it was a porno movie. He also recalled that he felt very awkward, particularly during the nude scenes. O'Toole discussed the fact that they used cougars that were dyed black because leopards are impossible to train.

== Release ==
The film was released theatrically in the United States by Universal Pictures on April 2, 1982.

=== Home media ===
The film has been released twice on DVD in the United States; once by Image Entertainment in 1997 and again by Universal in 2002 on the film's 20th Anniversary.

In January 2014, Scream Factory released the film in a collector's edition package featuring both Blu-ray and DVD editions. On August 30, 2022, Scream Factory issued the film again in 4K UHD Blu-ray format. In their review of the 4K UHD Blu-ray, Chuck Bowen and Jake Cole of Slant Magazine praised it as a significant upgrade from the prior release, writing that the 2014 Blu-ray "suffered from extensive digital noise reduction that left many images flattened and waxy, but their UHD comes from a new 4K scan that more accurately captures the film’s earthen tones."

== Reception ==
=== Box office ===
Cat People opened in 600 cinemas in the United States, and grossed $1,617,636 during its opening weekend, opening at number 10 at the box office. It earned an additional $1,502,216 during its second weekend, and $846,603 during its third weekend. It remained in distribution for 39 weeks, and concluded its theatrical run with a $7 million domestic gross. It earned an additional $14 million in international markets, making for a worldwide gross of $21 million.

=== Critical response ===
On the review aggregator website Rotten Tomatoes, 66% of 61 critics' reviews are positive. The website's consensus reads: "Paul Schrader's kinky reimagining of Cat People may prove too grisly and lurid for some audiences, but its provocative style and Nastassja Kinski's hypnotic performance should please viewers who like a little gasoline with their fire." Metacritic, which uses a weighted average, assigned the film a score of 61 out of 100, based on 17 critics, indicating "generally favorable" reviews.

Roger Ebert of the Chicago Sun-Times rated the film a three and a half out of four stars, stating, "Cat People is a good movie in an old tradition, a fantasy-horror film that takes itself just seriously enough to work, has just enough fun to be entertaining, contains elements of intrinsic fascination in its magnificent black leopards, and ends in one way just when we were afraid it was going to end in another".

Variety also gave the film a positive rating by praising Nastassja Kinski's performance: "Kinski was essential to the film as conceived, and she's endlessly watchable". Leonard Maltin awarded the film a mixed two out of a possible four stars, calling it "sexy, bloody, technically well crafted, but uneven and ultimately unsatisfying". However, Kinski stated, when being interviewed by her friend and actress Jodie Foster in Film Comment, that she disliked the film, describing it as "slick" and "manipulative". This surprised Foster, who asserted she thoroughly enjoyed the film.

Christopher John of Ares magazine commented that "Cat People is distinguished as one of the year's top science fantasies for several reasons: aside from its superior camera work, tight story line and the rest, the movie told a story that mainstream filmmakers shy away from – a sexual story".

=== Accolades ===
Award/association	Date	Category	Recipient(s) and nominee(s)	Result	Ref.
Golden Globe Awards	January 29, 1983	Best Original Motion Picture Score	Giorgio Moroder	Nominated	
Golden Globe Awards	January 29, 1983	Best Original Motion Picture Song	David Bowie	Nominated	
Saturn Awards	July 30, 1982	Best Actress	Nastassja Kinski	Nominated	

== Soundtrack ==
Cat People: Original Soundtrack

Soundtrack album by Giorgio Moroder
- Released: April 2, 1982
- Recorded: 1981
- Studios: Carla Ridge, Beverley Hills, California; Mountain, Montreux, Switzerland
- Genres: Synth-pop; electronic
- Length: 35:00
- Label: MCA
- Producer: Giorgio Moroder

Singles from Cat People
- 1. "Cat People (Putting Out Fire)" Released: April 1982

The soundtrack album was released by MCA Records the same week as the film. The theme song, "Cat People (Putting Out Fire)", was performed by David Bowie, who wrote the lyrics to music composed by Giorgio Moroder. The song was released as a single in 1982.

=== Track listing ===
All compositions by Moroder, lyrics by David Bowie on "Cat People (Putting Out Fire)".

Side one

1. "Cat People (Putting Out Fire)" – 6:41
2. "The Autopsy" – 1:30
3. "Irena's Theme" – 4:18
4. "Night Rabbit" – 1:57
5. "Leopard Tree Dream" – 4:01

Side two

1. "Paul's Theme (Jogging Chase)" – 3:52
2. "The Myth" – 5:09
3. "To the Bridge" – 2:49
4. "Transformation Seduction" – 2:43
5. "Bring the Prod" – 1:58

=== Personnel ===
- Bob Badami – music editor
- Brian Banks – additional keyboards, Synclavier II programming
- Steve Bates – assistant engineer, mixing assistant
- David Bowie – vocals on "Cat People (Putting Out Fire)" & humming vocal on "The Myth"
- Alexandra Brown – backing vocals
- Keith Forsey – drums, percussion
- Brian Gardner – mastering
- Craig Huxley – blaster beam
- Charles Judge – Prophet 5 and Jupiter 8 programming
- Laurie Kanner – production coordinator
- Michael Landau – guitar
- Sylvester Levai – keyboards, arranged by
- Paulette MacWilliams – backing vocals
- Tim May – guitar
- Giorgio Moroder – producer, keyboards, guitar, bass, mixing
- Brian Reeves – engineer, mixing
- Lee Sklar – bass
- Stephanie Spruill – backing vocals
- Trevor Veitch – musical contractor
- Allen Zentz – mastering (Bowie's vocals)

=== Charts ===
==== Weekly charts ====
Chart (1982)	Peak position
Canada Top Albums/CDs (RPM)	18
Finnish Albums (Suomen virallinen lista)	16
New Zealand Albums (RMNZ)	4
Norwegian Albums (VG-lista)	2
Swedish Albums (Sverigetopplistan)	6
US Billboard 200	47

==== Year-end charts ====
Chart (1982)	Position
New Zealand Albums (RMNZ)	33

== Sources ==
- Bailey, John (2016). "John Bailey on Cat People". Cat People (Blu-ray). The Criterion Collection. ISBN 978-1-68143-201-4. CC2674BD.
- Newman, Kim (2009) [1999]. Cat People. New York City, New York: Palgrave Macmillan. ISBN 978-0-85170-741-9.
- Warren, Bill (July 1982). "Alan Ormsby on the Cat People". Starburst. Vol. 4, no. 11. Marvel UK.
