= The Curse of the Cat People =

1944 film by Robert Wise and Gunther von Fritsch

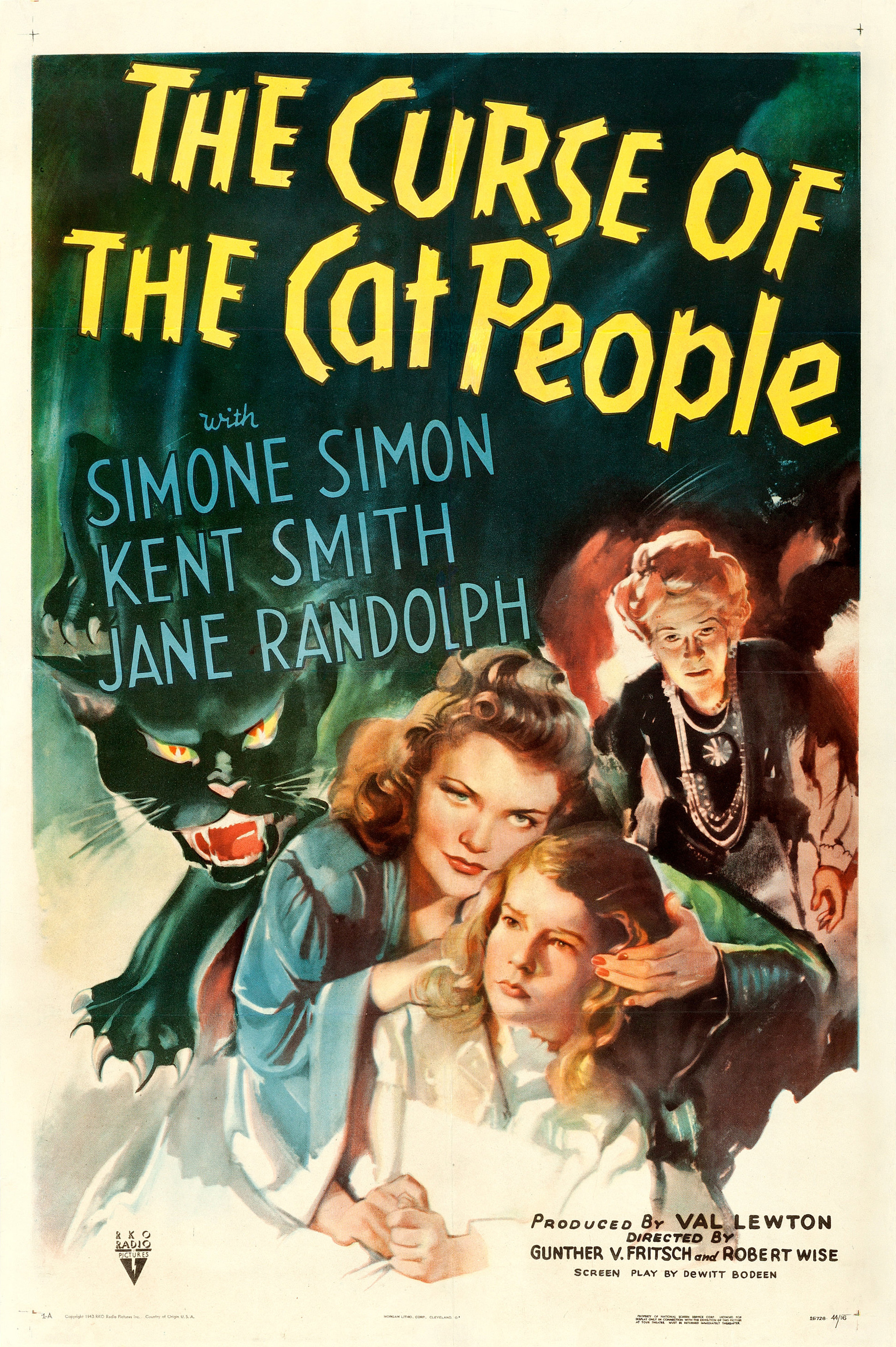
- Theatrical release poster by William Rose
- Directed by: Robert Wise; Gunther von Fritsch
- Written by: DeWitt Bodeen; Val Lewton (uncredited)
- Produced by: Val Lewton
- Starring: Simone Simon; Kent Smith; Jane Randolph; Ann Carter; Eve March
- Cinematography: Nicholas Musuraca
- Edited by: J.R. Whittredge
- Music by: Roy Webb
- Distributed by: RKO Radio Pictures
- Release date: March 2, 1944
- Running time: 70 minutes
- Country: United States
- Language: English
- Budget: $212,000

The Curse of the Cat People is a 1944 American psychological supernatural thriller film directed by Gunther von Fritsch and Robert Wise, produced by Val Lewton, and starring Simone Simon, Kent Smith, Jane Randolph, and Ann Carter. It tells a story about a young girl who befriends the ghost of her father's deceased first wife, a Serbian fashion designer who descended from a race of people who could transform into cats. The film, which marks Wise's first directing credit, is a sequel to Cat People (1942) and shares characters with the first film. The plot is only tangentially related to the original, though.

== Plot ==
Following the death of his wife, Irena Dubrovna, engineer Oliver Reed has remarried to his former co-worker, Alice Moore. The couple now have a six-year-old daughter, Amy, and reside in Tarrytown, New York. Oliver worries about Amy's extreme introversion and predilection to fantasy, as the behavior reminds him of Irena, whose madness drove her to death. At the urging of her parents, Amy attempts to make friends with the neighborhood children, who spurn her. While walking through the neighborhood, Amy pauses in front of a large house, which the other children claim is inhabited by a witch. An elderly woman's voice beckons Amy from a second-floor window, and she follows. From the window, the woman drops a handkerchief and a ring to the ground. Amy takes them, though the hankie is promptly snatched from her by Barbara Farren, the elderly woman's rejected daughter.

The Reeds' butler, Edward, tells Amy the ring appears to be a "wishing ring" and suggests she make a wish to it. In the garden, Amy wishes simply for a friend. Moments later, a wind encircles her, and she begins frolicking with what Oliver and Edward observe as an imaginary friend. The next day, Amy goes back to the house to return the ring. She is met inside by Barbara's eccentric elderly mother, a former stage actress named Julia, who tells Amy that her real daughter is dead, and that Barbara is a spy posing as her. Amy looks on as Julia dramatically re-enacts the legend of the Headless Horseman of Sleepy Hollow, but the story is cut short when Edward comes to retrieve Amy. After Amy leaves, Barbara chastises Julia for the way she treats her, but Julia continues to insist that Barbara is an imposter, and that her daughter died when she was six years old.

That night, Amy has a nightmare about the Headless Horseman, but she is calmed by the maternal presence of her friend—manifesting as a shadow—who sings a song to her. In the morning, Amy finds a photograph of Irena, whom she identifies as her mysterious new friend. Alice quickly hides the photograph. Amy wanders outside, where she is met by Irena's ghost, and the two play together in the garden.

On Christmas Eve, Amy quietly slips outside during a family gathering to give Irena a gift in the garden. She subsequently visits the Farren house on Christmas Day, and gives Julia a ring, which delights her. This enrages Barbara, whose gifts have been rejected by Julia, and Barbara vows to murder Amy should she ever return to the house. A short time later, Amy finds a photograph of Oliver and Irena together, and insists that she knows her. Oliver dismisses this as one of Amy's fantasies and punishes her. As Amy sobs in her bedroom, she is visited by Irena, who tells her that she must depart, explaining that she is interfering with Amy's relationship with her father. Amy begs Irena to stay, but Irena disappears, so Amy wanders outside to search for her. Shortly after, Oliver and Alice realize Amy has left the house.

Outside, Amy becomes caught in a blizzard as she wanders through country backroads. She eventually seeks shelter at the Farren home. Julia takes her in, but attempts to hide her upstairs, fearing Barbara will harm Amy out of jealousy. A panicked Julia suffers a heart attack while climbing the stairs and dies. Barbara appears and menacingly approaches Amy. Frightened, Amy invokes Irena, who superimposes herself over Barbara, and Amy embraces what she sees as her friend. This disarms Barbara, who returns the child's embrace. Moments later, Oliver and police arrive at the house. Oliver hugs Amy, and they return home. On the porch, Oliver agrees to accept his daughter's imaginary companions. Watching them from the garden, Irena disappears as Oliver and Amy enter the house.

== Cast ==
- Simone Simon as the ghost of Irena Dubrovna Reed
- Kent Smith as Oliver Reed
- Jane Randolph as Alice Reed
- Ann Carter as Amy Reed
- Eve March as Miss Callahan
- Julia Dean as Julia Farren
- Elizabeth Russell as Barbara Farren
- Erford Gage as Police Captain
- Sir Lancelot as Edward

== Production ==
The film, which began production at the RKO Gower Street studios in Hollywood on August 26, 1943, and wrapped on October 4, with additional shooting the week of November 21, marked two directorial debuts. Gunther von Fritsch had only directed short subjects to that time, so the film marked his feature debut, but when he fell behind schedule, having gotten only halfway through the screenplay in the 18 days of filming that had been allocated, the studio assigned film editor Robert Wise to take over, which earned him his first directorial credit. By the end of filming, the film, which had done some location shooting at Malibou Lake, California, was nine days behind schedule, and its budget had to be increased from $147,000 to $212,000. As was typical with Lewton's films, the tight budget demanded that sets be repurposed from other RKO productions, in this case those of Orson Welles' The Magnificent Ambersons (1942), which had also provided sets for Cat People.

Although the film was marketed as a sequel to Cat People (1942) and had four of the same actors (three of whom played the same characters in both films), The Curse of the Cat People has little in common with the earlier film. RKO studio executives wanted to cash in on the success of the first film and insisted on the title, despite producer Val Lewton's desire to change it to Amy and Her Friend. Lewton incorporated elements of his own life into the film, integrating autobiographical details from his childhood, such as the party invitations that are "mailed" by putting them into a hollow tree. Lewton also grew up not far from Tarrytown, where the story is set, and was fond of ghost stories such as "The Headless Horseman" (Washington Irving's "The Legend of Sleepy Hollow"), which is cited in The Curse of the Cat People.

Studio executives were disappointed when Lewton first screened the film for them, and they insisted on some additional scenes, such as that of the boys chasing a black cat in the park, being filmed and inserted into the picture. Some details that were crucial to the plot were lost in the re-editing necessary to accommodate the new scenes.

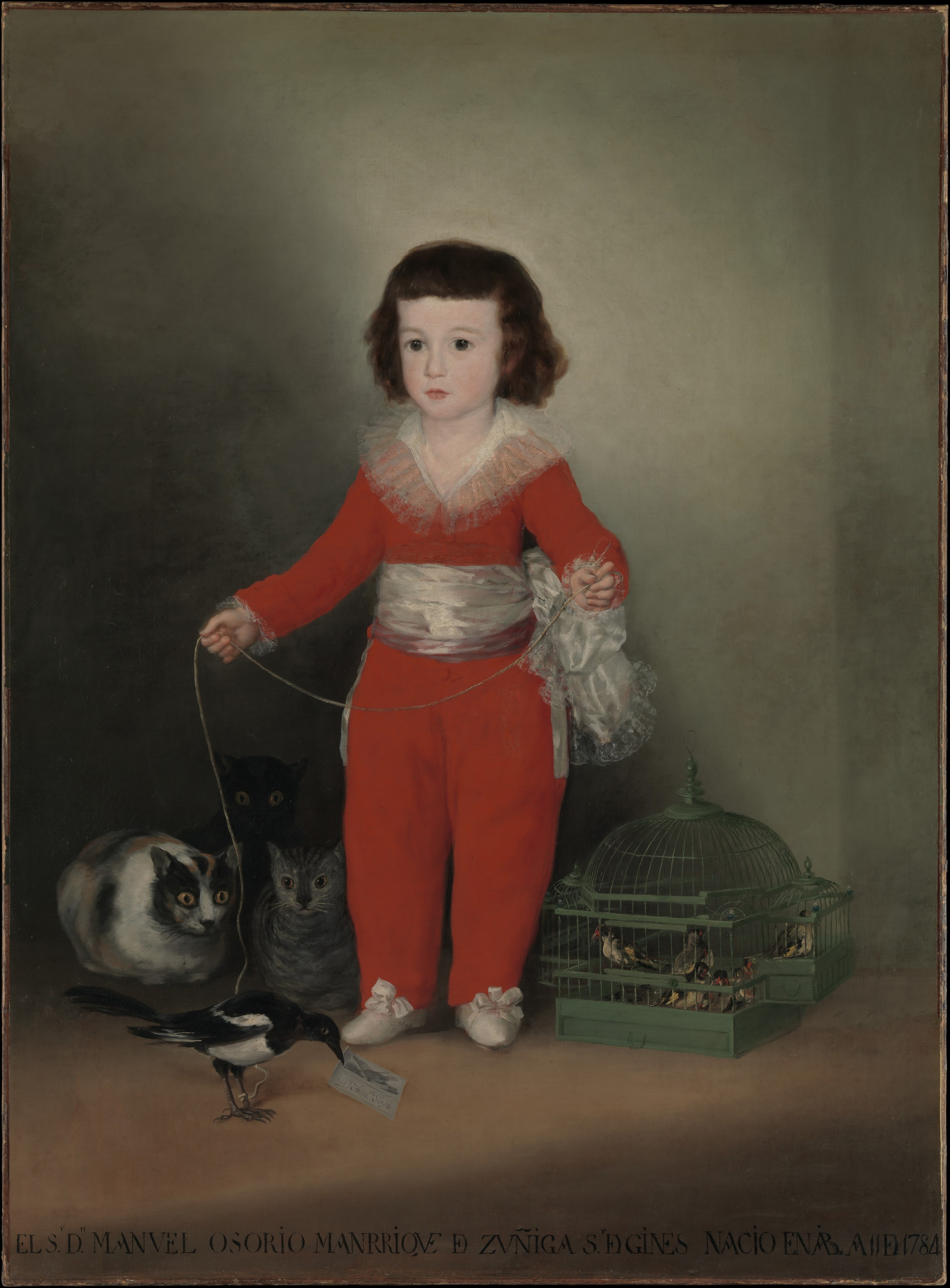
Manuel Osorio Manrique de Zúñiga by Goya, 1787–88

=== Production notes ===
- The painting in the Reed house that Alice describes as Irena's favorite piece of art is the portrait Manuel Osorio Manrique de Zúñiga by Francisco Goya.
- Irena's lullaby, a musical motif in the score of both this film and Cat People, is an adaptation of the French lullaby "Do, do, l'enfant do". The carol Irena sings in counterpoint to "Shepherds Shake Off Your Drowsy Sleep" is the traditional French Christmas carol "Il Est Né, Le Divin Enfant".
- Amy's teacher mentions a book, The Inner World of Childhood, which is an actual book written by American psychologist Frances Wickes and published in 1927. Psychology pioneer Carl Jung admired the book, and in 1931, he wrote an introduction to it.

== Release ==
The Curse of the Cat People premiered in February 1944. It was often screened as a double bill with Cat People (1942).

=== Critical response ===
While Variety said the film was "highly disappointing", Bosley Crowther of The New York Times called it "a rare departure from the ordinary run of horror films [which] emerges as an oddly touching study of the working of a sensitive child's mind". James Agee wrote that the film captured "the poetry and danger of childhood".

The reputation of the film has grown since its initial release. Film historian William K. Everson found the same sense of beauty at work in The Curse of the Cat People and Jean Cocteau's La Belle et la Bête (1946). Director Joe Dante said the film's "disturbingly Disneyesque fairy tale qualities have perplexed horror fans for decades", and that it has been used in college psychology courses. In 2010, The Moving Arts Film Journal ranked The Curse of the Cat People as the 35th-greatest film of all time. On review aggregator website Rotten Tomatoes, the film holds an approval rating of 88% based on 34 reviews, with an average score of 7.3/10; the site's "critics consensus" reads: "Foregoing the horror thrills of its predecessor in favor of childhood fantasy, [The] Curse of the Cat People is a touching and psychologically complex family film couched in a ghost story".

=== Home media ===
The film is available on a double-feature DVD with Cat People, which itself is part of the Val Lewton Horror Collection DVD box set from Warner Home Video. It was also released on Blu-ray by Scream Factory in June 2018.

== See also ==
- List of American films of 1944
