= Fine grain master positive =

A fine grain master positive is a photographic term. It is also known as a fine grain master or fine grain and is a high-definition black-and-white intermediate positive image generated from a negative for the purpose of creating additional duplicate negatives. This intermediate element is exposed and chemically processed to a photographic gamma that will permit duplicate negatives as close to the original as is possible by a photochemical process.

While a fine grain master appears over-exposed and dark, it contains all of the information in the original negative, compressed into the toe and straight-line portion of the H&D curve via exposure and chemical processing. The image is uncompressed when the duplicate negative is made from the element and the tonal range expanded up into the top straight-line and shoulder portion of the H&D curve.

== See also ==
- Original camera negative
