= Rialto Theatre (New York City) =

Former theatre in Manhattan, New York

- Interactive map of Rialto Theatre
- Address: 1481 Broadway; Manhattan, New York City; United States
- Coordinates: 40.7563°N 73.9871°W
- Owner: Paramount Pictures
- Capacity: 1,960
- Type: Broadway
- Designation: Broadway

Construction
- Opened: April 21, 1916
- Closed: 1998
- Rebuilt: 1935
- Years active: 1916–1935

The Rialto Theatre was a movie palace at 1481 Broadway, at the northwest corner of Seventh Avenue and 42nd Street, within the Theater District of Manhattan in New York City.

The 1,960-seat theater, designed by Rosario Candela, opened on April 21, 1916, on the former site of Oscar Hammerstein's Vaudeville venue the Victoria Theatre. Together with Strand Theatre, they were the most important movie theatres on Broadway at the time. It exclusively played Triangle Film Corporation films but beginning in 1919, the Rialto Theatre premiered many releases by Paramount Pictures (then known as the Famous Players–Lasky Corporation) until being supplanted by the newly built Paramount Theatre in 1926 as the movie studio's flagship theater in New York City.

When Paramount sold the building in 1935, the Rialto Theatre was demolished and rebuilt on a smaller scale, with the rest of the building dedicated to shops and office space.

By the 1970s, the theater had become an adult movie theater. In February 1980, it abandoned adult films for legitimate theater, becoming host to live theatrical productions. The building also contained a TV studio called Times Square Studios (not related to the studio owned by ABC). It was once home to daytime talk shows hosted by Geraldo Rivera and Montel Williams, and was the production center of WOR-TV.

The building was torn down in 1998 and 3 Times Square, a high-rise office building, was erected in its place.

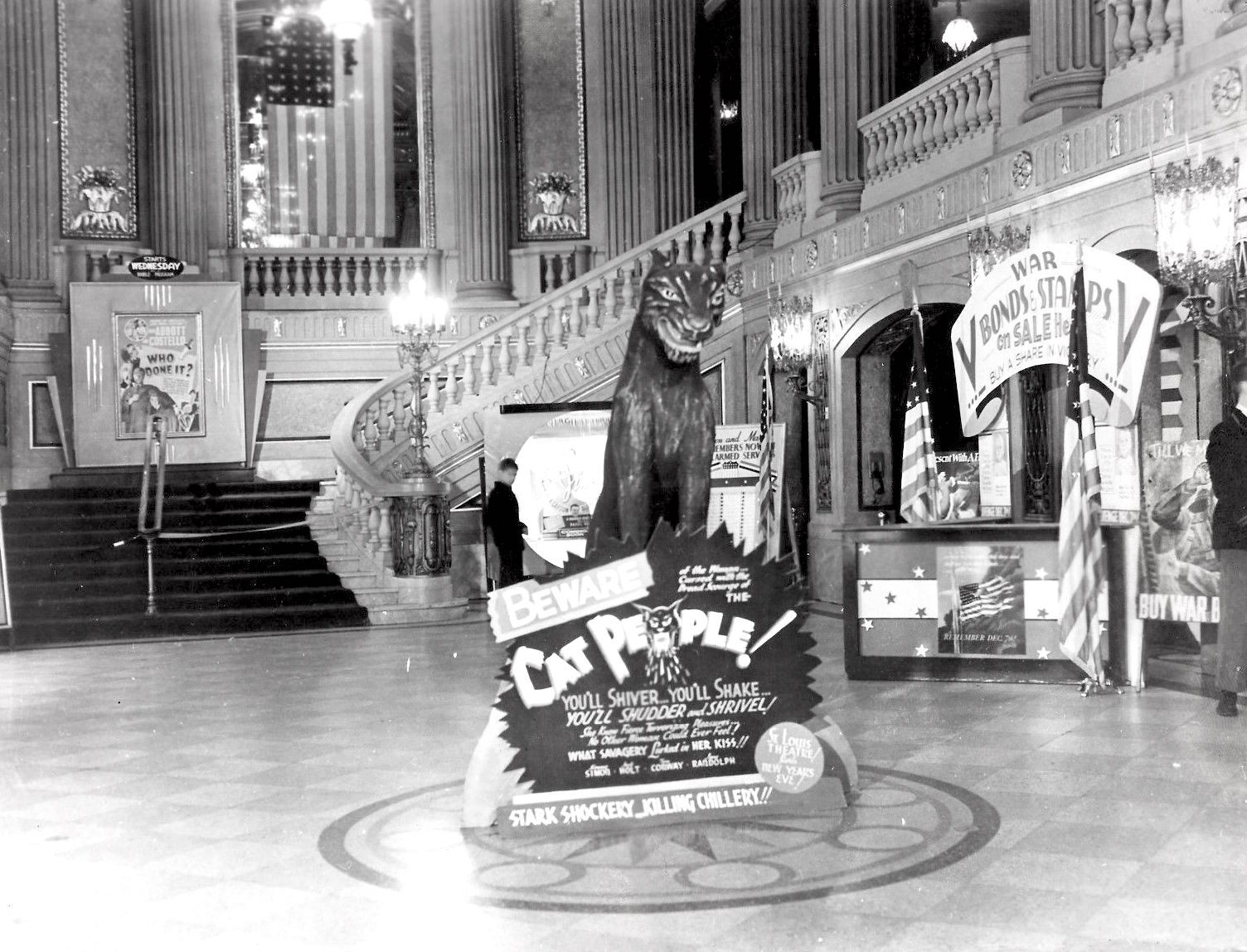
Lobby of the Rialto Theatre during Cat People premiere on 5 December 1942

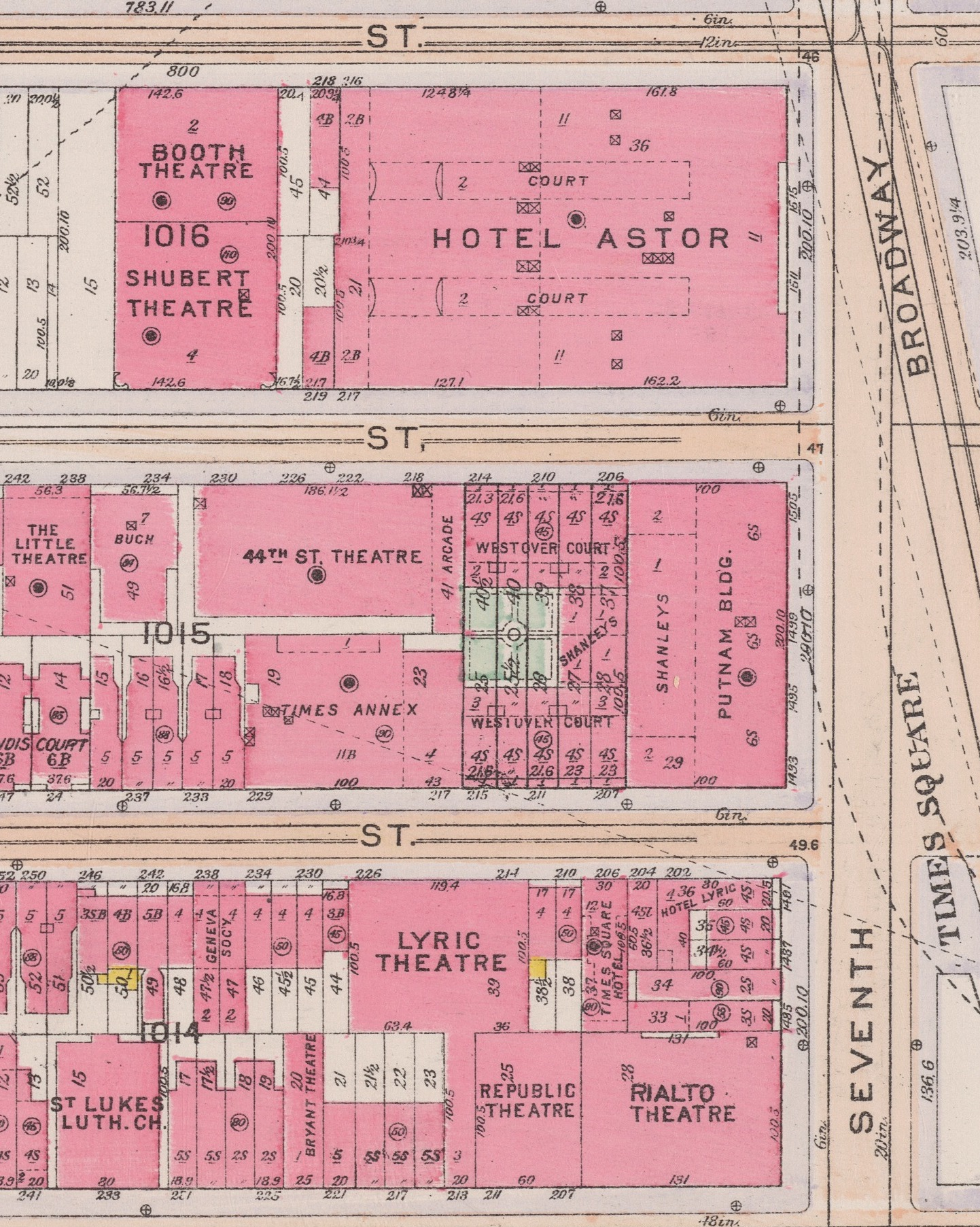
Times Square map in 1916 with the Rialto and other theatres

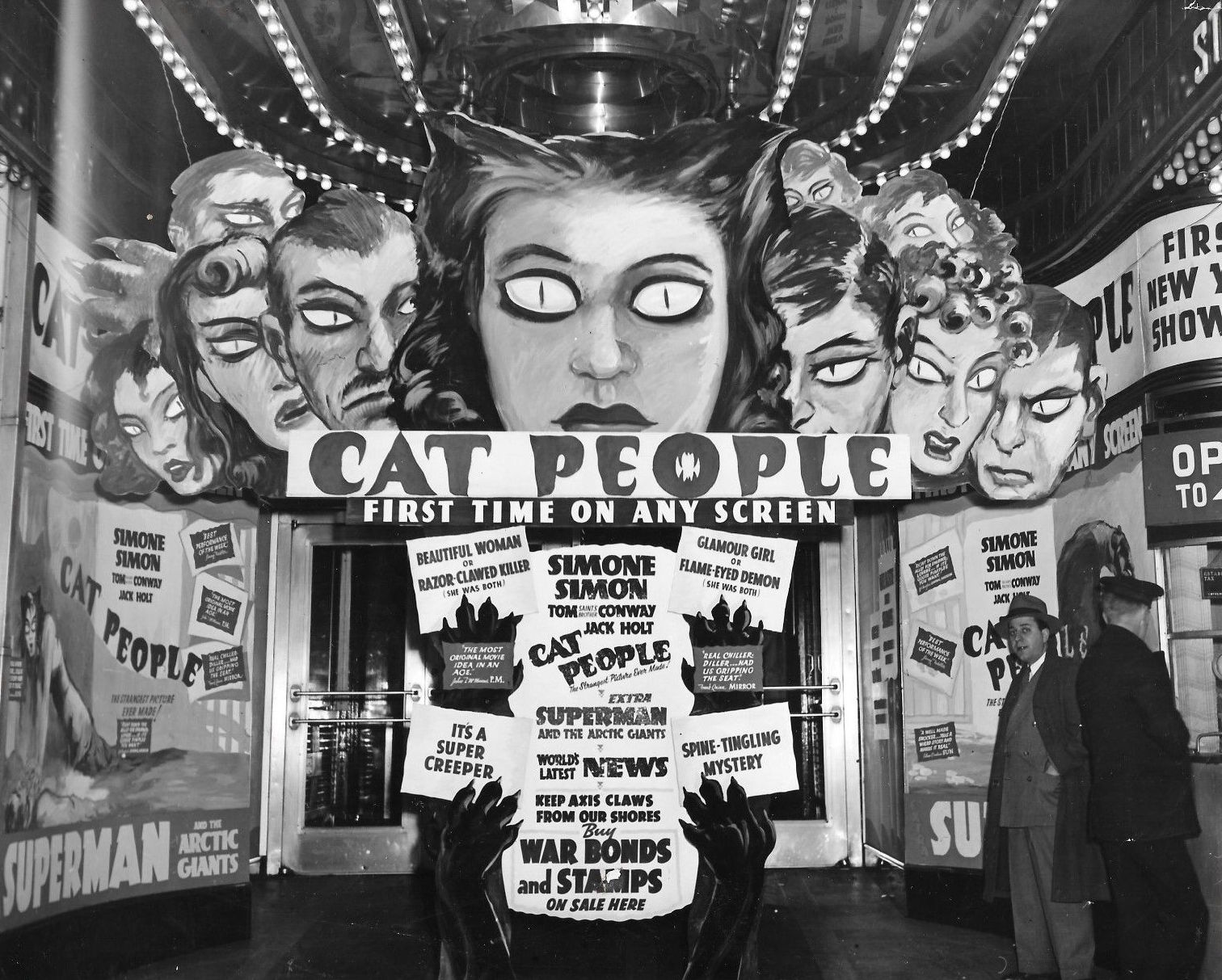
Cat People advertisements at theater entrance in 1942

== In popular culture ==
The Rialto's predecessor, the Hammerstein vaudeville venue, is featured in the 1948 film Portrait of Jennie. Jennie's parents are high-wire trapeze artists who perform at Hammerstein's until tragedy strikes. The Rialto itself also makes an appearance in the film, with a Mickey Mouse cartoon playing in the background. Box office receipts from the premiere at the Rialto Theatre of Paramount Pictures's 1926 movie Old Ironsides, directed by James Cruz, went to the USS Constitution restoration fund. It is also shown in John Cassavete's Shadows (1959).
