= DeWitt Bodeen =

American screenwriter

- Born: Homer DeWitt Bodeen; July 25, 1908 Fresno, California, United States
- Died: March 12, 1988 (aged 79) Los Angeles, California, United States
- Occupation: Screenwriter, television writer

DeWitt Bodeen (July 25, 1908 – March 12, 1988) was an American film screenwriter and television writer best known for writing Cat People (1942).

== Biography ==
Born Homer DeWitt Bodeen on July 25, 1908, in Fresno, California, he began his career as an actor and wrote more than 20 plays before entering the film business. He began his career in the film industry when his stage work drew the attention of film writer and producer Val Lewton, who arranged for Bodeen to work as a research assistant to British novelist Aldous Huxley.

He published his first book-length contribution to entertainment history in 1937, Ladies of the Footlights, a slim volume of theater celebrity profiles. (Note: His subjects were: Lola Montez, Adah Isaacs Menken, Lotta Crabtree, Pauline Cushman, Catherine Sinclair, Helena Modjeska, Adelaide Neilson, Ada Rehan, Lillie Langtry, Julia Dean, Laura Keene, Sarah Bernhardt, Fanny Davenport, Eleonora Duse, Matilda Heron, Julia Marlowe, Clara Morris, Mary Anderson, Ellen Terry, and Lillian Russell.)

In the late 1930s, he began working for RKO and worked his way up to a script writer. His screenwriting credits include Cat People (1942), The Curse of the Cat People (1944), The Seventh Victim (1943), The Enchanted Cottage (1945), I Remember Mama (1948), Night Song (1948), and Billy Budd (1962).

His play Harvest of Years premiered on Broadway in January 1948. It ran for two weeks.

Beginning in the 1950s he moved to television, writing mainly for anthology shows including Robert Montgomery Presents, Climax!, and Schlitz Playhouse of Stars among others.

Bodeen was gay.

In his later years he became a historian of Hollywood and the film industry. He wrote articles for the journal Films in Review (Note: For example, a profile of Ramon Novarro in November 1967.) and Focus on Film. His books included The Films of Cecil B. DeMille (1969), The Films and Career of Maurice Chevalier (1973), From Hollywood!: the careers of 15 great American stars (1972), and More from Hollywood!: the careers of 15 great American stars (1977). (Note: From Hollywood and More from Hollywood were collections of profiles previously published in periodicals.) He wrote one novel, the 1975 gothic roman à clef mystery 13 Castle Walk, which fictionalized the unsolved 1922 murder of film director William Desmond Taylor.

He was still writing in 1979 at the age of 70, when he lived at the Motion Picture Country Home in Woodland Hills, Los Angeles. He died there on March 12, 1988.
