= Skelton Knaggs =

English actor (1911–1955)

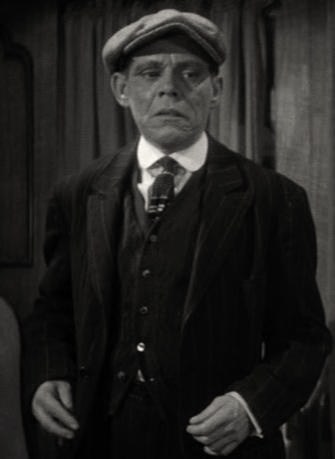
- Knaggs in Terror by Night (1946)
- Born: Skelton Barnaby Knaggs; 27 June 1911; Hillsborough, Sheffield, Yorkshire, England
- Died: 30 April 1955 (aged 43); Los Angeles, California, U.S.
- Resting place: Hollywood Forever Cemetery, Los Angeles, California, U.S.
- Occupation: Actor
- Years active: 1936–1955
- Spouse: Thelma Crawshaw (1949–1955)

Skelton Barnaby Knaggs (27 June 1911 – 30 April 1955) was an English stage actor who also appeared in films, especially in horror films.

== Biography ==
Knaggs was born in the Hillsborough district of Sheffield, England. (A published source referred to Knaggs as "The London-born actor ...") He moved from England to Syracuse, New York, in 1923 and finished Porter School in 1924. After attending Roosevelt Junior High School, he graduated from Vocational High School in 1929. He was the son of Mr. and Mrs. Harry Knaggs, and he had two brothers.

Knaggs acted in stock theater in Syracuse before he moved to London where he trained as an actor at the Royal Academy of Dramatic Art, and subsequently became a Shakespearean actor. In addition to appearing on stage in George Bernard Shaw's adaptation of Shakespeare's Cymbeline, Knaggs appeared in a few British films, debuting in Everything Is Thunder. He had an uncredited role as a German orderly in Michael Powell's The Spy in Black.

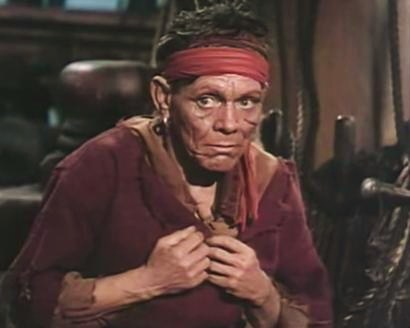
Skelton Knaggs in Blackbeard the Pirate (1952)

At some point he moved to Los Angeles, California, and found work as a character actor in Hollywood. Diminutive and distinctive-looking, with a strongly featured pock-marked face and charismatically voiced with an English Midlands provincial accent, he was cast in sinister roles, often in horror films. These ranged from uncredited bit parts to prominent roles in the Sherlock Holmes thriller Terror by Night, the all-star monster rally House of Dracula and three Val Lewton productions including The Ghost Ship. In the last, a voice-over narrative by Knaggs is heard, representing the thoughts of his character, a mute seaman.

Back in London, he married Thelma Crawshaw in 1949, then returned to Hollywood. The last film in which he appeared was Fritz Lang's period adventure based on J. Meade Falkner's novel Moonfleet.

== Death ==
An alcoholic, Knaggs died of cirrhosis of the liver in Hollywood, California, on May 1, 1955, aged 44. His body was buried in the Hollywood Forever Cemetery in Los Angeles.

== Filmography ==
Year	Title	Role	Notes
1936	Everything Is Thunder	Young Man with Lantern	Film debut, Uncredited
1936	Rembrandt	Minor Role	Uncredited
1937	The High Command	Fazerack	
1938	South Riding	Reg. Aythorne	
1939	The Spy in Black	German Sailor Looking for Capt. Hardt	Uncredited
1939	Torture Ship	Jesse Bixel	
1940	Diamond Frontier	Morgan	
1943	Thumbs Up	Shooting Gallery Concessionaire	Uncredited
1943	Headin' for God's Country	Jeff	
1943	Thank Your Lucky Stars	Villager in Pub	Uncredited
1943	The Ghost Ship	Finn - the Mute	Uncredited
1944	The Lodger	Man with Cart	Uncredited
1944	The Scarlet Claw	Villager in Pub	Uncredited
1944	The Invisible Man's Revenge	Alf Perry - a Cabman	Uncredited
1944	None But the Lonely Heart	Lou 'Slush' Atley	Uncredited
1945	The Picture of Dorian Gray	Blue Gate Fields Waiter	Uncredited
1945	Isle of the Dead	Henry Robbins	Uncredited
1945	House of Dracula	Steinmuhl	
1946	Terror by Night	Sands	
1946	Just Before Dawn	Louie	Uncredited
1946	Bedlam	Varney	Uncredited
1946	Night and Day	Newspaper Vendor	Uncredited
1946	A Scandal in Paris	Cousin Pierre	
1946	Dick Tracy vs. Cueball	Rudolph	
1947	Dick Tracy Meets Gruesome	X-Ray	
1947	Forever Amber	Blueskin	Uncredited
1948	The Paleface	Pete	
1949	Master Minds	Hugo	
1951	Captain Video: Master of the Stratosphere	Retner	Serial
1952	Million Dollar Mermaid	Cheering Man on Tower Bridge	Uncredited
1952	Blackbeard the Pirate	Gilly	
1953	Botany Bay	Newgate Prisoner Drawing on Cell Wall	Uncredited
1953	Rogue's March	Fish	
1954	Casanova's Big Night	Little Man	Uncredited
1954	General Electric Theater	Man on Crutches	1 episode
1955	Son of Sinbad	Sidewalk Spectator	Uncredited
1955	TV Reader's Digest	Gibson	1 episode
1955	Moonfleet	Jacob	Final film
