= Moonfleet (1984 TV series) =

- Genre: Adventure
- Based on: Moonfleet by J. Meade Falkner
- Written by: George Day
- Directed by: Colin Cant
- Starring: David Daker
- Country of origin: United Kingdom
- Original language: English
- No. of series: 1
- No. of episodes: 6

Production
- Producer: Paul Stone
- Running time: 30 minutes
- Production company: BBC

Original release
- Network: BBC One
- Release: 22 February – 28 March 1984

Moonfleet is a British period television drama series which aired on BBC One in 1984. It is based on the classic 1898 adventure novel Moonfleet by J. Meade Falkner, about smuggling on the Dorset coast in the eighteenth century, earlier made into a 1955 film of the same title directed by Fritz Lang.

== Main cast ==
- Victoria Blake as Grace Maskew
- David Daker as Elzevir Block
- Adam Godley as John Trenchard
- Bernard Gallagher as Sexton Ratsey
- David Gant as Reverend Glennie
- Ewan Hooper as Magistrate Maskew
- Stewart Harwood as Thomas
- Hilary Mason as Jane Arnold

== Bibliography ==
- Goble, Alan. The Complete Index to Literary Sources in Film. Walter de Gruyter, 1999.
