= Fleet Old Church =

Mortuary chapel in Dorset, England

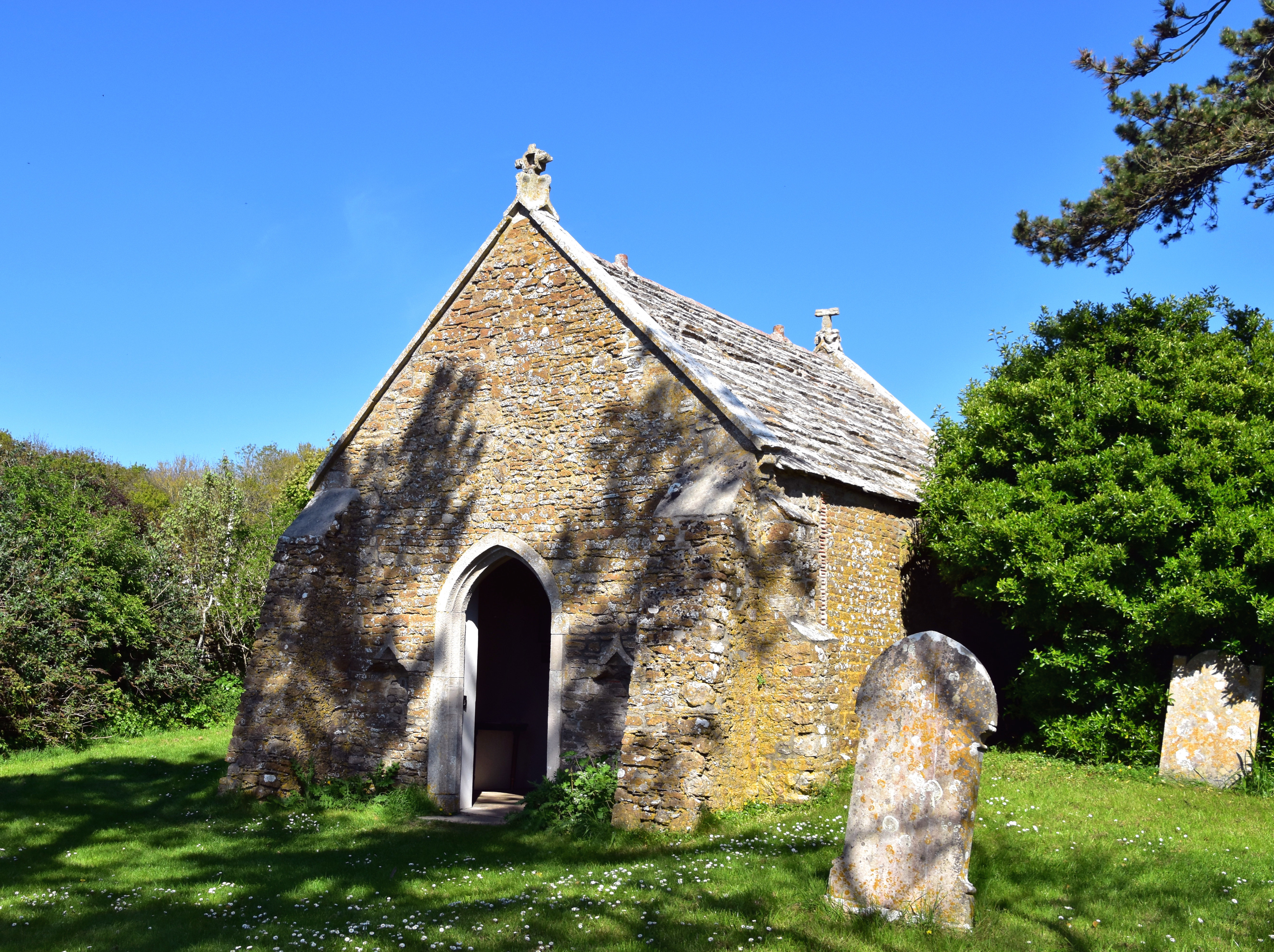

Religion
- Affiliation: Church of England

Location
- Location: Fleet, Dorset, England
- Interactive map of Fleet Old Church
- Coordinates: 50.6190°N 2.5166°W

Architecture
- Type: Church

Fleet Old Church is a Church of England mortuary chapel in Fleet, Dorset, England. It was formerly the village's parish church until its partial destruction in the Great Storm of 1824. The surviving chancel is now a Grade II* listed building.

== History ==
A church at Fleet is known to have existed as early as 1086 when one was recorded in the Domesday Book, with a monk from Abbotsbury Abbey named Bolla as the village's priest. The church's surviving chancel is believed to date to the 15th century, suggesting it was later rebuilt. The church was dedicated to Holy Trinity and belonged to the Christchurch Priory until the Dissolution of the Monasteries. In a 1552 survey of the "Church Goods of Dorset", Fleet's church was recorded as having a tower with two bells.

The church's nave was significantly damaged in the Great Storm of 1824, which also destroyed a number of the village's houses. Owing to the extent of the church's damage, the Rector of Fleet, Rev. George Gould, decided to have a new church constructed at his expense. Designed by William Strickland and built in 1827–29, the new church of Holy Trinity was sited 540 yards inland from the original church.

With the construction of the new church, the nave of the original was demolished in 1827, but the chancel was retained and repaired for use as a mortuary chapel. The church was featured in the 1898 novel Moonfleet by J. Meade Falkner.

== Architecture ==
The surviving chancel is built of local rubble, with freestone dressings and stone slate roofs. It has a window of 17th century origin, with the side walls each containing a blocked window. The interior has an arch-braced collar roof. A number of monuments survive within the building: one to Robert Mohun, dated 1603, one to Maximilian Mohun, dated 1612, and another to Francis Mohun, dated 1711–12. There is also a plaque dedicated to J. Meade Faulkner.
