= Gore Cove =

Cove in Dorset, England

Coordinates: 50°37′29″N 2°32′45″W

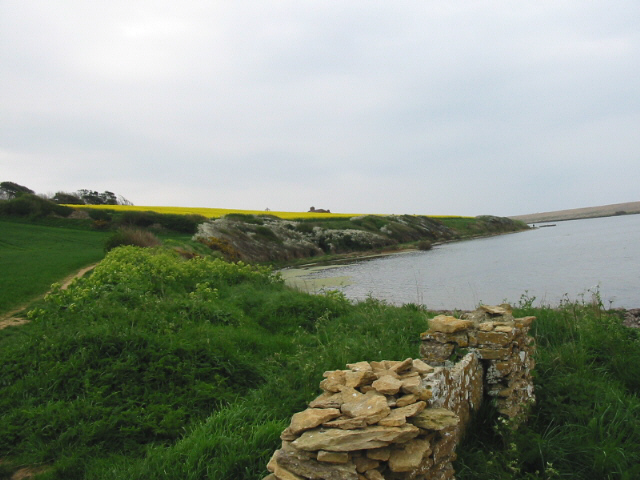
Gore Cove on the Fleet.

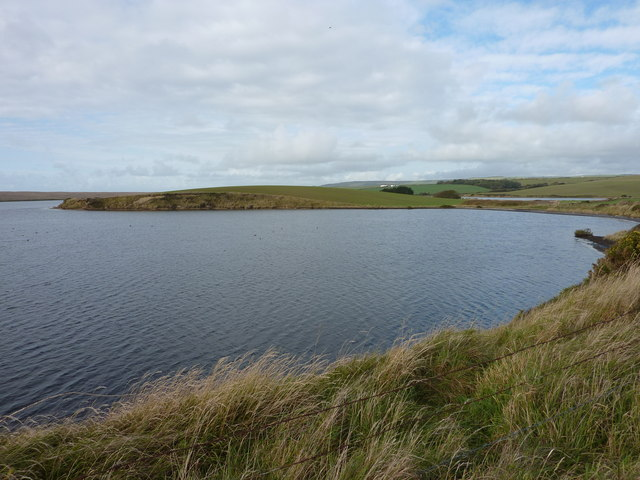
Herbury and Gore Cove. View from the South West Coast Path close to Moonfleet Manor Hotel.

Gore Cove is an inlet cove in the Fleet lagoon behind Chesil Beach, on the south coast of Dorset, England, located on the Jurassic Coast World Heritage Site.

Herbury is a small peninsula jutting out into the Fleet by Gore Cove. The Moonfleet Manor Hotel is located close by. To the east is the coastal town of Weymouth. To the southeast is the Isle of Portland.
