= Bedlam (1946 film) =

1946 film by Mark Robson

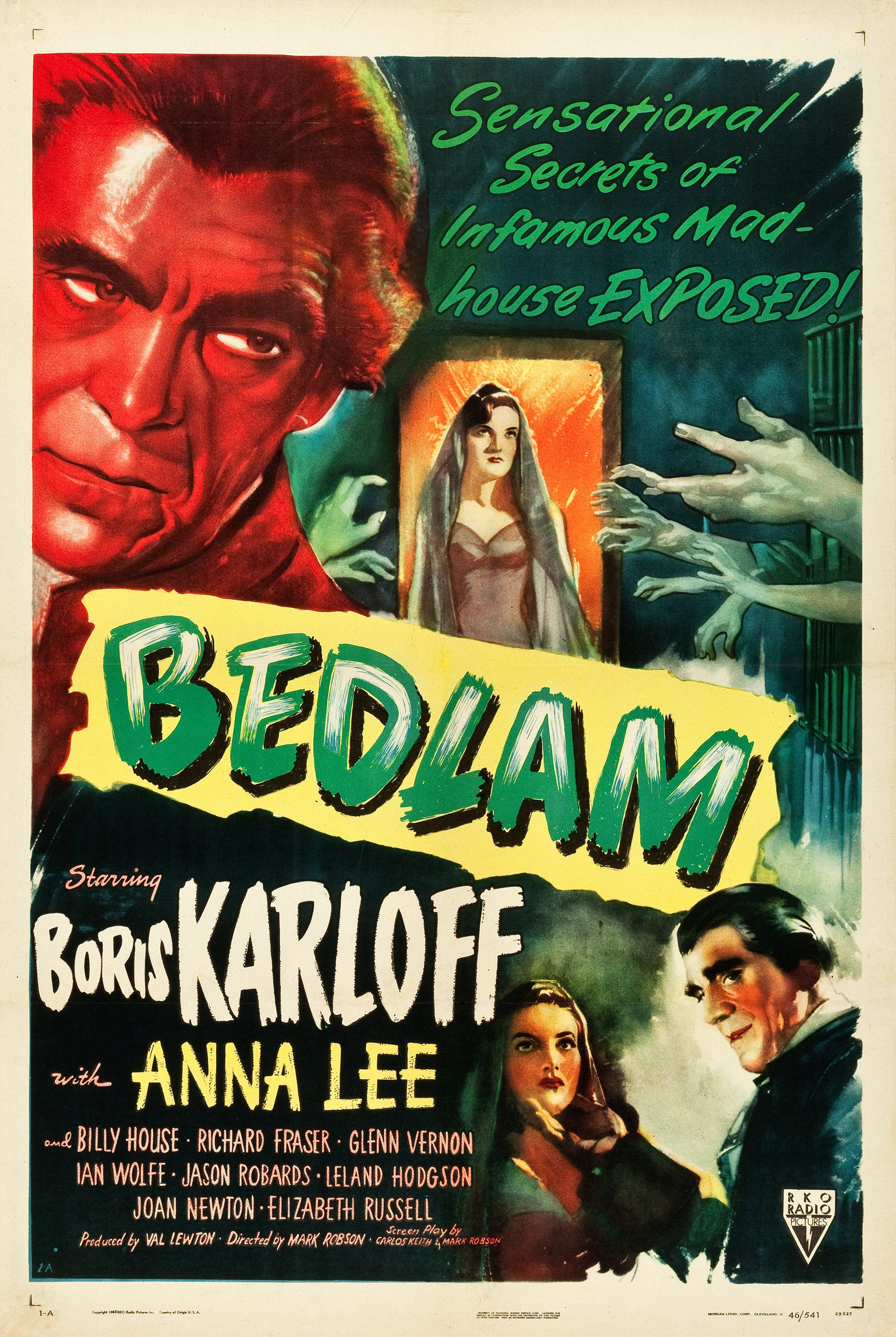
- Theatrical release poster by William Rose
- Directed by: Mark Robson
- Written by: William Hogarth(A Rake's Progress); Val Lewton; Mark Robson
- Produced by: Val Lewton
- Starring: Boris Karloff; Anna Lee; Billy House
- Cinematography: Nicholas Musuraca
- Edited by: Lyle Boyer
- Music by: Roy Webb
- Production company: RKO Radio Pictures
- Distributed by: RKO Radio Pictures
- Release date: May 10, 1946
- Running time: 79 minutes
- Country: United States
- Language: English
- Budget: $350,000

Bedlam is a 1946 American horror film directed by Mark Robson and starring Boris Karloff, Anna Lee and Richard Fraser, and was the last in a series of stylish horror B films produced by Val Lewton for RKO Radio Pictures. The film was inspired by William Hogarth's 1732–1734 painting series A Rake's Progress, and Hogarth was given a writing credit.

== Plot ==
It is 1761 in London at St Mary Bethlehem asylum for the mentally ill and an acquaintance of Lord Mortimer dies in an attempt to escape from the asylum. Master George Sims appeases Mortimer by having his "loonies" put on a show for him. Mortified by the treatment of the patients, Mortimer's protégée Nell Bowen seeks his aid, then that of Whig politician John Wilkes to reform the asylum, threatening Sims' corrupt practices.

Mortimer and Sims conspire to commit Nell to the asylum, where her initial fears of the fellow inmates do not alter her sympathetic commitment to improving their conditions as she tends to the comfort of her fellow inmates. Alarmed by Bowen's imminent release, following legal pressure from Wilkes, Sims plans to apply his most drastic "cure" to her, but his attempt is thwarted by the inmates whom Nell has helped.

Sidney Long, an inmate who was a lawyer, insists on a fair trial for Sims. Sims' "defense" reveals his own mental instability. An inmate stabs Sims from behind with a trowel that Nell had obtained from her Quaker friend Hannay, a mason by trade. Believing Sims to be dead, the inmates bury him inside the walls. At the last minute, Sims regains consciousness and he realizes he is being walled up alive.

Nell is rescued by Hannay. They decide that Sims' fate should remain a mystery to the outside world. The "insane" inmates could not be held legally responsible under the law in any event. She addresses Hannay with the archaic familiar pronouns thee and thou, suggesting that they have formed a closer relationship.

== Cast ==
- Boris Karloff as Master George Sims
- Anna Lee as Nell Bowen
- Billy House as Lord Mortimer
- Richard Fraser as Hannay
- Glen Vernon as The Gilded Boy
- Ian Wolfe as Sidney Long
- Jason Robards Sr. as Oliver Todd
- Leyland Hodgson as John Wilkes
- Joan Newton as Dorothea the Dove
- Elizabeth Russell as Mistress Sims
- Frankie Dee as Pompie
- Skelton Knaggs as Varney (uncredited)
- John Goldsworthy as Chief Commissioner (uncredited)
- Ellen Corby as Queen of the Artichokes
- Robert Clarke as "Dan The Dog"

== Production ==
Mark Robson said he reproduced "much of Hogarth’s The Rake's Progress in our film; in fact, we virtually used Hogarth as our art director. The dialogue was an amalgam of all kinds of eighteenth-century characters, including Lord Sandwich and various others."

== Release ==
=== Initial response ===
The New York Time's critic Bosley Crowther praised Anna Lee's performance and called the film "several cuts above the average run of so-called horror films... a generally straight-forward and imaginative estimate of a two-century-old sociological theme." Variety called it "morbid and depressing, but fascinating at the same time." Nevertheless, the movie recorded a loss of $40,000.

=== Later response ===
In 2005, Video Hound's Golden Movie Retriever rated it 3 out of a possible 4 stars and called it a "fine horror movie."

In 2014, Variety described it as an "elegant horror movie" which "abounds with nightmarish images of jabbering lunatics forced to perform for Karloff’s diabolical amusement."

In 2015, film critic Leonard Maltin awarded the film three out of a possible four stars, commending the film's atmosphere.

A 2017 article in The New York Times included Bedlam in a set of films that "serve as terrific Halloween binge-watching."

On Rotten Tomatoes, the film holds an approval rating of 90% based on 21 reviews, with a weighted average rating of 6.4/10.

=== Home media ===
The film was released on DVD by Warner Bros. as part of a double release with Isle of the Dead and as part of the Val Lewton Horror Collection, featuring a commentary by film historian Tom Weaver. A Warner Bros “Archive Collection” blu-ray double bill with Lewton’s The Ghost Ship was released in the US and UK in 2023 (also directed by Mark Robson), retaining the Tom Weaver commentary.

== See also ==
- Boris Karloff filmography
