= Fleet, Dorset =

Village and civil parish in Dorset, England

Coordinates: 50.6224°N 2.5191°W

Fleet
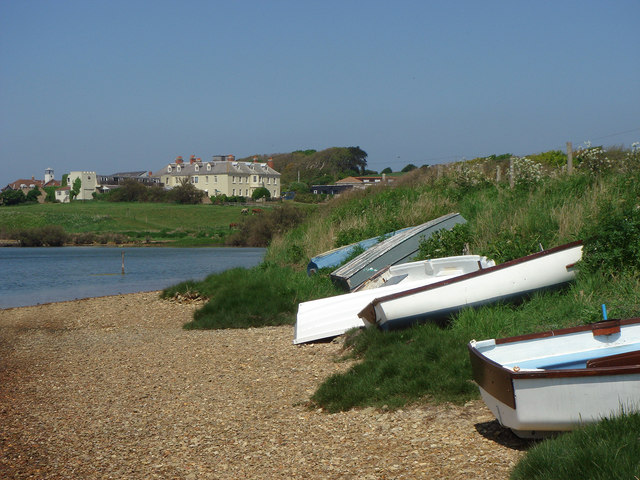
- Moonfleet Manor Hotel

- Location within Dorset
- Population: 60
- OS grid reference: SY634805
- Unitary authority: Dorset
- Ceremonial county: Dorset
- Region: South West
- Country: England
- Sovereign state: United Kingdom
- Post town: Weymouth
- Postcode district: DT3
- Police: Dorset
- Fire: Dorset and Wiltshire
- Ambulance: South Western
- UK Parliament: West Dorset

Fleet is a small scattered village and civil parish in south Dorset, England, situated approximately 2.5 miles (4.0 km) west of Weymouth. It consists of the small settlements of East Fleet, West Fleet, Fleet House, and Fleet Common, all of which are close to the shore of The Fleet, a brackish lagoon behind Chesil Beach. The name "Fleet" is derived from fleot, Old English for an inlet or estuary. Dorset County Council estimated that the population of the civil parish was 60 in 2013.

The Great Storm of 1824 caused waves to breach Chesil Beach, and many of the buildings in the village were destroyed, including the nave of the original parish church. An eye-witness described the event:

At six o'-clock on the morning of the 23rd I was standing with other boys by the gate near the cattle pound when I saw, rushing up the valley, the tidal wave, driven by a hurricane and bearing upon its crest a whole haystack and other debris from the fields below. We ran for our lives to Chickerell, and when we returned found that five houses had been swept away and the church was in ruins.

A new church, Holy Trinity, was built a short distance inland and only the chancel of the old one stands today.

J. Meade Falkner's smuggling novel Moonfleet is set in the village. There is a brass memorial to Falkner in the old church, together with brass plate memorials to members of the Mohun family whose name was used in the novel. Moonfleet Manor Hotel is a Georgian building in the west of the parish on the shore of The Fleet, previously called Fleet House.

The bouncing bomb, designed by Barnes Wallis and immortalised in the film The Dam Busters, was tested on the waters of the Fleet.

== See also ==
- Gore Cove
