= The Nebuly Coat =

1903 novel by J. Meade Falkner

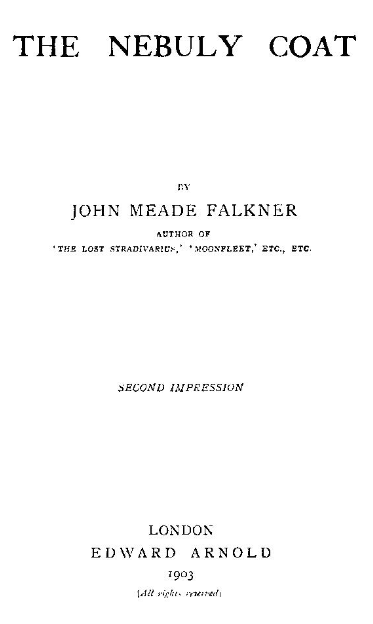
- Title page for The Nebuly Coat (1903)
- Author: J. Meade Falkner
- Language: English
- Publication date: 1903
- Publication place: Britain

The Nebuly Coat is a suspense novel written by J. Meade Falkner. It was published in 1903 and has since been adapted for the stage.

== Plot ==
The book tells of the experiences of a young architect, Edward Westray, who is sent to the remote town of Cullerne to supervise restoration work on Cullerne Minster. He finds himself caught up in Cullerne life, and hears rumours about a mystery surrounding the claim to the title of Lord Blandamer, whose coat of arms in the Minster's great transept window is the nebuly coat of the title. When the new Lord Blandamer arrives, promising to pay all the costs of the restoration, Westray suspects that the new lord is not what he seems.

The Telegraph said the book "could strike the careless reader as no more than a curiosity, a bit of amateur work. Yet this would be a mistake."

== Background ==
A coat of arms with a 'nebuly' design of the kind referenced in the title.

The Nebuly Coat includes elements that were central interests in Falkner's life, church architecture and heraldry. The massive Romanesque arches of Cullerne Minster recall those of Durham Cathedral, with which Falkner was familiar through his work as Honorary Librarian to the Dean and Chapter as well as viewing it from his house on Palace Green. Jacques Heyman thinks that the plot was inspired by the collapse of the central tower of Chichester Cathedral in 1861.

== Publication history ==
- 1903 1st edition, Edward Arnold, London
- 1904 5th impression, Edward Arnold, London
- 1943 Penguin Books No 437
- 1954 Geoffrey Cumberlege / Oxford University Press (together with The Lost Stradivarius)
- 1983 Three Rivers Bks, ISBN 978-0-907951-05-6 and ISBN 978-0-907951-08-7
- 1988 Oxford University Press
- 1989 Oxford Paperbacks, ISBN 978-0-19-281612-2
- 2004 Ash-Tree Press, Ashcroft, British Columbia, ISBN 1-55310-073-5
- 2006 Steve Savage Publishers Limited ISBN 978-1-904246-22-0
- 2009 Athelstane Kindle Edition ASIN B0015YEQ1Y

== Productions ==
It was adapted for radio in the Story Time slot on the BBC Home Service by Thea Holme starting on 1 April 1965. It was produced by Brian Miller, and the organ was played by Edward Fry at St Monica's Chapel, Bristol. The actors were:

- Canon Parkyn: Eric Anderson
- Westray: Peter Marinker
- Dr Ennefer: Ronald Russell
- Sharnall: Peter Pratt
- Janaway: Robert Bashford
- Creole singer: Mollie Petrie
- Anastasia: Carol Marsh
- Miss Joliffe: Gladys Spencer
