= Angel Exit Theatre =

English theatre company

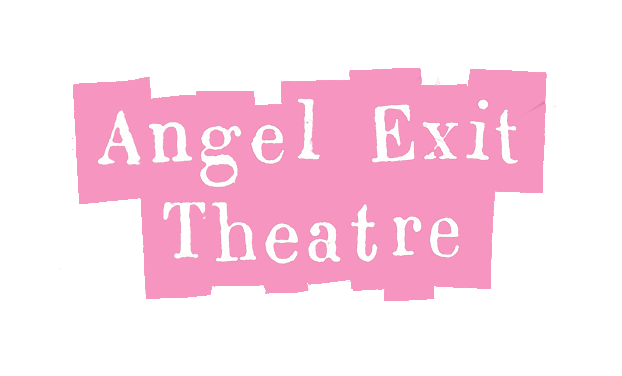
Angel Exit company logo

Angel Exit Theatre is a theatre company based in Winterbourne Abbas in Dorset, England, formed in 2001. The company was founded by Lecoq-trained actors Tamsin Fessey and Lyn Forbes.

== Productions ==
The Black Curtain (2008) explored the formulaic world of film noir, whilst Moonfleet, an adaptation of the J. Meade Faulkner novel toured the U.K in 2009 and 2010. The work was called "a gripping adventure story told by Angel Exit in their trademark physical theatre style" by Yorkshire Live. The Secret Garden, an adaptation of the Frances Hodgson Burnett children's novel was co-commissioned by Activate and Lighthouse Poole and co-produced by Bridport Arts Centre and Dorchester Arts and toured the UK from January to April 2012. Fessey commented that the production was "the biggest show we have done so far, in the fact that we are working with more people and have a lighting designer this time and puppetry...."
