= Holy Trinity Church, Fleet =

Church in Dorset, England

Holy Trinity Church
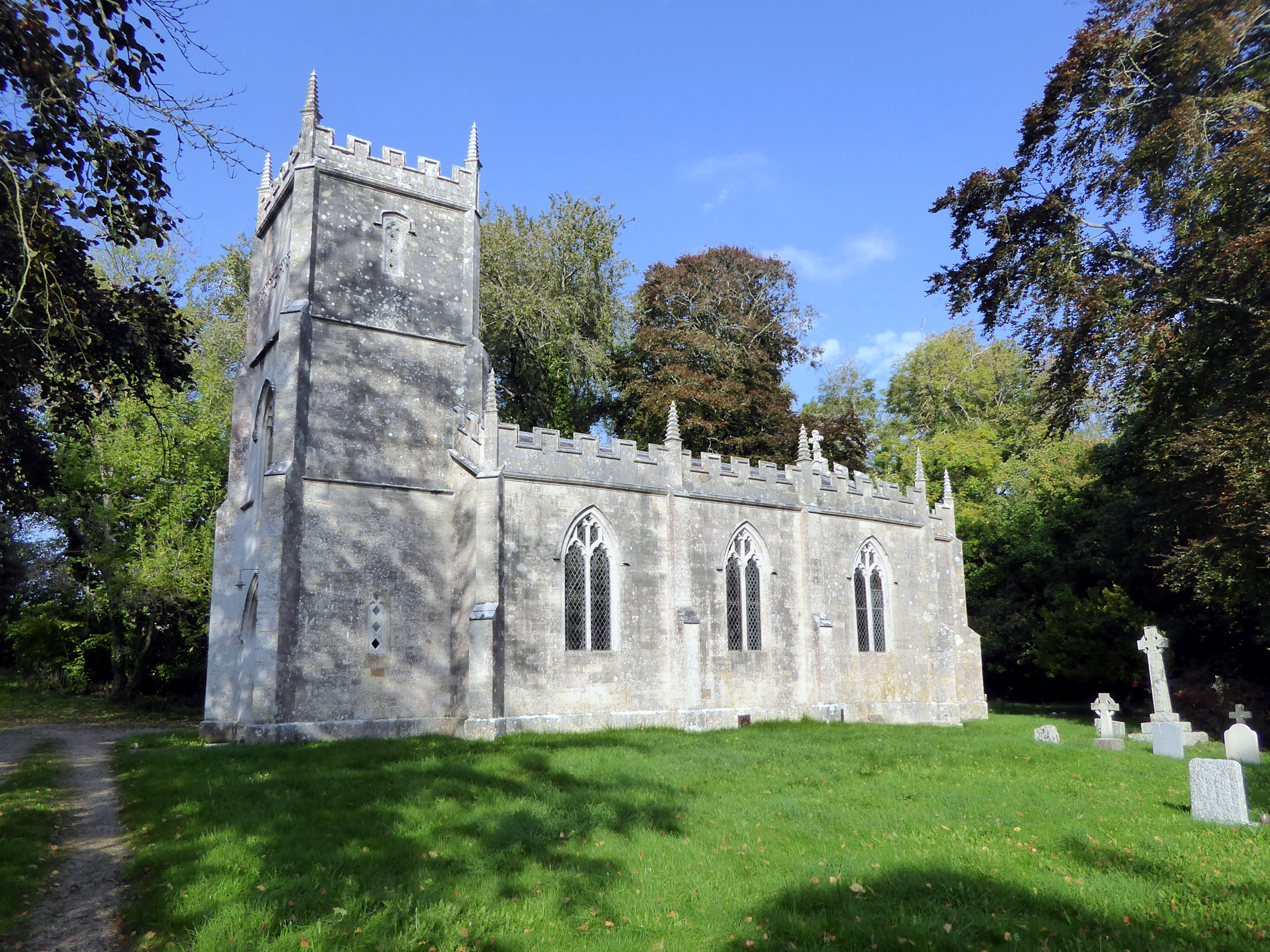
- Holy Trinity Church

Religion
- Affiliation: Church of England
- Year consecrated: 1829

Location
- Location: Fleet, Dorset, England
- Interactive map of Holy Trinity Church
- Coordinates: 50.6232°N 2.5189°W

Architecture
- Architect: Stickland of Dorchester
- Type: Church
- Completed: 1829

Holy Trinity Church is a Church of England church in Fleet, Dorset, England. It was built in 1827–29, replacing an earlier parish church which was partially destroyed during the Great Storm of 1824. Holy Trinity remains in religious use and has been Grade I Listed since 1956.

== History ==
Fleet's original church, along with much of the village, suffered considerable damage and destruction during the Great Storm of 1824. After waves broke through Chesil Beach, many of the village's residents were forced to retreat to nearby Chickerell. Once the storm had subsided, it was discovered that five dwellings had been destroyed, along with the nave of the parish church. In the aftermath, the Rector of Fleet, Rev. George Gould, of Fleet House, decided to have a new church built at his expense and plans were drawn up by Stickland of Dorchester. The chosen site of the new church was 540 yards inland from its predecessor. The foundation stone of the new church was laid by Rev. Gould on 25 April 1827. It was completed in 1829 and consecrated by the Bishop of Bristol, the Right Rev. Robert Gray, on 25 August 1829.

A new altar of oak was dedicated by the Bishop of Salisbury, the Right Rev. John Wordsworth, on 25 January 1891. It was gifted by Sir Henry Peto of Fleet House. In 1891–92, improvements were made to the church at the expense of Sir Henry Peto, in memory of his father, Sir Samuel Morton Peto, who died in 1889. The church was reseated in accordance to a suggestion made by Sir Samuel Morton Peto on his final visit to the area, with the teak and cedar woodwork of the original pews being preserved as much as possible. Other work included the alteration of the chancel arch, the replacement of the flooring with blocks of wood on concrete, as much of the original flooring had suffered from dry rot, and the installation of heating apparatus. The work took three months to carry out under the supervision of George Vialls of London, and the church was reopened in February 1892.

Today the church holds one service each month and is also used for weddings, funerals and other events. It is part of the circuit known as Chesil Churches.

== Architecture ==
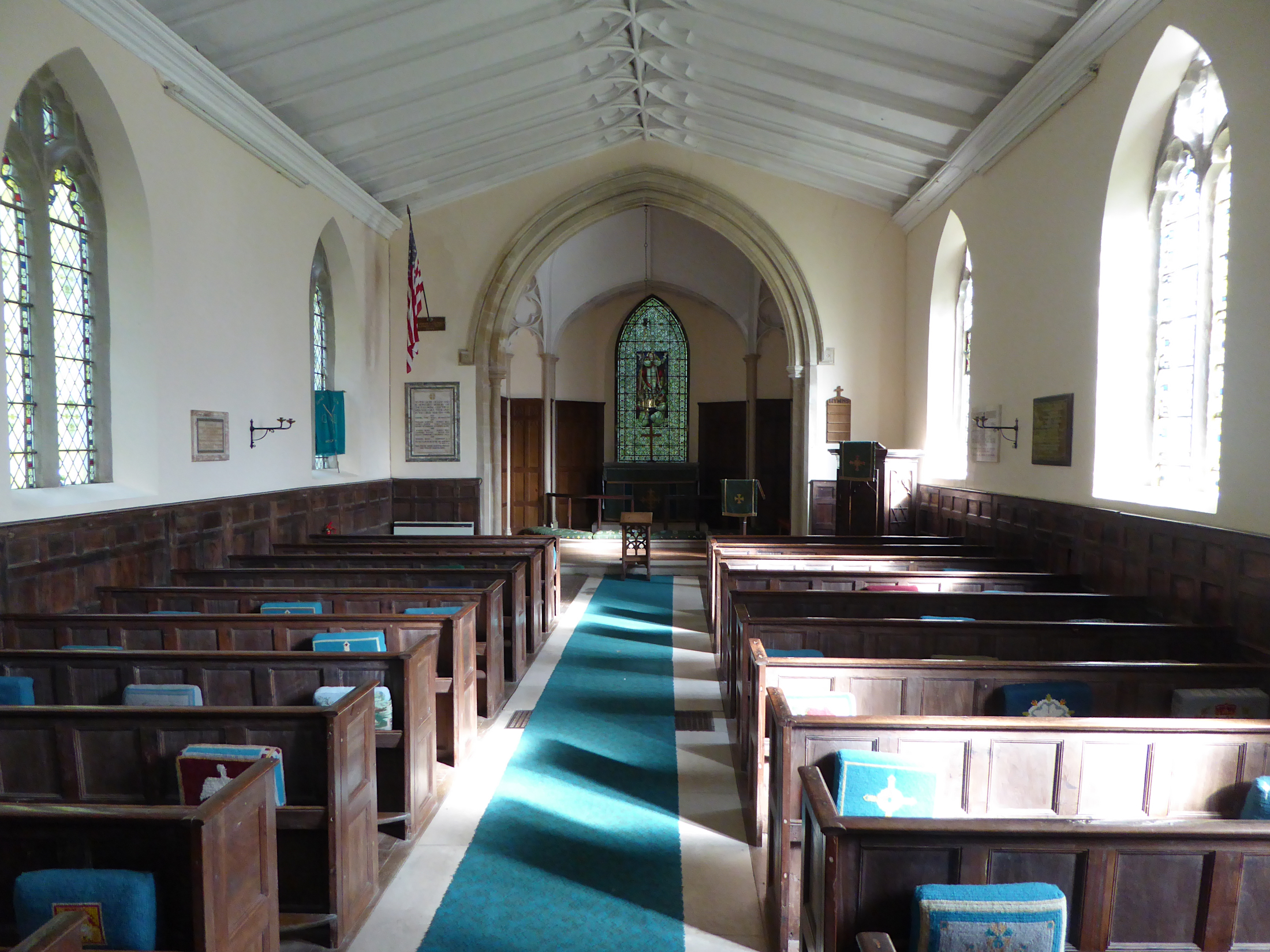
The interior of Holy Trinity Church.

The Gothic style church is built of ashlar stone with slate roofs. There is a west tower, nave, chancel and sanctuary. All of the windows contain painted glass; the east window, which depicts the Raising of the son of the widow of Nain, was painted by Mr. Stevenson of Bath.
