= Moseley Park School =

Coordinates: 52°34′33.03″N 2°4′18.33″W

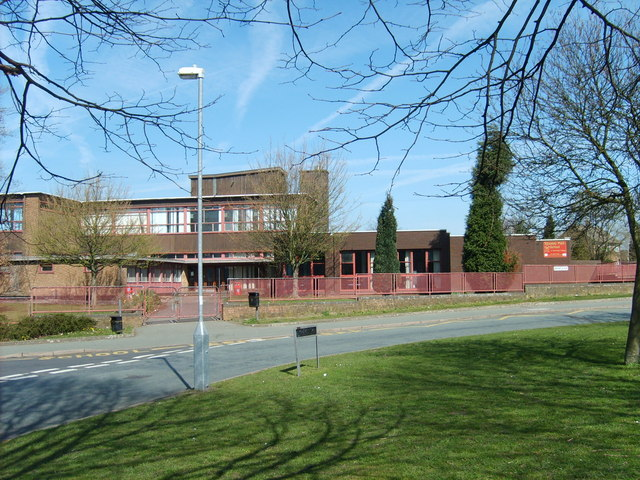

Location
- Holland Road; Bilston; Wolverhampton, West Midlands, WV14 6LU; England

Information
- Type: Academy
- Department for Education URN: 138098 Tables
- Ofsted: Reports
- Executive Headteacher: Georgetta Holloway
- Gender: Mixed
- Age: 11 to 18
- Enrolment: 728 as of April 2016
- Website: http://www.moseleypark.org/

Moseley Park School is a mixed secondary school and sixth form located in the Bilston area of Wolverhampton, West Midlands, England.

== Admissions ==
Moseley Park converted to academy status in June 2012, and was previously a community school under the direct control of Wolverhampton City Council with specialist Technology College status. The school continues to coordinate with Wolverhampton City Council for admissions.

Moseley Park offers GCSEs as programmes of study for pupils, while students in the sixth form have the option to study from a range of A-levels and BTECs. The sixth form provision is offered in conjunction with Heath Park School.

== History ==
=== Grammar school ===
Bilston Grammar School was a two-form entry grammar school built for the South East Divisional Executive of Staffordshire Education Committee in 1959. Bilston Grammar School had started in 1947. In 1966 it came under Wolverhampton Education Committee.

Bilston Girls' High School, formed in 1919, became a sixth form college, later part of Bilston Community College in 1983, which is now the Wellington Road Campus of the City of Wolverhampton College.

=== Comprehensive ===
In 1975 the school merged with Etheridge Secondary School (founded in 1937) to become Moseley Park Comprehensive.

== Notable former pupils ==
=== Bilston Grammar School ===
- Geoff Crudgington, goalkeeper
- Dee Palmer, formerly David Palmer the keyboardist of Jethro Tull (band)

=== Etheridge Secondary Modern School ===
- David Daker, television and film actor, often playing policemen
- Don Powell, drummer for Slade
