= Morna Stuart =

Deceased author (born 1905)

Morna Stuart (1905 – 1972) was a writer of several plays and books. Her best-known work today is Marassa and Midnight, a young-adult novel that tells the story of twin boys from Haiti separated during the French Revolution. During her lifetime, however, she received the most publicity for her play Traitor's Gate, a work on the life of Thomas More.

== Biography ==
Information on Stuart's life is sparse. She was born in Nainital, Kumaon, India in 1905 and attended St. Michael's School and St Anne's College (both in Oxford). Her first book, The Children of Aries, was published under the pseudonym C.J. Campbell in 1925. Between 1937 and 1962 Stuart was a teacher as well as a scriptwriter for the BBC. She served as a warden for the Civil Defence Service from 1942 to 1945. She was an Incident Officers Clerk for the Belgravia Relief Control Team in 1943 and for Flying Squad in 1944.

== Works ==
Stuart is listed as a writer for 72 plays, screenplay adaptations, and lectures on literature, that aired on either television or radio for the BBC from March 1937 through May 1967. The topics of these programs included literary interpretations of historical figures (Thomas Paycocke, St. Francis of Assisi), adaptations of novels (Cry, the Beloved Country, Moonfleet), and lectures on the Pickwick Papers and the Bayeux Tapestry.

Marassa and Midnight, written in 1966 and published in 1968, is the story of two twins from Haiti separated during the French and Haitian revolutions. Kirkus Reviews found the title characters to be "magnificent", but opined that the story itself was "not strong enough to sustain them". Stuart dedicated the book to Harry Lockwood West, a British actor.

Traitor's Gate was produced at the Duke of York's Theatre in London. In a modern critique of reviews of the time, Maggie Gale states that it was criticized for taking "liberties with the facts" while simultaneously being lauded for its "theatrical value". The play was adapted into a TV movie in 1939, starring Margaretta Scott and Basil Sydney, and was translated into Indonesian in 1968.

Stuart's other works include the books Till She Stoop (1935) and Nightrider (1934), as well as Michaelangelo's Confession of Faith, a poem set to music by William H Harris (1935). Other works include the plays Mesmer: A fantasy based on the legend of Franz Anton Mesmer (1946) and The Masque of the King's Making (1949). The latter was written specially for a festival held in October 1949 in honor of Alfred the Great and was performed by the College Dramatic Society of King's College, Taunton.

== Personal life ==
Stuart married Montagu Richmond Nicholas in Jul-Sep 1927 in Brixworth, Northamptonshire. He was a barrister and then a judge in the civil court of London. They had one son Oliver Richmond Nicholas born 1928.

In 1962 they visited Haiti so that she could gather material about the period of the Haitian Revolution for her book Marassa and Midnight.
