= Moonfleet (film) =

1954 film by Fritz Lang

- Directed by: Fritz Lang
- Written by: Jan Lustig; Margaret Fitts
- Based on: Moonfleet; 1898 novel by J. Meade Falkner
- Produced by: John Houseman
- Starring: Stewart Granger; George Sanders; Joan Greenwood; Viveca Lindfors
- Cinematography: Robert H. Planck
- Edited by: Albert Akst
- Music by: Miklós Rózsa; Vicente Gómez (flamenco music)
- Distributed by: MGM
- Release dates: June 24, 1955 (U.S.); 1960 (France)
- Running time: 87 minutes
- Language: English
- Budget: $1,955,000
- Box office: $1,574,000

Moonfleet is a 1955 Eastman Color swashbuckler film shot in CinemaScope directed by Fritz Lang. It was inspired by the 1898 novel Moonfleet by J. Meade Falkner, although significant alterations were made in the characters and plot.

== Plot ==
A gothic melodrama set in England during the 18th century, the film is about John Mohune (Jon Whiteley), a young orphan who is sent to the Dorset village of Moonfleet to stay with his mother's former lover, Jeremy Fox (Stewart Granger). Fox is a morally ambiguous character, an elegant gentleman intimately involved with smugglers. On the run from the law, Mohune and Fox must decipher a coded message in their pursuit of a fabulous diamond hidden long ago.

== Cast ==
- Stewart Granger as Jeremy Fox
- George Sanders as Lord James Ashwood
- Joan Greenwood as Lady Clarista Ashwood
- Viveca Lindfors as Mrs. Minton
- Jon Whiteley as John Mohune
- Liliane Montevecchi as Gypsy
- Melville Cooper as Felix Ratsey
- Sean McClory as Elzevir Block
- Alan Napier as Parson Glennie
- John Hoyt as Magistrate Maskew
- Donna Corcoran as Grace
- Jack Elam as Damen
- Gordon Richards as Marling
- Skelton Knaggs as Jacob

== Production ==
The book was published in England in 1898 but not published in the US until 1951. Reviews were excellent.

MGM bought the film rights and announced Stewart Granger as the star immediately. William Wright was originally going to produce.

Then the job of producing went to John Houseman. Houseman later recalled, "the novel was written back about 1890, was as successful as Treasure Island had been, and then was totally forgotten. The man [J. Meade Falkner] never wrote anything else. It was a grim story, a realistic adventure story about pirates and a little boy who accidentally got himself involved with them. There was no sex. But then we began to have fun with it, and embroider it."

At one stage Merle Oberon was going to be the female lead. Eventually Joan Greenwood was brought over from England.

In October 1953 the film was officially put on MGM's schedule.

=== Shooting ===
Filming took place in September 1954. "We are trying to make it one of the best of its type", said Houseman.

Director Fritz Lang said the story "calls for mood, for atmosphere. The smugglers work in the dark, on hazy days. I plan to light my principals just as you would in a play, dropping shadows on the sides of the stage to concentrate on the main action and the players involved in it."

The movie was shot almost entirely on the MGM backlot, augmented by a few shots of the California coast. During filming, James Dean visited the set; Stewart Granger said his manner was rude and dismissive.

Houseman said, "I got along fine with Fritz Lang, even though we screamed and yelled at each other. But he was very anxious to make a picture at Metro, and he rather wanted to make a picture with me. On the whole, we managed to turn out something very much off the beaten track-and... we had a good time."

Granger later said : "I hated working with Fritz Lang – he was a Kraut and it was a bloody awful film. I wanted to produce and act it in Cornwall and made them buy the book. MGM turned it into a big colour film. Moonfleet was not Lang's type of film – it is a romantic child's film. It wasn't a bad part."

Houseman says one time during filming his associate producer, Jud Kinberg, "came down to the stage and heard this awful caterwauling. As he got near he heard: [German accent] "You are not a professional! We pay you a lot of money to be a professional actor, and it seems to me you are stupid, you are lazy, you are nothing at all...!" Jud came around the corner, and saw that the recipient of this was a little boy of eleven!" The little boy being referred to was obviously Jon Whiteley, as he was the only boy actor in the film. But Jon was only nine years old during the filming and not eleven.

== Reception ==
Houseman later said, "It ended up being rather a crazy type of picture – still much admired by European filmmakers – but, commercially, it was a disaster."

The film was a critical and financial failure on release. According to MGM records the movie earned $567,000 in the US and Canada and $1,007,000 overseas. It made a loss of $1,203,000.

The film was released in France in 1960 and had 917,219 admissions.

The prestigious French film publication Cahiers du Cinéma named Moonfleet as one of the 100 most essential films ever made, listing it at #32.

== See also ==
- List of American films of 1955
- Moonfleet & Other Stories, an album by Chris de Burgh based on the novel
