= Margaret Fitts =

American screenwriter

- Born: Margaret Freeman Fitts; November 15, 1923; Los Angeles, California, USA
- Died: July 17, 2011 (aged 87); Rancho Santa Fe, California, USA
- Education: Westlake School for Girls; Stanford University
- Occupation(s): Screenwriter, TV writer
- Spouse: Francis Marion Scott III

Margaret "Peggy" Fitts (November 15, 1923 – July 17, 2011) was an American screenwriter and television writer active from the 1940s through the 1960s.

== Biography ==
Margaret was the daughter of L. Nathaniel and Eleanor Fitts, and she was born and raised in Los Angeles, where she attended the Westlake School. She later graduated from Stanford University, and afterward, she began writing films at MGM. She married Capitol Records executive Francis Marion Scott III in 1953. She wrote a string of films between 1949 and 1956, and mostly concentrated on TV writing through the 1960s.

== Selected filmography ==
- The King and Four Queens (1956)
- Moonfleet (1955)
- City Story (1954)
- Talk About a Stranger (1952)
- Stars in My Crown (1950)
- The Sun Comes Up (1949)
