= The King and Four Queens =

1956 film by Raoul Walsh

- Theatrical release poster
- Directed by: Raoul Walsh
- Screenplay by: Margaret Fitts; Richard Alan Simmons
- Produced by: David Hempstead; Clark Gable
- Starring: Clark Gable; Eleanor Parker; Barbara Nichols; Jo Van Fleet
- Cinematography: Lucien Ballard
- Edited by: David Bretherton; Louis R. Loeffler
- Music by: Alex North
- Production company: GABCO
- Distributed by: United Artists
- Release date: December 26, 1956
- Running time: 86 minutes
- Country: United States
- Language: English
- Box office: $2.25 million

The King and Four Queens is a 1956 American western adventure comedy mystery film starring Clark Gable as adventurer Dan Kehoe and Eleanor Parker as wife/widow Sabina McDade. It was filmed on location in CinemaScope. Directed by Raoul Walsh, the film is based on a story written by Margaret Fitts, who also wrote the screenplay along with Richard Alan Simmons. This film was the first (and last) project from Clark Gable's own production company, GABCO. His partners in the project were movie star Jane Russell and her husband, Bob Waterfield, owners of Russ-Field Productions, and the film is often listed as a Russ-Field-GABCO production.

== Plot ==
The story involves a middle-aged cowboy adventurer who learns that a stolen fortune remains buried on a ranch that serves as home to four gorgeous young widows and their battle-axe mother-in-law. The drifter turns on the charm to find the money.

Dan Kehoe, escaping from a posse, finds his way to a small frontier town. In the saloon, he learns of a nearby town, Wagon Mound, that has been deserted, except for one family: the McDades. Some time ago, the four outlaw McDade sons had returned with the loot from a robbery, but were followed, and were trapped in a burning barn. However, only three burned bodies were recovered from the wreckage of the barn; nobody knows which of the four may have survived, or where their $100,000 in gold is hidden. While treasure-hunters are interested, they are shot at if they approach.

Pretending to be escaping pursuers, Kehoe approaches the McDades, and is shot and slightly wounded. The McDade women, who prove to be the brothers' mother and wives, take him in and bandage him. The presence of a man in their midst provokes the younger women to look to their appearance, but their mother-in-law angrily points out that one of them is still married, and until it is determined which one it is, they must all act married. She also insists that Kehoe must leave the next day. Kehoe tells Ma McDade a story suggesting that he may have met the surviving son in jail, but did not see him well enough to identify him. This piques her interest. Over the course of the next day, all four of the widows are varyingly flirtatious with Kehoe, who learns that the mother keeps a constant lookout for a signal from her surviving son, and will ring the large bell to let him know when it is safe to approach town.

The sheriff arrives with a posse, intending to seize Kehoe, who talks him out of it by agreeing to signal when the last McDade brother arrives by ringing the bell. Ma McDade is sufficiently taken by Kehoe's persuading the sheriff not to arrest him that she allows him to stay a little longer. He seeks to befriend each of the widows enough to learn where the loot might be hidden, but Ma keeps interfering. In time, Kehoe leaves, but as Ma learns, he has figured out where the loot is and has taken it. It also turns out that Sabina McDade was never married to her "husband" (she only pretended to be to get the loot), and is free to leave with him. However, the sheriff's posse discovers them, so Kehoe sends her ahead with $5,000 of the loot and returns the rest to the sheriff, pretending that that was his intention. Arriving at the agreed-upon meeting place, Kehoe learns that Sabina has pretended to be his widow and taken all his money. Chasing her, he finds her waiting with the money and they decide to travel together.

== Cast ==
- Clark Gable as Dan Kehoe
- Eleanor Parker as Sabina McDade
- Jean Willes as Ruby McDade
- Barbara Nichols as Birdie McDade
- Sara Shane as Oralie McDade
- Jo Van Fleet as Ma McDade
- Roy Roberts as Sheriff Tom Larrabee
- Arthur Shields as Padre
- Jay C. Flippen as Bartender of Rosebud Saloon in Touchstone
- Florenz Ames as Josiah Sweet, Undertaker
- Chuck Roberson as Posseman

== Production notes ==
At Clark Gable's request, the film was shot on location in southern Utah because he was familiar with the area, having hunted there for years. Footage was shot near St. George, Utah, in Snow Canyon State Park and at the Santa Clara River. Additional footage was shot in Calabasas, California.

== Book version ==
In 1956, Theodore Sturgeon novelized the original screen story by Margaret Fitts for Dell Books, which published it in December 1956 as a 25-cent paperback.

== See also ==
- List of American films of 1956
