= Villains (British TV series) =

1972 British TV crime drama series

- Genre: Crime
- Country of origin: United Kingdom
- No. of episodes: 13

Production
- Running time: 50 minutes
- Production company: London Weekend Television

Original release
- Network: ITV
- Release: 20 July – 12 October 1972

Villains is a crime drama series, shown in the UK in 1972, following the linked fates of nine bank robbers, led by George (David Daker). It begins with the nine men meeting in prison during their appeal and traces each individual after the group escape from custody. The series also starred William Marlowe, Bob Hoskins and Martin Shaw.

== Episodes ==
No.	Title	Directed by	Written by	Original release date
1	"George"	Tony Wharmby	Ray Jenkins	22 July 1972
2	"His Dad Named Him After the General"	Tony Wharmby	Ray Jenkins	29 July 1972
3	"Commander"	Derek Bennett	Robert Holles	5 August 1972
4	"Chas"	Jim Goddard	Peter Hammond	12 August 1972
5	"Alice Sheree"	Jim Goddard	Keith Dewhurst	19 August 1972
6	"Sand Dancer"	Robert Tronson	Andrew Brown	26 August 1972
7	"Belinda"	Tony Wharmby	John Bowen	2 September 1972
8	"Move In, Move On"	Robert Tronson	Robin Chapman	9 September 1972
9	"Knocker"	Tony Wharmby	Robin Chapman	15 September 1972
10	"Bernie"	Robert Tronson	Tony Hoare	22 September 1972
11	"Smudger"	Jim Goddard	Jonathan Hales	29 September 1972
12	"Grass"	Tony Wharmby	Ray Jenkins	7 October 1972
13	"Billy Boy"	Robert Tronson	Andrew Brown	14 October 1972

== DVD release ==
The complete series was released on DVD by Network DVD in August 2012.
