= Talk About a Stranger =

1952 film directed by David Bradley

- Theatrical release poster
- Directed by: David Bradley
- Screenplay by: Margaret Fitts
- Based on: a story by Charlotte Armstrong
- Produced by: Richard Goldstone
- Starring: George Murphy; Nancy Davis; Billy Gray; Lewis Stone; Kurt Kasznar
- Cinematography: John Alton, a.s.c.
- Edited by: Newell P. Kimlin
- Music by: David Buttolph
- Distributed by: Metro-Goldwyn-Mayer
- Release date: April 18, 1952 (United States)
- Running time: 65 minutes
- Country: United States
- Language: English
- Budget: $481,000
- Box office: $375,000

Talk About a Stranger is a 1952 American film noir directed by David Bradley and starring George Murphy, Nancy Davis and Billy Gray. It was shot by noted cinematographer John Alton, A.S.C. and was based on Charlotte Armstrong's short story "The Enemy". This had been published in the May 1951 issue of Ellery Queen's Mystery Magazine and was subsequently chosen for the top prize in the Mystery Magazine's yearly selection of best stories.

== Plot ==
On Halloween night, Bud Fontaine Jr. and his friends break a window at a seemingly abandoned house. They run when an older man who steps outside the door and glares at them. Bud explains to his father Robert what had happened. Bud's father explains their new neighbor is Dr. Paul Mahler, whom he hasn't met. He goes over and offers to repair the damage. The neighbor introduces himself as "Matlock", and refuses his offer.

The next morning, Bud sells newspaper subscriptions and befriends a stray dog, whom he names "Boy". He arrives at Matlock's house to sell him a subscription, but Matlock refuses. Boy runs into the house and knocks over a stand. Bud retrieves Boy and runs out. He returns home, and his parents let him keep the dog.

A day later, Bud brings Boy as he accompanies his father to deposit used heating oil for their orchard farm. As they drive back home, Matlock's car nearly runs over Boy, which Bud feels was deliberate. Bud's mother Marge tells her son he has been invited to a birthday party. As he shops for a birthday gift, Bud leaves Boy at home and instead buys a dog license. When Bud returns, he searches for Boy and finds him poisoned, outside of Matlock's house.

After Bud tells his father what had happened, Robert confronts Matlock, who denies the charge. Bud tries to report the crime to the police station and have Mr. Wardlaw, a newspaper owner, publish the story. However, Wardlaw tells Bud he needs to find proof for his accusations.

At a grocery store, Bud learns that Matlock purchased rat poison with his valuable gold watch. He then sneaks into Matlock's garage and finds an opened box of rat poison and a vehicle registration belonging to Mahler. Back in his office, Wardlaw tries to phone the address but finds the number has been disconnected. He tells Bud to return the evidence back to Matlock, without him noticing.

Instead, Bud hitchhikes to Mahler's address and finds it is an abandoned beach house. By nightfall, Bud hitches a motorcycle ride back home, where his parents are upset that he left. Bud's father orders him to his room, but later consoles him. Bud however sneaks out to return the registration but is caught by Matlock, who screams at him. Furious at Matlock, Bud destroys the spout for the oil tank, causing gallons of oil to spill out.

Back at home, Robert and the local farmers are concerned about the lack of heating oil needed to protect the orchards for the winter. When Marge suggests asking Matlock for oil, Bud follows his father and the farmers. There, Bud shouts he had emptied the tank because he hates Matlock.

When the farmers leave, Matlock lunges at Bud, who then jumps into a nearby lake. Matlock rescues Bud and feeds him soup at his house. He tells Bud he did not poison his dog. As Matlock returns Bud home, a fuel tank truck arrives. When Bud returns home, Wardlaw greets Matlock as "Dr. Mahler" and reunites him with his estranged wife, Dorothy. Mahler explains that his gravely ill son needed an operation but died during surgery. Mahler blamed himself and left his wife.

The next day, Bud arrives at Wardlaw's office; there Mr. Wetzell, a farmer, admits he accidentally killed Boy as he had left poisoned meat for the coyotes. Bud forgives him, and as he rides back home, the Mahlers hand him a new puppy named "Rex". Bud thanks the Mahlers and rides off.

== Cast ==
- George Murphy as Robert Fontaine Sr.
- Nancy Davis as Marge Fontaine
- Billy Gray as Robert 'Bud' Fontaine Jr.
- Lewis Stone as William J. Wardlaw
- Kurt Kasznar as Dr. Paul Mahler, alias Matlock
- Anna Glomb as Camille Wardlaw
- Burt Mustin as Mr. McEley

== Reception ==
According to MGM records, Talk About a Stranger earned $278,000 in the U.S. and Canada and $97,000 elsewhere resulting in a loss of $276,000.
