= Heath Park School =

Coordinates: 52.6013°N 2.0995°W

Location
- Prestwood Road; Heath Town; Wolverhampton, West Midlands, WV11 1RD; England

Information
- Type: Academy
- Local authority: Wolverhampton City Council
- Department for Education URN: 137730 Tables
- Ofsted: Reports
- Headteacher: Georgetta Holloway
- Gender: Mixed
- Age: 11 to 18
- Enrolment: 1,179 as of April 2016
- Website: http://www.heathpark.net/

Heath Park School (known as 'Heath Park') is a mixed secondary school and sixth form located in the Heath Town area of Wolverhampton in the West Midlands of England.

Previously a community school administered by Wolverhampton City Council, Heath Park converted to academy status in December 2011. However the school continues to coordinate with Wolverhampton City Council for admissions.

Heath Park offers GCSEs as programmes of study for pupils, while students in the sixth form have the option to study from a range of A-levels and BTECs. The sixth form provision is offered in conjunction with Moseley Park School.
