= Moonfleet (novel) =

1898 novel by J. Meade Falkner

- First edition
- Author: J. Meade Falkner
- Language: English
- Genre: Adventure novel, Historical novel
- Publisher: Edward Arnold
- Publication date: 1898
- Publication place: United Kingdom
- Media type: Print (hardback & paperback)
- Pages: 305 (+ 32 ads)

Moonfleet is an 1898 adventure and historical novel written by English writer J. Meade Falkner. The plot is an adventure tale of smuggling, treasure, and shipwreck set in 18th-century England.

== Plot summary ==
In 1757 Moonfleet is a small village along the coast of southern England. The village takes its name from a formerly prominent local family, the Mohunes. The main character is John Trenchard, an orphan who lives with his aunt, Miss Jane Arnold. The village church includes the sexton, Mr. Ratsey, and Parson Glennie, who also teaches in the village school. Elzevir Block is the landlord of the Mohune Arms. The inn is nicknamed the Why Not?, a pun on the Mohune coat of arms, which includes a cross-pall in the shape of the letter "Y". Mr. Maskew is the local magistrate, who has a daughter, Grace. Village legend tells of the notorious Colonel John "Blackbeard" Mohune who is buried in the family crypt under the church. He is reputed to have stolen a diamond from King Charles I and hidden it. His ghost is said to wander at night looking for it and the mysterious lights in the churchyard are attributed to his activities.

As the main part of the story opens, Block's youthful son, David, has just been killed by Maskew during a raid by the Maskew and other authorities on a smuggling boat. One night a bad storm hits the village and there is a flood. While attending the Sunday service at church, John hears strange sounds from the crypt below. He thinks it is the sound of the coffins of the Mohune family. The next day, he finds Elzevir and Ratsey against the south wall of the church. They claim to be checking for damage from the storm, but John suspects they are searching for Blackbeard's ghost.

Later John finds a large sinkhole has opened in the ground by a grave. He follows the passage and finds himself in the crypt with coffins on shelves and casks on the floor. He realises his friends are smugglers and this is their hiding place. He has to hide behind a coffin when he hears Ratsey and Elzevir coming. When they leave, they fill in the hole, inadvertently trapping him. John finds a locket in the coffin that he hid behind (it turns out to be that of Blackbeard himself) which holds a piece of paper with verses from the Bible. John eventually passes out after drinking too much of the wine while trying to quench his thirst, having not eaten or drunk for over 24 hours. Later he wakes up in the Why Not? inn – he has been rescued by Elzevir and Ratsey. When he is better, he returns to his aunt's house, but she, suspecting him of drunken behaviour, throws him out. Elzevir takes him in.

When Block's lease on the Why Not? comes up for renewal, Maskew bids against him in the auction and wins. Block must leave the inn and Moonfleet but plans one last smuggling venture. John feels honour-bound to go with him, and visits Grace Maskew, whom he loves and has been seeing in secret, to say goodbye; his aunt gives him his mother's prayer book — her last hope to influence John towards piety. The excisemen and Maskew are aware of the planned smuggling run but do not know exactly where it will occur. During the landing Maskew appears and is caught by the smugglers. Elzevir is bent on vengeance for his son by killing Maskew, and while the rest land the cargo and leave, he and John keep watch over Maskew. Just as Block prepares to shoot Maskew the excisemen attack. They wound John and unintentionally kill Maskew. Block carries John away to safety and they hide in some old quarries. While there, John inadvertently finds out that the verses from Blackbeard's locket contain a code that will reveal the location of his famous diamond.

Once John's wound heals, he and Block decide to recover the diamond from Carisbrooke Castle. After a suspenseful scene in the well where the jewel is hidden, they succeed in escaping to Holland where they try to sell it to a diamond merchant named Krispijn Aldobrand. The merchant cheats them, claiming the diamond is fake. Elzevir falls for the deceit and angrily throws the diamond out of the window. John, however, knows they have been duped, and suggests they try to recover the diamond through burglary. The attempt fails and they are arrested and sentenced to prison. John curses the merchant for his lies.

John and Elzevir go to prison for life. Eventually they are separated. Then, unexpectedly, ten years later, their paths cross again. They are being transported, and board a ship. A storm blows up, and by a strong coincidence, the ship is wrecked upon Moonfleet beach. While trying to reach the beach Elzevir helps John to safety, but is himself dragged under by the surf and drowned.

John arrives where he originally started, in the Why Not?, and is reunited with Ratsey. He is also reunited with Grace. She is now a rich young lady, having inherited her father's money. However, she is still in love with John. John tells her about the diamond and his life in prison. He regrets having lost everything, but she says, rich or not, she loves him.

Then Parson Glennie visits and reveals he had received a letter from Aldobrand. The merchant, suffering a guilty conscience and in an attempt to make amends, had bequeathed the worth of the diamond to John.

John gives the money to the village, and new almshouses are built, and the school and the church renovated. John marries Grace and becomes Lord of the Manor and Justice of the Peace. They have three children, including their first-born son, Elzevir. The children grow up, the sons going away to "serve King George on sea and land" while their daughter too, it seems, has married away. But John and Grace themselves do not leave their beloved Moonfleet ever again.

=== Backgammon ===
The narrative features multiple references to backgammon, which is played by the patrons of the Why Not? on an antique board bearing the Latin inscription Ita in vita ut in lusu aleae pessima jactura arte corrigenda est (translated in the book as As in life, so in a game of hazard, skill will make something of the worst of throws).

== Literary significance ==
Moonfleet is considered to be a classic work of fiction, and continues to be published in series such as Dover Children's Evergreen Classics.

Its popularity among children worldwide continued up until at least the 1970s, primarily as a result of its adventure themes relating to pirates, treasure, and smuggling, and due to its suspenseful story-line. It has frequently been studied in schools, and used as required reading for some English courses. It is often compared with similar novels like Stevenson's Treasure Island.

== Geography of the book ==
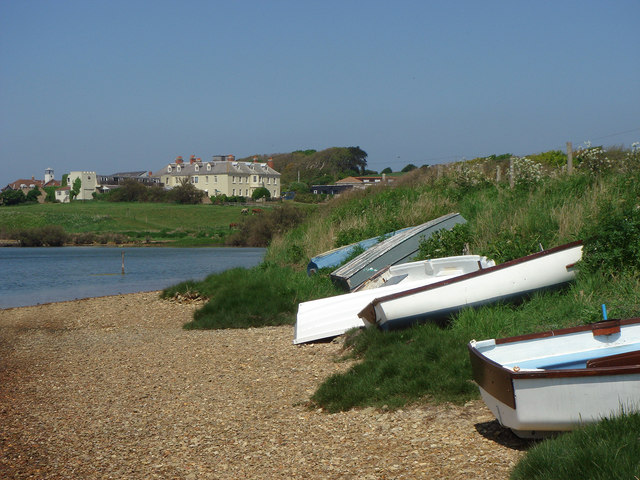
The Moonfleet Manor Hotel, Dorset

Falkner uses the local geography of Dorset and the Isle of Wight in the book, only changing some of the place names. The village of Moonfleet is based on East Fleet in Dorset by Chesil Beach. The headland in the book called The Snout is Portland Bill.

Corfe Castle and Carisbrooke Castle are key plot locations.

== Adaptations in other media ==
=== TV and film ===
- The book was filmed by Fritz Lang in 1955 and released under the same name, with a screenplay adapted by Jan Lustig from the novel. A handful of scenes from the book survived, including John's ordeal in the church crypt with the remains of Blackbeard (here renamed Redbeard), and his descent into the well to retrieve the diamond, but the movie altered the novel's plot substantially. Among other major changes, its young hero was given the newly invented rogue gentleman Jeremy Fox for a mentor (played by Stewart Granger), while the role of the working class Elzevir Block was reduced to leading a group of the smugglers seeking to kill John. Lang's film has enjoyed some cachet among French film critics. The adaptation also starred George Sanders, Joan Greenwood and Viveca Lindfors.
- In 1964 the BBC produced a six-episode TV adaptation under the title Smuggler's Bay, starring future Doctor Who actors Frazer Hines and Patrick Troughton as John Trenchard and Ratsey respectively. It began on BBC1 on 12 July 1964. No recordings of this production are known to exist.
- In 1984 a TV mini-series Moonfleet was filmed, starring Adam Godley and David Daker.
- Sky1 filmed Moonfleet a two-part TV adaptation in Ireland in 2013 starring Ray Winstone, Aneurin Barnard and Sophie Cookson. This was aired on 28 and 29 December 2013 Though more of the plot of the book remains than in the 1955 film, it still bears little relation; John is in his mid-twenties, Maskew has become an aristocrat and a tyrannical descendant of Blackbeard, and Elzevir Block the leader of a brothel-frequenting, knife-fighting band of gangsters.

=== Theatre and music ===
- Angel Exit Theatre company devised a production which toured the UK in 2009.
- In 2010 Chris de Burgh released an album of songs called Moonfleet & Other Stories featuring a story based on the book.
- In 2017 the Salisbury Playhouse announced a major new musical adaptation of Moonfleet with book and lyrics by Gareth Machin and music by Russell Hepplewhite. The show ran from 19 April to 5 May 2018.

=== Radio ===
- In 1963 the BBC aired a five-episode radio series of Moonfleet adapted by Morna Stuart and produced by Brandon Acton-Bond.
- A 90-minute BBC radio version was first broadcast in 1998 on BBC Radio Four, and starred Richard Pearce as John Trenchard, along with Robert Glenister and James Laurenson.
- The Colonial Radio Theatre on the Air released a 300-minute production of the book in May 2009, starring Jerry Robbins, David Ault, and Rob Cattell. It was dramatised by Deniz Cordell, and produced by M. J. Cogburn.
