= The Ghost Ship =

1943 film by Mark Robson

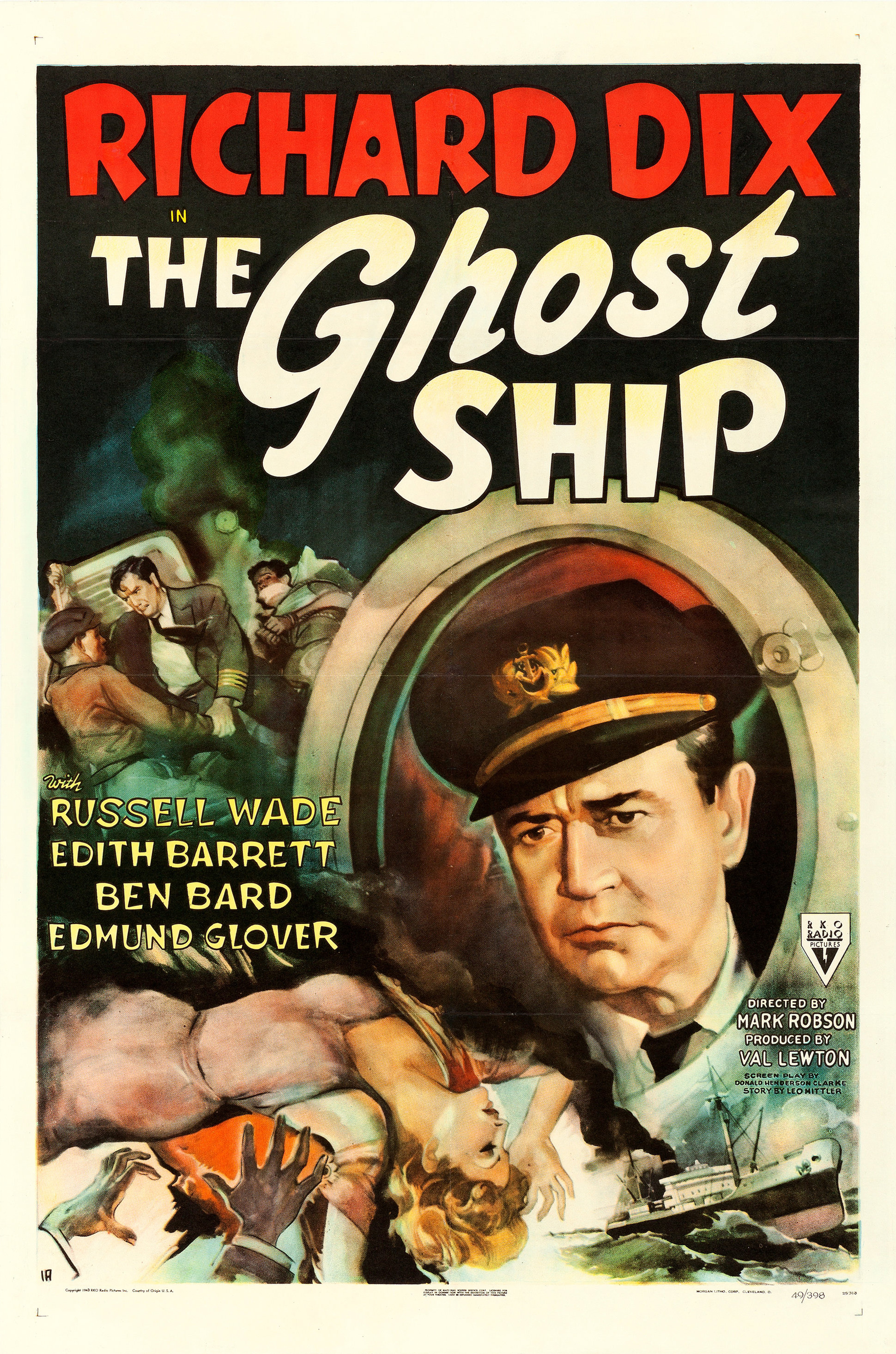
- Theatrical release poster by William Rose
- Directed by: Mark Robson
- Screenplay by: Donald Henderson Clarke
- Story by: Leo Mittler
- Produced by: Val Lewton
- Starring: Richard Dix
- Cinematography: Nicholas Musuraca
- Edited by: John Lockert
- Music by: Roy Webb
- Production company: RKO Radio Pictures
- Release date: December 24, 1943 (US)
- Running time: 69 minutes
- Country: United States
- Language: English
- Budget: $150,000

The Ghost Ship is a 1943 American black-and-white psychological thriller film starring Richard Dix and directed by Mark Robson. It was produced by Val Lewton for RKO Radio Pictures as part of a series of low-budget horror films. The film can be seen as a "low-key psychological thriller", a "suspense drama", and a "waterlogged melodrama". Russell Wade, Edith Barrett, Ben Bard and Edmund Glover appear in support.

The film is about a young merchant marine officer who begins to suspect that his ship's captain is mentally unbalanced and endangering the lives of the ship's crew. The ship's crew, however, believes the vessel to be haunted and cursed and several mysterious deaths occur.

Upon its theatrical release on Christmas Eve, 1943, the film was a box office success but received a mixed critical reception. In February 1944, Lewton was sued for plagiarism by playwrights Samuel R. Golding and Norbert Faulkner, who claimed that the script was based on a play that was submitted to Lewton for a possible film. Because of the suit, The Ghost Ship was withdrawn from theatrical release and not shown for nearly 50 years. It was not until the film's copyright was not renewed and it entered the public domain in the 1990s, that it began to be available again, and was released as part of the Val Lewton Horror Collection DVD set in 2005.

== Plot ==
Tom Merriam (Russell Wade), a young merchant marine officer, joins the crew of the ship Altair. At first, all seems well and Merriam bonds with the captain, Will Stone (Richard Dix). The ship, already shorthanded due to the death of a crew member before it left port, almost loses another ("the Greek") when he develops appendicitis. Taking direction over the ship's radio, the captain is to perform the appendectomy, but he is unable to make the incision. Instead, Merriam successfully removes the sailor's appendix, but – feeling he should be loyal to the captain and spare him embarrassment – swears the radio operator to secrecy. Afterward, the captain has a self-serving explanation for his failure.

One of the crew, Louie, tells the captain he should pull into port and take on new crew. Shortly after the captain closes the hatch to the chain locker. Louie is inside, and crushed to death by the chain. Merriam believes that Captain Stone, who is obsessed with authority, did it intentionally. When they dock at the fictional Caribbean island of "San Sebastian" Merriam attempts to expose the Captain's madness at a board of inquiry. The crew all speak favorably of the captain, including the Greek, who credits the captain with saving his life. Merriam states his intention to leave the Altair.

After the inquiry, the captain admits to a female friend (Edith Barrett) that he fears he is losing his mind. Soon after, Merriam is involved in a fight in port and knocked unconscious. One of his former shipmates – unaware that he has left the Altair – brings the unconscious man back aboard ship before the vessel departs. Merriam wakes up on the ship and fears that the pathologically insane Captain Stone may now attempt to kill him.

Merriam, scorned by the crew, finds that he can no longer lock the door to his cabin. Fearing for his life, he tries to steal a gun from the ship's weapons locker, but is confronted by Captain Stone. Stone dares Merriam to try to get the support of the crew, but Merriam is rebuffed by them. This changes when Radioman Winslow (Edmund Glover) receives a radiogram asking if Merriam is on board, and Captain Stone orders Winslow to lie, replying that Merriam is not. The radioman shows Merriam the captain's reply radiogram and says that he now mistrusts the captain and will send a message to the company expressing his concerns about Stone's mental health. However, as he leaves Merriam's cabin, Winslow encounters the captain. As the two walk side-by-side, Winslow drops the captain's radiogram to the deck, and it is picked up by an illiterate crewman, Finn the Mute (Skelton Knaggs), whose internal monologues serve as a sort of one-man Greek chorus throughout the film.

Captain Stone now orders Merriam to send a radio message to the corporate office advising them that Winslow has been washed overboard. Merriam accuses the captain of murdering Winslow, and the two fight. Crew members intervene, and the captain has the crew tie up Merriam and put him in his bunk. The captain then has First Officer Bowns (Ben Bard) administer a sedative to Merriam. Finn finally delivers the captain's radiogram to Bowns. After reading it, Bowns becomes deeply alarmed. The first officer talks to several other crew members, all of whom now begin questioning the captain's sanity.

Captain Stone overhears Bowns' conversation with the crew, and goes insane. He takes a knife and enters Merriam's cabin to kill the young officer, but Finn arrives to try to stop him. While the crew is up on deck singing, Finn and the captain engage in a desperate struggle in the dark, during which Finn kills the captain. After the captain's death, Merriam is reinstated and the ship returns to its home port of San Pedro.

== Cast ==
- Richard Dix as Captain Will Stone
- Russell Wade as Third Officer Tom Merriam
- Edith Barrett as Ellen Roberts
- Ben Bard as First Officer Bounds
- Skelton Knaggs as Finn, the mute / The Narrator
- Edmund Glover as Jacob "Sparks" Winslow
- Lawrence Tierney as Louie Parker
- Paul Marion as Pete a.k.a. "the Greek"
- Sir Lancelot as Billy Radd (uncredited)

== Production ==
RKO had scored a major financial success with Cat People (1942). The film cost only $141,659, yet brought in almost $4 million in its first two years and saved the studio from financial disaster. RKO wanted to move quickly on a sequel to build on the success of Cat People, but producer Val Lewton wished to make the fantasy-comedy story "The Amorous Ghost" instead. As Lewton and studio wrangled, Lewton commenced production on The Seventh Victim, a horror-murder mystery film, and on May 12, 1943, RKO announced it was delaying production on the sequel The Curse of the Cat People due to the unavailability of key performers. RKO production chief Charles Koerner did not want Lewton to be idle once filming on The Seventh Victim ended nor did he favor the idea of Lewton working on comedy, so Koerner suggested that Lewton direct a horror film set at sea, utilizing the studio's existing ship set, built for Pacific Liner (1939). According to Robert Wise, a longtime collaborator with Lewton, it was this set that gave Lewton the idea for the film. "He would find what we call a 'standing set,' and then tailor his script to the set, whatever it was. That's how he made The Ghost Ship. He walked onto a set and saw a tanker, then cooked up the idea for this ship with a murderous captain." One scholar has suggested that Lewton accepted the assignment in part because, as an amateur sailor himself, the ship captain's behavior mirrored Lewton's own views on how to manage a ship, but also because Lewton saw the plot as a way of criticizing his micro-managing superiors at RKO. The budget, as with all of Lewton's films, was set at $150,000.

At the time screenwriting began, Lewton claimed that the idea for the film was an original one attributable to himself. Leo Mittler did the treatment and Donald Henderson Clarke wrote the script, although Lewton significantly revised the screenplay and wrote many lines of dialogue himself.

Mark Robson was assigned to direct in June 1943. Robson was the RKO director "most in tune with [Lewton's] idea of psychological terror". Robson had just finished editing Orson Welles' Journey Into Fear, and there are distinct stylistic similarities between the two films. Robson and Lewton chose to use single-source lighting throughout the film in order to make the sets and performances more interesting, and sets were designed to utilize this type of lighting. The two men also agreed to continue Lewton's emphasis on unseen and implied terror. Cinematographer Nicholas Musuraca, art directors Albert S. D'Agostino and Walter E. Keller, and composer Roy Webb all regularly worked with Lewton, and did so on The Ghost Ship as well. Richard Dix was cast because he was already on contract with RKO to do several "quickie" pictures at a set fee per film, and doing The Ghost Ship would help fulfill his contract without much effort. Russell Wade had provided a disembodied voice in The Leopard Man, and this was his first starring role in a Lewton production. His performance here led him to be cast in Lewton's later The Body Snatcher (1945). Edith Barrett, Ben Bard, Dewey Robinson, and Charles Lung all had worked with Lewton before. Future film noir star Lawrence Tierney, whom Lewton had seen modeling clothing in a Sears, Roebuck catalog, made his motion picture debut in the movie. Sir Lancelot, a well-known calypso singer, who later influenced the career of Harry Belafonte, had already appeared in singing roles in three prior films (including I Walked with a Zombie). Atmosphere is created in the film by the contrast between murder and the joviality of the calypso songs sung on board.

Production began on 3 August 1943. Many details about the performances, lighting, camera angles, action, and effects were worked out ahead of time in order to not only keep the film under budget but also help achieve suspense on such a low budget. Dr. Jared Criswell, former pastor of the Fifth Avenue Spiritualist Church of New York City, served as a technical consultant on the film regarding psychic phenomena. The picture's final fight scene between the Finn and the mad Captain was shot on a dimly lit set to heighten the suspense and keep the audience from guessing who the victor might be, similar to the way Jacques Tourneur and Lewton had shot a similar scene in Cat People. This technique is repeated in Robson and Lewton's subsequent collaboration The Body Snatcher.

== Release and lawsuit ==
The film was released in theaters on Christmas Eve, 1943. The poster art was most likely painted by William Rose. The film did well at the box office until Lewton was sued for plagiarism in February 1944 by playwrights Samuel R. Golding and Norbert Faulkner, who claimed that the script was based on a play that was submitted to Lewton for a possible film. Because of the suit, The Ghost Ship was withdrawn from theatrical release. Lewton disputed the claim, but the court ruled against him. RKO paid the authors $25,000 in damages and attorney fees of $5,000, and lost all future booking residuals and the right to sell the film for airing on television. Elliot Lavine, a film historian, says that losing the lawsuit deeply disturbed Lewton, leaving him depressed for a significant period of time.

The film did not see release for nearly another 50 years due to the suit. The Ghost Ship did make it into a package of RKO films sold by "C & C Television Films" to local TV stations, but it was quickly withdrawn. It was not until the film's copyright was not renewed and it entered the public domain in the 1990s, that it began to be available again. The film was released as part of the Val Lewton Horror Collection DVD set in 2005. In 2021, it was released on Blu Ray by Warner Archive, sharing a disk with Lewton's film Bedlam.

== Reception ==
At the time of its initial release, the film had a mixed reception, with both positive and negative reviews. Bosley Crowther of The New York Times enjoyed the film, calling it "... a nice little package of morbidity, all wrapped around in gloom." Paul Meehan calls it "a tepid potboiler of malfeasance and murder on the high seas." John Brosnan described The Ghost Ship as "a more conventional mystery-thriller involving a number of deaths on board a ship, but was produced with Lewton's customary attention to atmosphere." The script has come in for significant praise, with Captain Stone being compared to Captain Queeg in The Caine Mutiny, Captain Ahab in Moby-Dick, and Captain Wolf Larsen in The Sea-Wolf. Other critics have pointed out that Stone and Merriam seem to have a father-son relationship, but that the perverseness of the script is that the father-figure becomes so enraged at his "son's" failings that he seeks to murder him.

Modern film critics have also praised the picture's acting, cinematography, and lighting, as well as its ability to scare. Actor Richard Dix is almost uniformly praised for bringing a depth of character, moodiness, and pathos to the role of Captain Stone. The film's direction, cinematography and lighting, too, display a depth of artistry not usually seen in cinema. Cinematographer Nicholas Musuraca won high praise for his chiaroscuro lighting design. Film historian Edmund Bansak has written one scene in particular which is highly effective:

An excellent set-piece early in the film showcases Robson's underrated directorial skill. Robson creates a dynamic sense of menace from a physical object: a massive giant hook hanging from upon an enormous chain, pendulumlike, inches above the deck. ... [The] hook remains unattended and unsecured. ... In a tightly directed, genuinely exciting scene, the monstrous hook sways back and forth in a direct path toward the camera, making one wonder how cinematographer, Nicholas Musuraca, kept his camera (and head) intact during the shooting. ... The lighting is also used to great advantage, the shadows and fog accenting the terror. Half the time the swinging hook is so hidden in the darkness that aside from the creak of its sway, there is no telling which direction it will take.

The set design, too, has been praised for being "suitably claustrophobic." Robson's direction has earned kudos for heightening the suspense by leaving certain actions and motives vague. In the scene in which Seaman Parker (Lawrence Tierney) dies, crushed by the anchor chain, Robson left it unclear whether Captain Stone committed murder by trapping Parker in the anchor chain locker or whether he merely shut the door. The vagueness leaves the audience unsure whether to believe Merriam's accusations against the Captain, and builds an atmosphere of paranoia and doubt which is critical to the picture's success. Contemporary critic Gary Giddins has pointed out that the film incorporates classic Lewton scare tactics but in new ways. "His trademark scare tactic, a high point in practically all of his films, is a long, dark, nightmarish walk, where every sound is magnified and every object threatening. In The Ghost Ship, that "walk" is transferred to the cabin of the victimized third officer ..." Others have pointed out another Lewton device, the gradual stalking of a main character by a murderer, as another deft touch in the film.

Modern critics have also pointed out that the film, unlike so many motion pictures of the 1940s, has an almost exclusively male cast and avoids the trope of a man "redeemed by the love of a good woman." The picture is "entirely concerned with male conflict", one critic noted, and at the end of the film a woman appears only in shadow "as the possibility of salvation" rather than bringing emotional closure. Other film critics have made sustained arguments that the film is a lengthy if coded study of repressed homosexuality, similar to that in Herman Melville's novel, Billy Budd. Indeed, the focus on men and men's problems has led one modern critic to declare the film "one of the most homoerotic films Hollywood ever made."

Contemporary film programmers seem to have a high opinion of the film as well. A 1993 Film Forum series, "Val Lewton: Horror Most Noir", screened The Ghost Ship 42 times, while I Walked With A Zombie screened only 10 times and Cat People a mere eight. Film director Alison Maclean chose The Ghost Ship for a retrospective of classic RKO films, arguing that the film was "genuinely eccentric" and a cinematic revelation. When The Ghost Ship was shown on French cable television in the late 1990s, it was introduced as a prime example of Val Lewton's genius at presenting "unseen horror."
