= Moonfleet Manor Hotel =

Hotel and manor house in Dorset, England

Moonfleet Manor
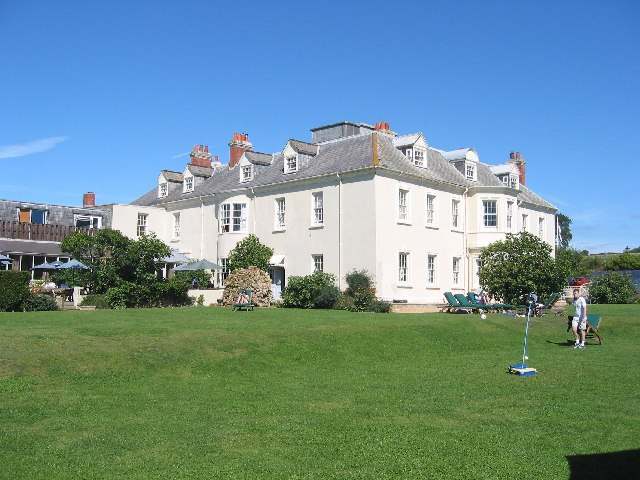

- Location within Dorset Location within the United Kingdom
- 50.6238°N 2.5422°W
- Location: Fleet, Dorset, England

Listed Building – Grade II
- Official name: Moonfleet Manor Hotel, Fleet
- Designated: 26 January 1956
- Reference no.: 1152114

Moonfleet Manor Hotel is a hotel and former manor house in Fleet, Dorset, England. With 17th century origins, much of the house dates to the 18th and 19th centuries. It is a Grade II listed building, as is its former stable block and coach house.

The manor was featured in the 1898 novel Moonfleet by J. Meade Falkner.

== History ==
Moonfleet Manor Hotel was originally known as Fleet House. The oldest parts of the house to survive, believed to be the south wing and parts of the east and west wings, have been dated to the early 17th century. The house was mentioned in Coker's Survey of Dorsetshire, written by Thomas Gerard in the 1620s, as the seat of Maximilian Mohun. It is believed that Mohun had the house built.

The house was remodelled during the 18th century and again in 1880 before undergoing a restoration in 1896. At the time, the manor had grounds of approximately 136 acres. The house became occupied by the Gould family during the 18th century. It remained under their ownership until it was sold to the George family in 1896.

After the war, the manor became the Moonfleet Hotel, which opened in August 1946. The four-star hotel underwent a £1 million refurbishment after it was purchased by the current owners, Nigel Chapman and Nicholas Dickinson, in 1997.
