= David Daker =

English actor (1935–2026)

- Daker in the ITV Playhouse episode "Dogfood Dan and the Carmarthen Cowboy" (1982)
- Born: Colin David Daker; 29 September 1935; Bilston, Staffordshire, England
- Died: 30 April 2026 (aged 90)
- Occupation: Actor
- Years active: 1963–2009
- Spouse(s): Stella Newton (m. 1957) Hilary Voisey (m. 1998)
- Children: 3

Colin David Daker (29 September 1935 – 30 April 2026) was an English actor. He had a regular role as Harry Crawford in 93 episodes of the series Boon from 1986 to 1995.

Other credits include Coronation Street (1968–1985), Z Cars (1967–1977), Dixon of Dock Green (1969–1972), Villains (1972), Doctor Who (1973, 1979), Stardust (1974), Play for Today (1975–1984), Time Bandits (1981), Dick Turpin (1979–1982), Minder (1980–1985), Moonfleet (1984), Hallelujah! (1984), I Bought a Vampire Motorcycle (1990), The Woman in Black (1989), and Crown Prosecutor (1995).

== Early life and education ==
Colin David Daker, the youngest of five children, was born in Bilston, then in Staffordshire, on 29 September 1935 to Elijah Daker, a shoe factory worker and his wife Olive (née Cutler). He attended the local Etheridge Secondary Modern School (now called Moseley Park School).

== Career ==
On leaving school, Daker initially trained as a draughtsman, but left after two years. Shortly afterwards, he joined the Oxford Playhouse Theatre School, before undertaking national service in the RAF. In 1957, he joined Oldham Rep as a stage manager, actor and director.

Between 1986 and 1995 Daker appeared in Boon as Harry Crawford, the entrepreneurial friend of the show's titular protagonist and fellow former firefighter Ken Boon (Michael Elphick); alongside his co-star, he appeared in all 93 episodes of the series.

Daker appeared in a number of television series, including All Creatures Great and Small, Minder, Heartbeat, When the Boat Comes In, Thriller, Juliet Bravo, Hazell, The Main Chance, Dangerfield, The Gentle Touch, Midsomer Murders, Sorry!, The Bill and Rising Damp. Daker made notable appearances as Tommy Mackay in Only Fools and Horses and Jarvis in Porridge. He appeared twice in Doctor Who, playing Irongron in The Time Warrior (1973–74) and Captain Rigg in Nightmare of Eden (1979).

In 2003, Daker returned to Doctor Who playing the part of Gilbrook in the Big Finish audio story Creatures of Beauty, replacing Clive Swift in the role after Swift pulled out due to an illness in his family. He played the recurring role of Captain Nathan Spiker in Dick Turpin, and appeared in the second series of Hallelujah! as Brother Benjamin. Daker appeared in two roles in Coronation Street: as Basil Griffin between 1968 and 1969, and Gordon Lewis, the unpopular relief manager of the Rovers Return on three stints between 1981 and 1985.

In film, Daker played young Kevin's father in Time Bandits (1981) and the desk sergeant in I Bought a Vampire Motorcycle (1990).

== Personal life and death ==
Daker married Stella Newton in 1957. They had one son and one daughter. Daker and Newton later divorced and he married Hilary Voisey in 1998; they had a daughter. He died on 30 April 2026, aged 90.

== Filmography ==
=== Film ===
| Year | Title | Role | Notes |
|---|---|---|---|
| 1973 | O Lucky Man! | Various | |
| 1973 | The Optimists of Nine Elms | Bob Ellis | |
| 1974 | The Black Windmill | MI5 Man | |
| 1974 | Stardust | Ralph Woods | |
| 1976 | Aces High | Bennett | |
| 1976 | Voyage of the Dammed | First Officer | |
| 1979 | That Summer! | Pub Landlord | |
| 1981 | Time Bandits | Kevin's Father | |
| 1982 | Britannia Hospital | Guest Workman | |
| 1990 | I Bought a Vampire Motorcycle | Desk Sergeant | |

=== Television ===
| Year | Title | Role | Notes |
|---|---|---|---|
| 1964 | Detective | Thomas Yaxley | Episode: "The Loring Mystery" |
| 1966 | King of the River | Jack Flynn | Episode: "Keeping the Old Spirit Alive" |
| 1967–1977 | Z Cars | PC Culshaw; Reg; Sgt. Milne | 84 episodes |
| 1968–1985 | Coronation Street | Basil Griffin; Gordon Lewis | 31 episodes |
| 1969 | ITV Sunday Night Theatre | Ken | Episode: "Travelling Where?" |
| 1969–1972 | Dixon of Dock Green | Headmaster; Jock | 2 episodes |
| 1970 | Parkin's Patch | Det. Sgt. Milburn | Episode: "The Spider's Web" |
| 1971 | UFO | SHADO Guard (uncredited) | Episode: "Flight Path" |
| 1971 | Trial | Prior | Episode: "On the Evidence You Will Hear" |
| 1972 | Villains | George | 6 episodes |
| 1973 | Full House | Fedya in On the High Road | Episode: #1.22 |
| 1973 | General Hospital | Unknown | Episode: #1.63 |
| 1973 | Hadleigh | Ted Prior | Episode: "Gentleman and Players" |
| 1973 | Second City Firsts | Peter | Episode: "If a Man Answers" |
| 1973–1974, 1979 | Doctor Who | Irongron; Rigg | Serials: "The Time Warrior" and "Nightmare of Eden" |
| 1974 | The Carnforth Practice | Tanker Driver | Episode: "The Aristocrat" |
| 1974 | Hunter's Walk | Barry Dawes | Episode: "Villain" |
| 1974 | Armchair Cinema | Tusser | Episode: "Regan" |
| 1974 | Marked Personal | Jack Williams | 2 episodes |
| 1974 | Dial M for Murder | Tony | Episode: "Recording Angel" |
| 1974 | ITV Sunday Night Drama | Sussex | Episode: "The Ceremony of Innocence" |
| 1974–1976 | Centre Play | Jacky Maddison; Max | 2 episodes |
| 1975 | Churchill's People | John Bradwater | Episode: "Shouts and Murmurs" |
| 1975 | The Hanged Man | Piet Hollander | Episode: "The Bridge Maker" |
| 1975 | The Main Chance | Jacobson | Episode: "Survival" |
| 1975 | The Rough with the Smooth | Rudolph Culpepper | Episode: "The Broom Cupboard" |
| 1975 | Daft As a Brush | Jack Baker | Television film |
| 1975 | BBC Play of the Month | Cpl. Hill | Episode: "Chips with Everything" |
| 1975 | Thriller | Charlie Draper | Episode: "Kill Two Birds" |
| 1975 | Softly Softly: Task Force | Walters | Episode: "Dorothy's Birthday" |
| 1975–1984 | Play for Today | Various | 8 episodes |
| 1976 | Widowing of Mrs. Holroyd | Mr. Holroyd | Television film |
| 1976 | Three Days in Szczecin | Workers' spokesman | Television film |
| 1976–1981 | When the Boat Comes In | Chater Sid Meek | 2 episodes |
| 1977 | Eleanor Marx | Will Thorne | 2 episodes |
| 1977 | Warship | PO Asdale | Episode: "Counter Charge" |
| 1977 | Porridge | Jarvis | Episode: "Final Stretch" |
| 1977 | Rising Damp | Mr. Brent | Episode: "That's My Boy" |
| 1977 | The Dick Emery Show | Unknown | Episode: #16.2 |
| 1977 | Target | Mike Ansell | Episode: "Vandraggers" |
| 1977 | BBC2 Play of the Week | Max | Episode: "The Kitchen" |
| 1978 | Hazell | Dave Ryman | Episode: "Hazell and the Rubber-Heel Brigade" |
| 1978 | Holocaust | Rudolf Hoess | Episode: "Part 4: 1944–1945" |
| 1978 | Strangers | Roy Stephens | Episode: "Right and Wrong" |
| 1979 | All Creatures Great and Small | Mr. Barratt | Episode: "Puppy Love" |
| 1979 | Charlie Muffin | Bolton | Television film |
| 1979 | Two People | Len Fletcher | 5 episodes |
| 1979 | Saint Joan | Poulengey | Television film |
| 1979–1982 | Dick Turpin | Captain Nathan Spiker | 13 episodes |
| 1980 | The Enigma Files | Major Mike Clark | Episode: "The Full Flying Carpet Treatment" |
| 1980–1985 | Minder | Alex Brompton; Sir Ronald Bates | 2 episodes |
| 1981 | The Gentle Touch | Sam Taylor | Episode: "Doubt" |
| 1981 | BBC2 Playhouse | Alf | Episode: "The Grudge Fight" |
| 1981–1985 | Juliet Bravo | Charlie Pendle; Chris Oldham; Colin Bright | 3 episodes |
| 1982 | Legacy of Murder | Mechanic | Episode: "Who Do You Voodoo?" |
| 1982 | ITV Playhouse | 'Dogfood' Dan Milton | Episode: "Dogfood Dan and the Camarthen Cowboy" |
| 1982 | Only Fools and Horses | Tommy Mackay | Episode: "No Greater Love" |
| 1983 | BBC Television Shakespeare | Various | Episodes: Henry VI and Richard III |
| 1983 | To the Lighthouse | Mr. Trevorrow | Television film |
| 1983 | Give us a Break | Ron Palmer | 7 episodes |
| 1984 | Crown Court | Harry Barber | Serial: "There Was an Old Woman" |
| 1984 | Moonfleet | Elzevir Block | 6 episodes |
| 1984 | Hallelujah! | Brother Benjamin Bob Scratchitt | 8 episodes |
| 1985 | Summer Season | Leo Lyon | Episode: "Urban Jungle" |
| 1986 | Sorry! | Byron Hadlee | Episode: "The Primal Scene, So to Speak" |
| 1986 | Love and Marriage | Maurice Bannister | Episode: "A Walk Under Ladders" |
| 1986–1995 | Boon | Harry Crawford | 93 episodes |
| 1987 | Up Line | Leon Targett | 4 episodes |
| 1987 | Screen Two | Mr. Plant | Episode: "The Children of Dynmouth" |
| 1988 | Blind Justice | Det. Insp. Gee | Episode: "A Death in the Family" |
| 1989 | The Woman in Black | Josiah Freston | Television film |
| 1995 | Crown Prosecutor | Ben Campbell | 10 episodes |
| 1995 | Resort to Murder | Sam Penny | 4 episodes |
| 1995 | Pigeon Summer | Uncle Charley | TV mini-series |
| 1995–2000 | The Bill | Laurie Coleman; Mick Davies | 2 episodes |
| 1996 | The Vet | Gerry Leadbetter | Episode: "Out of the Past" |
| 1996 | Paul Merton in Galton and Simpson's... | Farmer | Episode: "Twelve Angry Men" |
| 1996 | Casualty | Jim Porteous | Episode: "Waterwings" |
| 1997 | Dangerfield | Ken Markham | Episode: "Perfect Witness" |
| 1998 | Midsomer Murders | Harry Vellacott | Episode: "Faithful unto Death" |
| 1999 | The Ruth Rendell Mysteries | Stanley Clayton | Episode: "The Fallen Curtain" |
| 2000 | Dalziel and Pascoe | Jack Turton | Episode: "A Sweeter Lazarus" |
| 2000 | Heartbeat | Matty Lovell | Episode: "War Stories" |
| 2001 | Where the Heart Is | Peter Lampard | Episode: "Pound of Flesh" |
| 2001 | Hearts and Bones | Mr. Rose | 2 episodes |
| 2001 | Big Bad World | Ernest | 3 episodes |
| 2002–2007 | Doctors | Eric Barbar; Jim Young | 2 episodes |
| 2004 | The Last Detective | Jervis Beauchamp | Episode: "Benefit to Mankind" |
| 2004 | Powers | Mike Knowles | Episode: "The Future Is Yours" |
| 2004–2009 | Holby City | Bill Gibbs; Mr Frisby | 2 episodes |
