= The Lost Stradivarius =

Short English ghost novel, 1895

- Cover of the first edition
- Author: J. Meade Falkner
- Language: English
- Genre: Horror novel
- Publisher: William Blackwood
- Publication date: 1895
- Publication place: United Kingdom
- Media type: Print (Hardback)
- Pages: 296 pp

The Lost Stradivarius (1895), by J. Meade Falkner, is a short horror novel about ghosts and the evil that can be invested in an object, in this case an extremely fine Stradivarius violin. It has been described as "one of Falkner's three celebrated novels" and as a "psychic romance".

== Plot ==
After finding the violin of the title in a hidden compartment in his college rooms, the protagonist, a wealthy young heir, becomes increasingly secretive as well as obsessed by a particular piece of music, which seems to have the power to call up the ghost of the violin's previous owner. Roaming from England to Italy, the story involves family love, lordly depravity, and the tragedy of obsession, all conveyed in a "high" serious tone not uncommon in late Victorian literature. Preceding M. R. James's ghost stories by several years, it has been called the novel James might have written, had he written novels.

== Broadcast ==
This story was adapted as the first episode of the ATV-produced ITV horror anthology series Mystery and Imagination, broadcast on 29 January 1966. All known copies of the episode were wiped or destroyed, and only a complete low-quality audio recording is known to exist.

BBC Radio 4 broadcast an audio adaptation in October 1996, dramatised by Jeremy Front with music by Ilona Sekacz and starring Paul Rhys. It was rebroadcast on BBC Radio4 Extra in 2025.

In August 2008, a Joanna David reading of the novel was broadcast on BBC Radio 7.
