= J. Meade Falkner =

English novelist and poet

John Meade Falkner
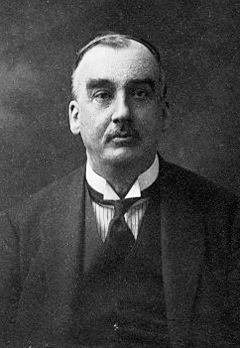
- Born: 8 May 1858; Manningford Bruce, Wiltshire, England
- Died: 22 July 1932 (aged 74); Durham, England
- Occupation: Novelist
- Writing career
- Pen name: J. Meade Falkner
- Period: 1895-1903

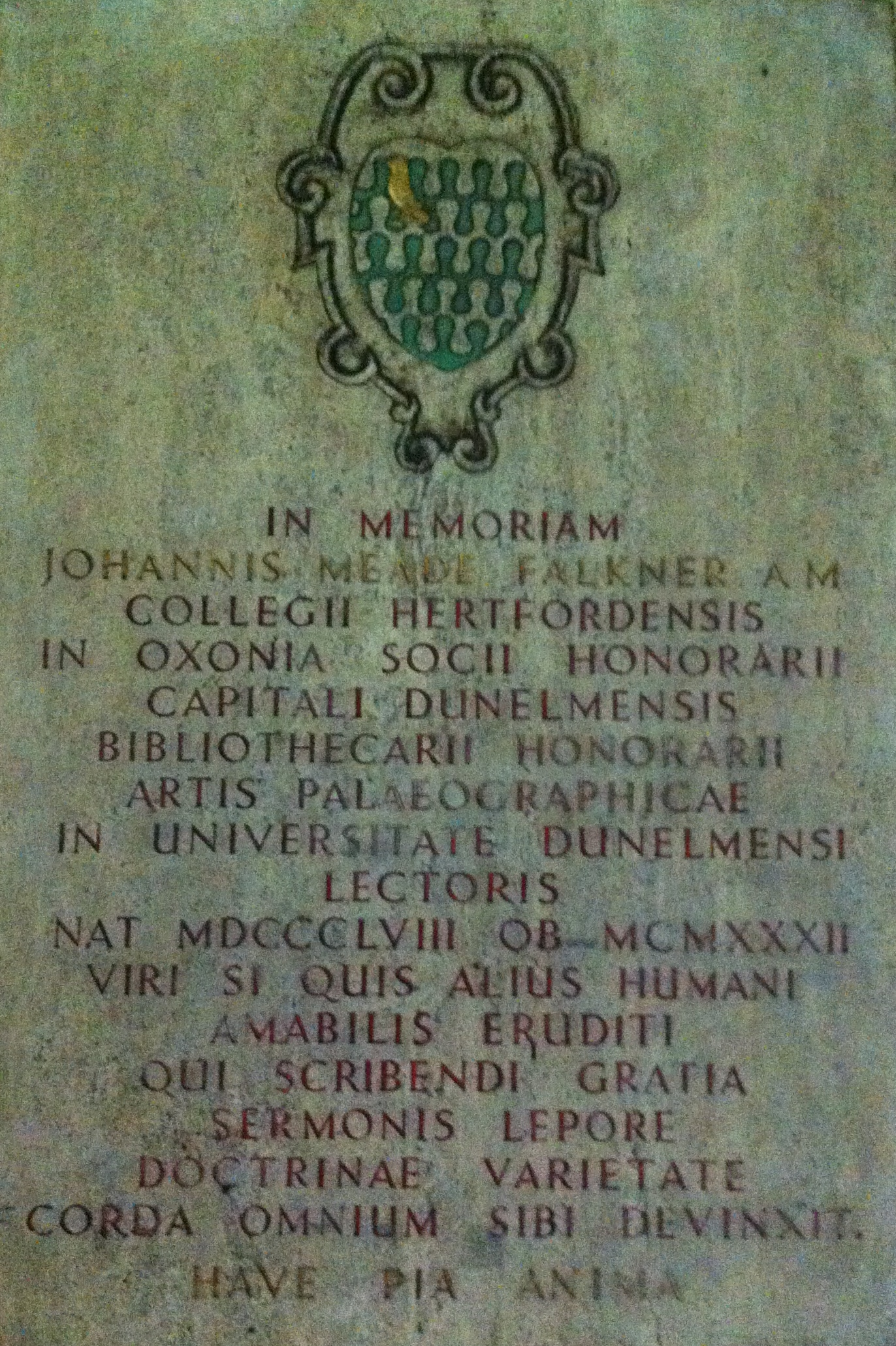
Memorial to John Meade Falkner at Durham Cathedral. The coat of arms takes the form of that described in his book The Nebuly Coat.

John Meade Falkner (8 May 1858 – 22 July 1932) was an English novelist and poet, best known for his 1898 novel Moonfleet. An extremely successful businessman, he became chairman of the arms manufacturer Armstrong Whitworth during World War I.

== Life and works ==
Falkner was born in Manningford Bruce, Wiltshire, and spent much of his childhood in Dorchester and Weymouth. He was educated at Marlborough College and Hertford College, Oxford, graduating with a third-class degree in history in 1882. After Oxford, he was a master at Derby School, then went to Newcastle as tutor to the family of Sir Andrew Noble, who ran Armstrong Whitworth Co., one of the largest arms manufacturers in the world. Falkner eventually followed him as chairman in 1915. In his business travels round the world, Falkner brought back antiquarian treasures of all kinds.

After his retirement as chairman in 1921 he became Honorary Reader in paleography at the University of Durham, as well as Honorary Librarian to the Dean and Chapter Library of Durham Cathedral. Falkner fell in love with Durham and, although he spent his later years travelling frequently, he called Durham his home, living in the Divinity House (now the University Music School) on Palace Green in front of the cathedral from 1902 until his death. There is a commemorative plaque there, while his monument is in the south cloister of the cathedral. He is buried at St John the Baptist Church in Burford, Oxfordshire.

In addition to his three novels and his poetry, he also wrote three topographical guides (Oxfordshire, Bath and Berkshire) and a History of Oxfordshire.

== Bibliography ==
=== Fiction ===
- The Lost Stradivarius (1895)
- Moonfleet (1898)
- The Nebuly Coat (1903)

=== Non-fiction ===
- Handbook for Travellers in Oxfordshire (1894)
- A History of Oxfordshire (1899)
- Handbook for Berkshire (1902)
- Bath in History and Social Tradition (1918) ['by an appreciative visitor']
- A History of Durham Cathedral Library, with an Additional Chapter on some Late Durham Bibliophiles (1925) [authored with H.D. Hughes]
