= Udny Mort House =

Morthouse in Aberdeenshire, Scotland

Coordinates: 57.327076°N 2.200658°W

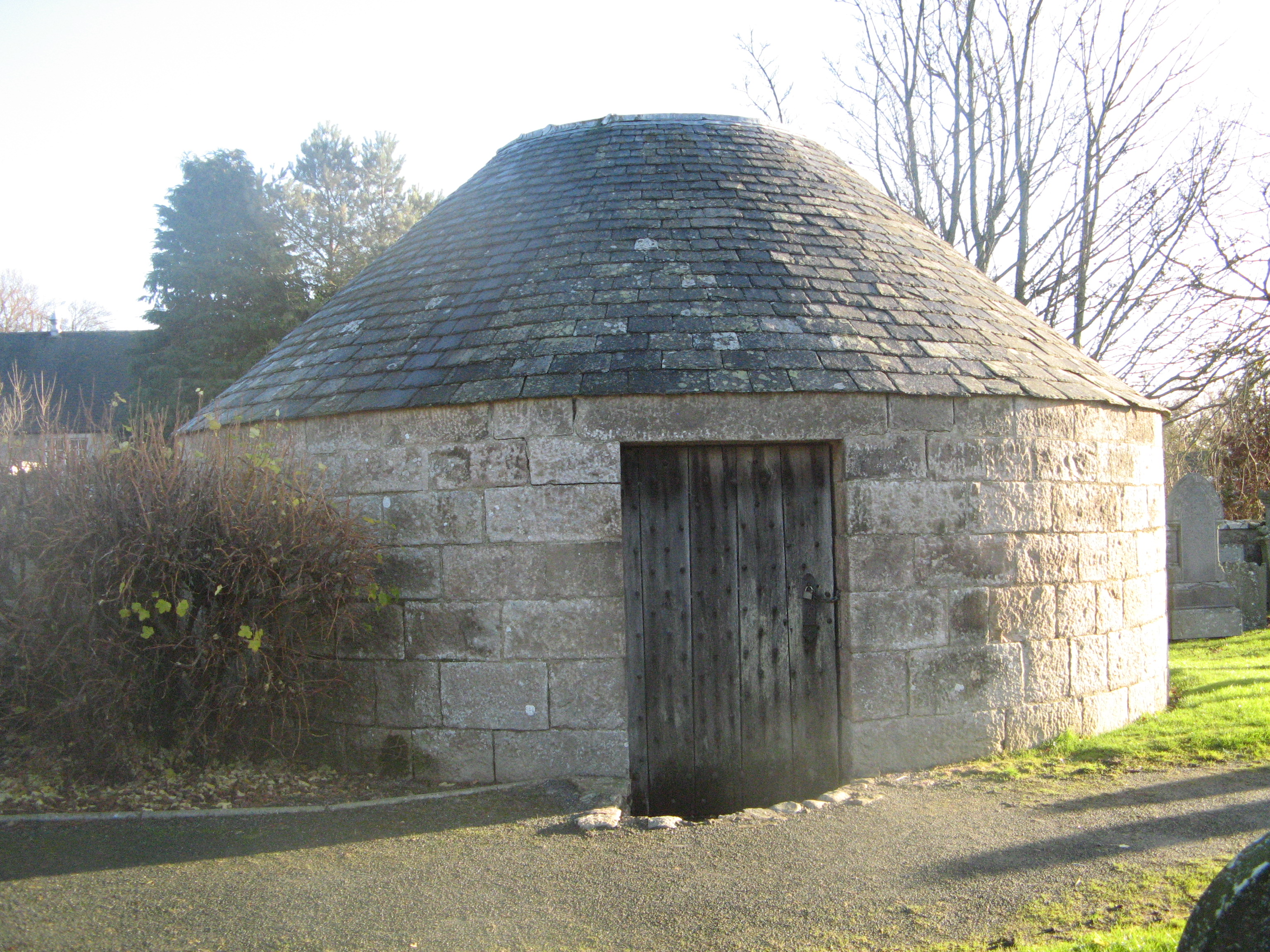
Udny Mort House

Udny Mort House is a morthouse in the old kirkyard at Udny Green, Aberdeenshire, in the north-east of Scotland. Built in 1832, it is today a Category B listed building. It housed corpses until decomposition had progressed sufficiently that their graves would not be desecrated by resurrectionists and body-snatchers seeking to sell cadavers to medical colleges for dissection. Bodies were permitted to be stored for up to three months before burial. The circular morthouse was designed with a revolving platform and double doors. After the passage of the Anatomy Act 1832 Udny Mort House gradually fell into disuse; minutes of the committee responsible for its operation cease in about July 1836.

== Background ==
In the 18th and 19th centuries body-snatchers, also known as resurrectionists, shush-lifters or noddies, excavated graves to meet the increasing demand from medical colleges for bodies to dissect, as executions no longer supplied sufficient numbers. Precautions were taken to protect the bodies and various methods were used to prevent access to graves. In Scotland, vaults, watch houses, mort houses and mortsafes were used. Grave-robbing was a widespread problem and, in 1821, the minister for West Calder, Reverend W. Fleming wrote:

Few burial grounds in Scotland, it is believed, have escaped the ravaging hands of resurrection men; and it is reported that with respect to a church-yard not far from Edinburgh, that, till within three years ago, when the inhabitants began to watch the graves, the persons interred did not remain in their graves above a night, and that these depredations were successfully carried on for nine successive winters.

Bodies were securely kept in locked buildings until the process of natural decomposition rendered the cadavers useless for dissection.

== History ==
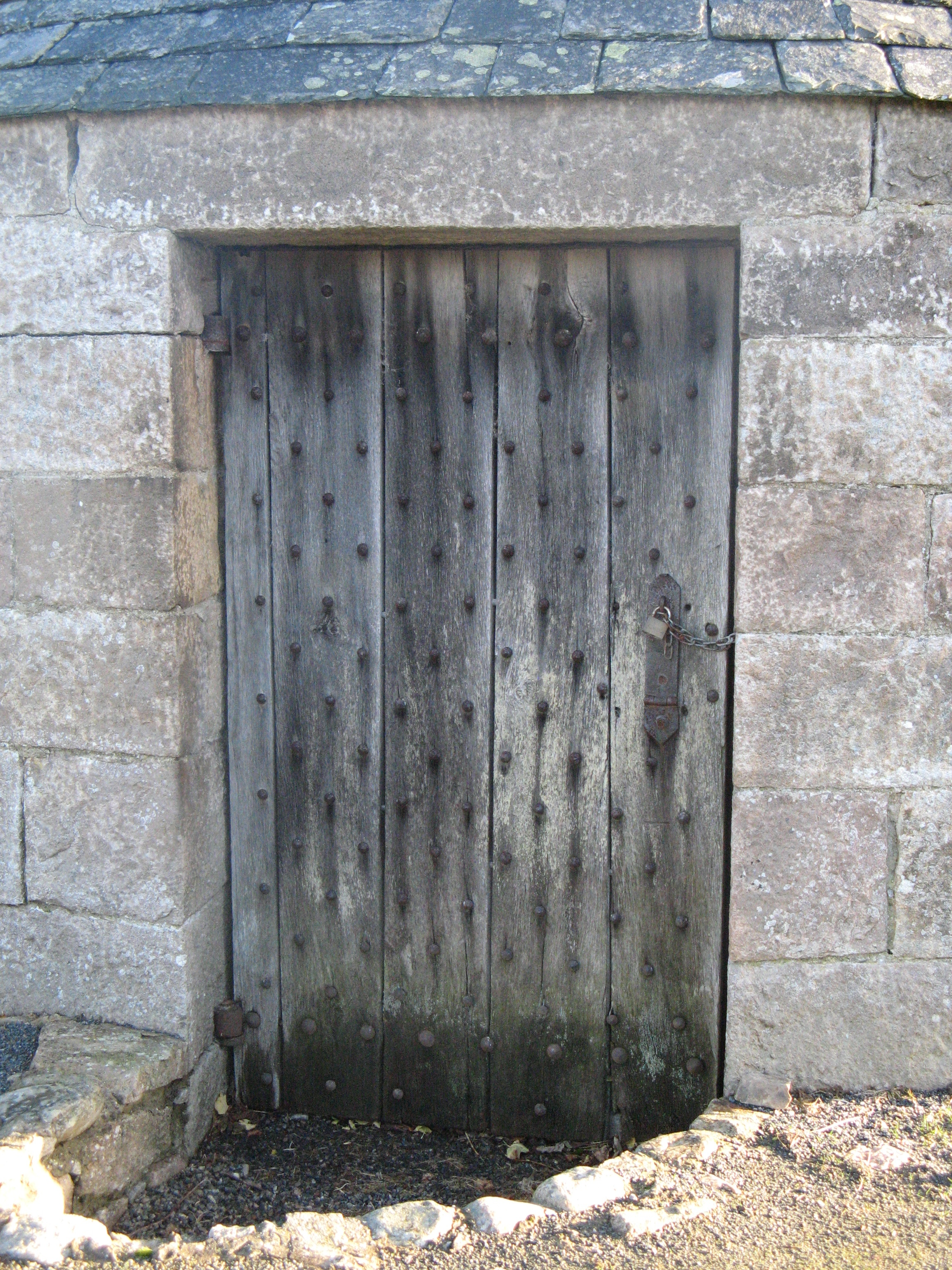
The outer door

A group of 15 local gentlemen held a meeting in Udny Green on 21 January 1832 to discuss constructing a vault within the churchyard to hold dead bodies until they could be buried. Agreement was reached and a decision was made to use a plan that had been submitted by John Marr of Cairnbrogie. Formally adopted the following week, an advertisement was placed in the Aberdeen Journal on 15 February 1832, inviting tenders for the construction of the morthouse. Applications were also invited from potential subscribers to use the facility. The contracts to undertake the building work were awarded on 17 March 1832; however, difficulties were encountered collecting the subscriptions (which were to be used to cover the building costs), so the plans were altered to reduce costs. Construction was to be completed by 1 September 1832 but was delayed after arguments took place with the mason. The contractors received final payments on 26 January 1833 and the formal "Regulations for the management of the vault at Udny" were agreed on 23 February.

The regulations are likely to be similar to those applied to other mort houses, although records of other structures are not generally available. Rules included stipulations as to the construction of coffins, which had to be made from well-seasoned fir 7/8 inches thick and completely air-tight. Additionally, any bodies considered to be "infectious or otherwise dangerous" had to be wrapped in tin plate or lead. A penalty of two pounds was levied on the maker of a coffin that did not conform to the requirements.

Bodies were permitted to remain in the morthouse for up to three months. Non-subscribers were allowed use of the vault by paying between five and twenty shillings, at the committee's discretion. Four members of the committee were key bearers, and it was compulsory for them to be present to open and close the vault whenever necessary, although they were to be given twenty-four hours notice that they were required.

After the passing of the Anatomy Act 1832, the morthouse gradually fell into disuse. The minutes of the committee meeting held on 4 July 1836 record that the key-bearers were warned they must be present when the doors were being opened, or they could be fined.

== Architecture ==
The building was constructed from ashlar granite in 1832 to the design of John Marr of Cairnbrogie; the masonry work was undertaken by Alexander Wallace of Smiddyhill. Thomas Smith of Oldmeldrum completed the carpentry work. The roof is slated rather than the more common covering of turf. There is a thick oak outer door accompanied by an iron inner door.

The structure has no windows. Three feet above the floor inside was a revolving circular oak platform, on which the coffins were placed. The interior has a domed stone roof and lath and plaster walls.

Udny Mort House is described as a "rare and important structure" by Scottish Church Heritage Research. Historic Scotland allocated it a Category B listing in April 1971. Some restoration work was undertaken in 1976–77. A further inspection by Aberdeenshire Council officials in July 1998 suggested it required further work, particularly highlighting the need for repointing and some roof slate replacement.

The dead house in Ontario, Canada, built in about 1868, is a very similar structure to Udny Mort House. It seems to have been used during bad weather to store bodies until burial was possible.
