= Resurrectionists in the United Kingdom =

People employed to exhume bodies during the 18th and 19th centuries

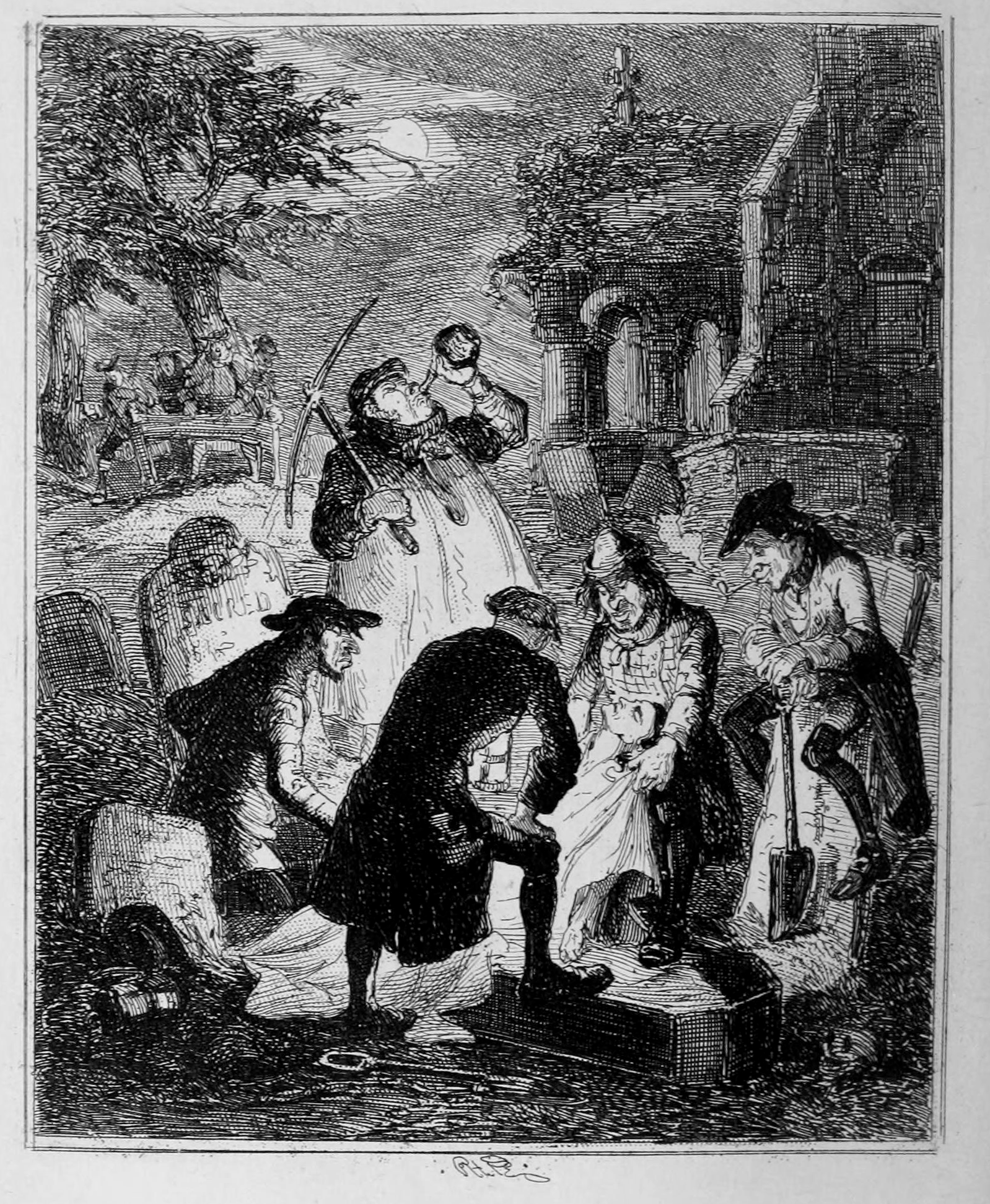
Resurrectionists (1847), by Hablot Knight Browne. This illustration accompanies an account of John Holmes and Peter Williams who, for unearthing cadavers in 1777, were publicly whipped from Holborn to St Giles, London.

Resurrectionists were body snatchers who were commonly employed by anatomists in the United Kingdom during the 18th and 19th centuries to exhume the bodies of the recently dead. Between 1506 and 1752 very few cadavers were legally available each year for anatomical research. The supply was increased when, in an attempt to intensify the deterrent effect of the death penalty, Parliament passed the Murder Act 1752. By allowing judges to substitute the public display of executed criminals with dissection (a fate generally viewed with horror), the new law significantly increased the number of bodies anatomists could legally access. This proved insufficient to meet the needs of the hospitals and teaching centres that opened during the 18th century. Corpses and their component parts became a commodity, but although the practice of disinterment was hated by the general public, bodies were not legally anyone's property. The resurrectionists therefore operated in a legal grey area.

Nevertheless, resurrectionists caught plying their trade ran the risk of physical attack. Measures taken to stop them included increased security at graveyards. Night watches patrolled grave sites, the rich placed their dead in secure coffins, and physical barriers such as mortsafes and heavy stone slabs made extraction of corpses more difficult. Body snatchers were not the only people to come under attack; in the public's view, the 1752 Act made anatomists agents of the law, enforcers of the death penalty. Riots at execution sites, from where anatomists collected legal corpses, were commonplace.

Matters came to a head following the Burke and Hare murders of 1828. Parliament responded by setting up the 1828 Select Committee on anatomy, whose report emphasised the importance of anatomical science and recommended that the bodies of paupers be given over for dissection. In response to the discovery in 1831 of a gang known as the London Burkers, who apparently modelled their activities on those of Burke and Hare, Parliament debated a bill submitted by Henry Warburton, author of the Select Committee's report. Although it did not make body snatching illegal, the resulting Act of Parliament effectively put an end to the work of the resurrectionists by allowing anatomists access to the workhouse dead.

== Legal background ==
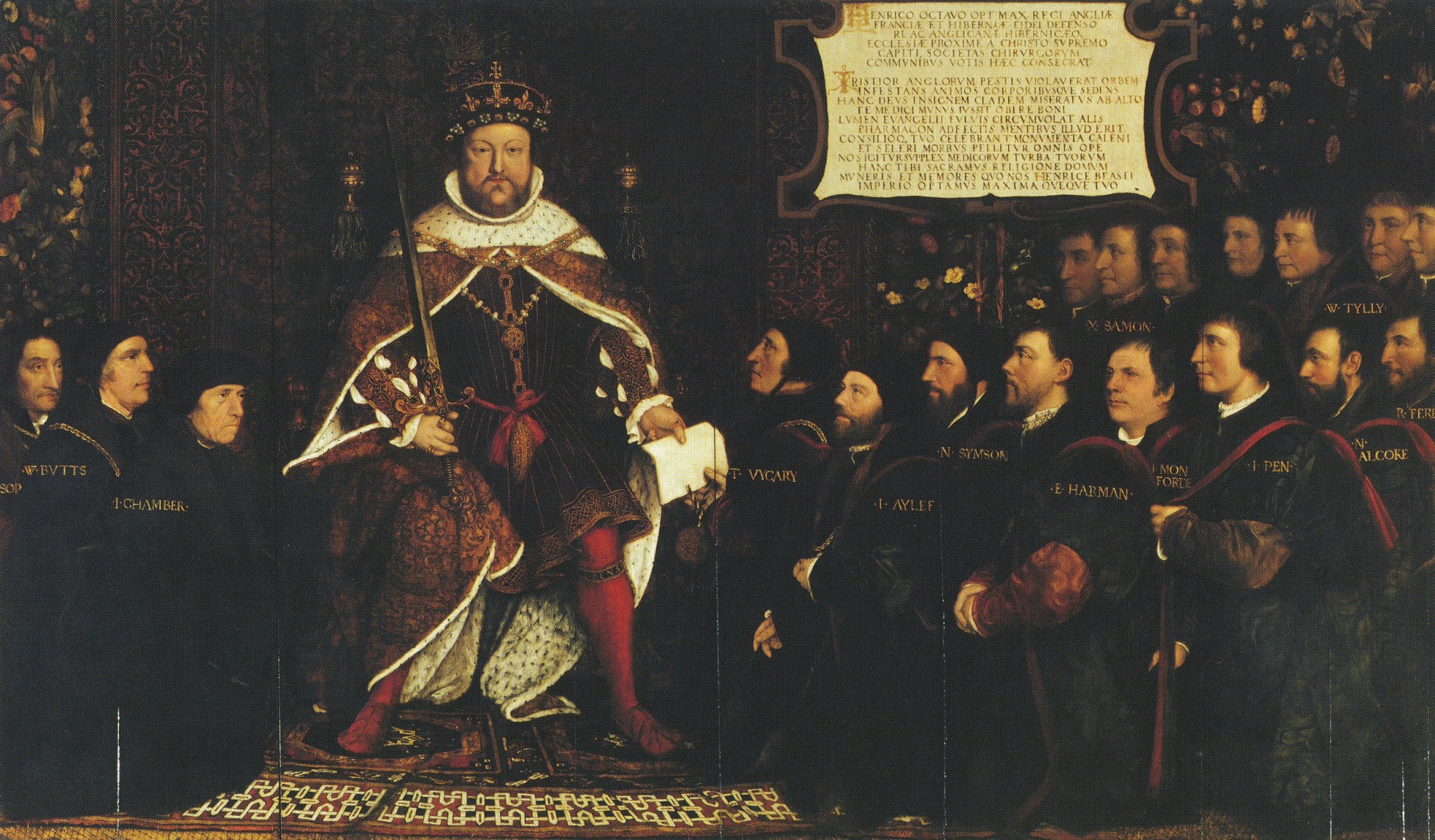
Henry VIII and the Barber Surgeons (1543), by Hans Holbein the Younger. Anatomical research on human cadavers was legalised in England in 1540.

Human cadavers have been dissected by physicians since at least the 3rd century BC, but throughout history, prevailing religious views on the desecration of corpses often meant that such work was performed in secrecy. The Christian church forbade human dissection until the 14th century, when the first recorded anatomisation of a cadaver took place in Bologna. Until then, anatomical research was limited to the dissection of animals. In Britain, human dissection was proscribed by law until 1506, when King James IV of Scotland gave royal patronage to the Barber-Surgeons of Edinburgh, allowing them to dissect the "bodies of certain executed criminals". England followed in 1540, when Henry VIII gave patronage to the Company of Barber-Surgeons, allowing them access to four executed felons each year (Charles II later increased this to six felons each year). Elizabeth I granted the College of Physicians the right to anatomise four felons annually in 1564.

Several major hospitals and teaching centres were established in Britain during the 18th century, but with only a very few corpses legally available for dissection, these institutions suffered from severe shortages. Some local authorities had already attempted to alleviate the problem, with limited success; in 1694, Edinburgh allowed anatomists to dissect corpses "found dead in the streets, and the bodies of such as die violent deaths ... who shall have nobody to own them". Suicide victims were given over, as were infants who had died while being born and also the unclaimed bodies of abandoned children. But even though they were supported by the common law, anatomists occasionally found it difficult to collect what was granted to them. Fuelled by resentment of how readily the death penalty was used, and imbued with superstitious beliefs, crowds sometimes sought to keep the bodies of executed felons away from the authorities. Riots at execution sites were commonplace; worried about possible disorder, in 1749 the Sheriff of London ignored the surgeons and gave the dead to their relatives.

These problems, together with a desire to enhance the deterrent effect of the death penalty, resulted in the passage of the Murder Act 1752. It required that "every murderer shall, after execution, either be dissected or hung in chains". Dissection was generally viewed as "a fate worse than death"; giving judges the ability to substitute gibbeting with dissection was an attempt to invoke that horror. While the Act gave anatomists statutory access to many more cadavers than were previously available, it proved insufficient. Attempting to bolster the supply, some surgeons offered money to pay the prison expenses and funeral clothing costs of condemned prisoners, while bribes were paid to officials present at the gallows, sometimes leading to an unfortunate situation in which corpses not legally given over for dissection were taken anyway.

== Commodification ==
Documented cases of grave robbery for medical purposes can be found as far back as 1319. The 15th-century polymath Leonardo da Vinci may have secretly dissected around 30 corpses, although their provenance remains unknown. (Note: During the 16th and 17th centuries Italy became a European leader in the study of anatomy, with English anatomists travelling there to study. For instance, William Harvey, the first physician to demonstrate the human body's circulatory system, studied at the University of Padua.) In Britain, the practice appears to have been common early in the 17th century. For example, William Shakespeare's epitaph on his gravestone in the chancel of Holy Trinity Church in Stratford-upon-Avon reads "Good friend, for Jesus' sake forbear, To dig the dust enclosed here. Blessed be the man that spares these stones, And cursed be he that moves my bones" (Note: Good frend for Iesvs sake forbeare, To digg the dvst encloased heare. Bleste be ye man yt spares thes stones, And cvrst be he yt moves my bones") and in 1678, anatomists were suspected of being involved in the disappearance of an executed gypsy's body. Contracts issued in 1721 by the Edinburgh College of Surgeons include a clause directing students not to become involved in exhumation, suggesting, according to historian Ruth Richardson, that students had already done the exact opposite. Pupils accompanied professional body snatchers as observers, and were reported to have obtained and paid for their studies with human corpses, perhaps indicating that their tutors were complicit.

It has long been thought that the unauthorised removal of bodies from London graveyards became commonplace by the 1720s and that fresh corpses had likely undergone commodification, probably as a direct result of the lack of legally available bodies for anatomical research. Recent research has discovered and examined a spate of early cases of churchyard body snatching. These cases suggest the practice emerged in London during the 1710s, that the earliest known prosecutions for body snatching probably set judicial precedent in London, and that the thefts were usually well-organised and by proxy. Most (if not all) of these incidents were perpetrated by surgeons educated at St Thomas' Hospital, who bribed corrupt sextons and grave diggers to steal on their behalf, and then dissected the stolen corpses during private anatomy lecture courses.

"The Corporation of Corpse-stealers, I am told, support themselves and Families very comfortably; and that no one should be surpriz'd at the Name of such a Society, the late Resurrections in St. Saviour's, St. Giles's, and St. Pancras's Churchyards, are memorable Instances of this laudable Profession."

— A View of London and Westminster: or, The Town Spy, &c.

Corpses and parts thereof were traded like any other merchandise: packed into suitable containers, salted and preserved, stored in cellars and quays and transported in carts, waggons and boats. Encouraged by fierce competition, anatomy schools usually paid more promptly than their peers, who included individual surgeons, artists and others with an interest in human anatomy. As one body snatcher testified, "a man may make a good living at it, if he is a sober man, and acts with judgement, and supplies the schools".

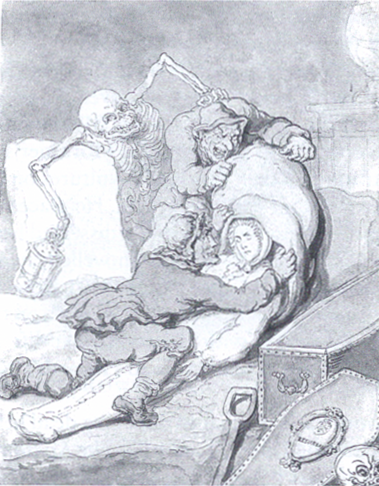
Resurrection Men, by Thomas Rowlandson. Watched by a skeleton, two body snatchers place an exhumed corpse into a sack.

In London, by the late 18th century, anatomists may have delegated their grave-robbing almost entirely to body snatchers, or, as they were commonly known, resurrectionists. A fifteen-strong gang of such men, exposed in Lambeth in 1795, supplied "eight surgeons of public repute, and a man who calls himself an Articulator". (Note: "To restore order, and discover the offenders if possible, a large reward was offered, and the committee aforesaid appointed; by whose enquiries, it was found that the Grave Digger, and three other persons were the robbers, and that the bodies had been conveyed away in a coach to different people for various purposes, as was made appear to them by informations upon oath; the material parts of one of which informations being now read, showed, that within the knowledge of the informant, eight surgeons of public repute, and a man who calls himself an Articulator (and by hand-bills openly avows the trade, exclusive of others of less note) are in the constant habit of buying stolen dead bodies, during the winter half year; in whose service the following fifteen persons are generally employed, namely, Samuel Arnot, alias Harding; John Gilmore, Thomas Gilmore, Thomas Pain, Peter McIntire, alias Mc Intosh, James Profit, Jeremiah Keese, Moris Hogarty, White, a man called Long John the Coachman, John Butler, John Howison, Samuel Hatton, John Parker; and Henry Wheeler, whose depredations have extended to thirty Burial Grounds that the informant knows of; and that grave diggers, and those intrusted with the care of Burial Grounds, are frequently accessory to the robberies, and receive five shillings per Corpse for every one, that with their privily is carried off, by which means many hundreds are taken from their grave annually.") The report into their activities lists a price of two guineas and a crown for a dead body, six shillings for the first foot, and nine pence per inch "for all it measures more in length". These prices were by no means fixed; the black market value of corpses varied considerably. Giving evidence to the 1828 Select Committee on Anatomy, the surgeon Astley Cooper testified that in 1828 the price for a corpse was about eight guineas, but also that he had paid anything from two to fourteen guineas previously; others claimed they had paid up to twenty guineas per corpse. Compared to the five shillings an East End silk weaver could earn each week, or the single guinea a manservant to a wealthy household was paid, these were considerable sums of money and body snatching was therefore a highly profitable business. Surgeons at the Royal College in Edinburgh complained that resurrectionists were profiteering, particularly when local shortages forced prices up. One surgeon told the Select Committee that he thought the body snatchers were manipulating the market for their own benefit, though no criticism was made of the "Anatomy Club", an attempt by anatomists to control the price of corpses for their benefit.

Prices also varied depending on what type of corpse was for sale. With greater opportunity for the study of musculature, males were preferable to females, while freaks were more highly valued. The body of Charles Byrne, the so-called "Irish Giant", fetched about £500 when it was bought by John Hunter. Byrne's skeleton remains on display at the Royal College of Surgeons of England. Children's bodies were also traded, as "big smalls", "smalls" or foetuses. Parts of corpses, such as a scalp with long hair attached, or good quality teeth, also fetched good prices—not because they held any intrinsic value to the anatomist, but rather because they were used to refurbish the living.

"Resurrection was one of the most covert underworld activities of the day, and tantalisingly little about it has ever come to light".

— Sarah Wise

With no reliable figures for the number of dissections that took place in 18th-century Britain, the true scale of body snatching can only be estimated. Richardson suggests that nationally, several thousand bodies were robbed each year. The 1828 Select Committee reported that in 1826, 592 bodies were dissected by 701 students. In 1831, only 52 of 1,601 death penalties handed down were enacted, a number far too small to meet demand. Since corpses were not viewed as property and could neither be owned nor stolen, (Note: For more detail on the legal status of corpses, see Ross, Ian; Ross, Carol Urquhart (Summer 1979), "Body Snatching in Nineteenth Century Britain", British Journal of Law and Society, 6 (1), Wiley: 108–118, doi:10.2307/1409709, JSTOR 1409709) body snatching remained quasi-legal, the crime being committed against the grave rather than the body. On the rare occasions they were caught, resurrectionists might have received a public whipping, or a sentence for crimes against public mores, but generally the practice was treated by the authorities as an open secret and ignored. A notable exception occurred in Great Yarmouth in 1827, with the capture of three resurrectionists. At a time when thieves were regularly transported for theft, two of the body snatchers were discharged and the third, sent to London for trial, was imprisoned for only six months. Resurrectionists were also aided by the corpse's anatomisation; since the process also destroyed the evidence, a successful prosecution was unlikely.

== Resurrection ==
=== Method ===
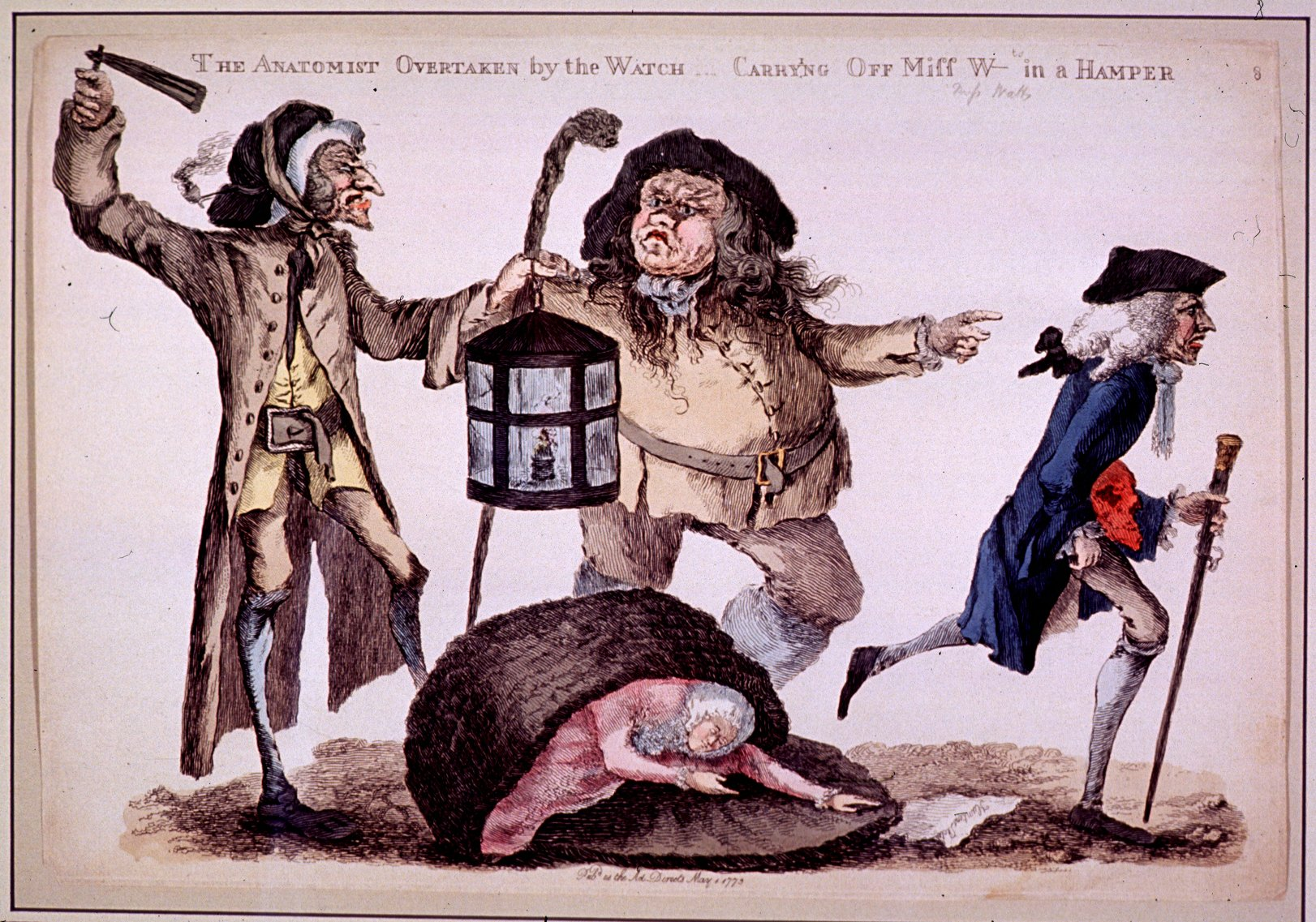
The Anatomist Overtaken by the Watch (1773), by William Austin. A caricature of John Hunter makes his escape from two watchmen.

Resurrectionists usually found corpses through a network of informers. Sextons, gravediggers, undertakers, local officials; each connived to take a cut of the proceeds. Working mostly in small gangs at night with a "dark lanthorn", (Note: A dark lanthorn or dark lantern has a sliding panel that can obscure the light swiftly without extinguishing the flame of the candle within.) their modus operandi was to dig a hole—sometimes using a quieter, wooden spade—down to one end of the coffin. To disguise this activity, the soil was sometimes thrown onto a piece of canvas at the side of the grave. A sound-deadening sack was placed over the lid, which was then lifted. The weight of soil on the remainder of the lid snapped the wood, enabling the robbers to hoist the body out. The corpse was then stripped of its clothing, tied up, and placed into a sack. The entire process could be completed within 30 minutes. Moving the corpse of a pauper was less troublesome, as their bodies were often kept in mass graves, left open to the environment until filled—which often took weeks.

If caught in the act, body snatchers could find themselves at the mercy of the local population. A violent confrontation took place in a Dublin churchyard in 1828, when a party of mourners confronted a group of resurrectionists. The would-be body snatchers withdrew, only to return several hours later with more men. The mourners had also added to their number, and both groups had brought firearms. A "volley of bullets, slugs, and swan-shot from the resurrectionists" prompted a "discharge of fire-arms from the defenders". Close-quarters fighting included the use of pick axes, until the resurrectionists retreated. In the same city, a man caught removing a corpse from a graveyard in Hollywood was shot and killed in 1832. In the same year, three men were apprehended while transporting the bodies of two elderly men, near Deptford in London. As rumours spread that the two corpses were murder victims, a large crowd assembled outside the station house. When the suspects were brought out to be transported to the local magistrates, the approximately 40-strong force of police officers found it difficult to "prevent their prisoners being sacrificed by the indignant multitude, which was most anxious to inflict such punishment upon them as it thought they deserved."

=== Gangs ===
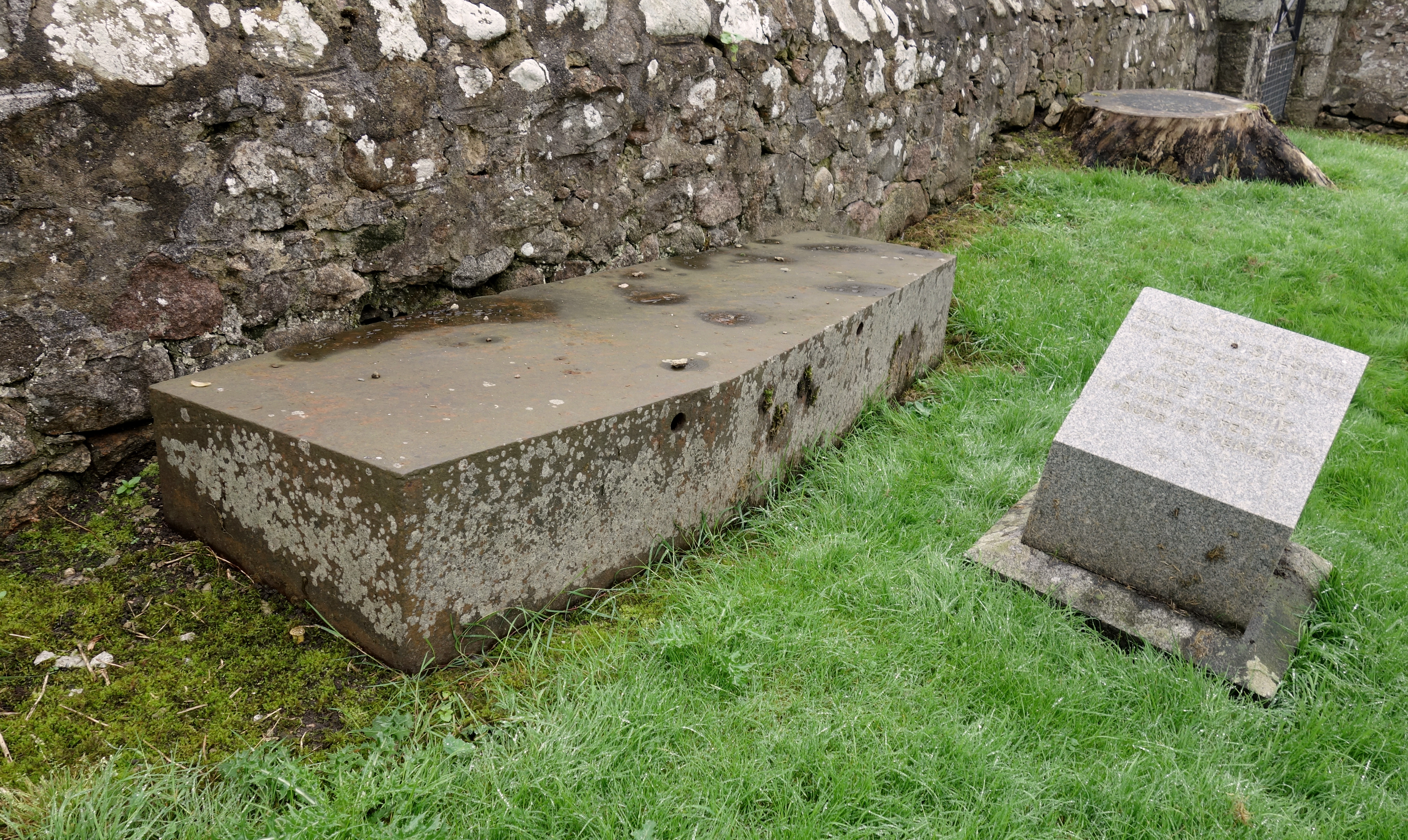
A mortsafe in Banchory-Devenick, Scotland

As many as seven gangs of resurrectionists may have been at work in 1831. The 1828 Select Committee on Anatomy estimated that there were about 200 London resurrectionists, most of them working part-time. The London Borough Gang, which operated from about 1802 to 1825, at its peak consisted of at least six men, led first by a former hospital porter named Ben Crouch, and later by a man called Patrick Murphy. Under the protection of Astley Cooper, Crouch's gang supplied some of London's biggest anatomical schools, but relations were not always amicable. In 1816 the gang cut off supplies to the St Thomas Hospital School, demanding an increase of two guineas per corpse. When the school responded by using freelancers, members of the gang burst into the dissecting rooms, threatened the students and attacked the corpses. The police were called, but worried about adverse publicity, the school paid their attackers' bail and opened negotiations. The gang also attempted to put rivals out of business, sometimes by desecrating a graveyard (thereby rendering it unsafe to rob graves from for weeks thereafter) and other times by reporting freelance resurrectionists to the police, recruiting them once freed from prison. Joshua Naples, who wrote The Diary of a Resurrectionist, a list of his activities from 1811 to 1812, (Note: Anatomical sessions took place from October to May, and Naples' book therefore contains no entries for May, June and July 1812.) was one such individual. Among entries detailing the graveyards he plundered, the institutions he delivered to, how much he was paid and his drunkenness, Naples diary mentions his gang's inability to work under a full Moon, being unable to sell a body deemed "putrid", and leaving a body thought to be infected with smallpox.

Violent mobs were not the only problems body snatchers faced. Naples also wrote of how he met "patrols" and how "dogs flew at us", references to some of the measures taken to secure graves against his ilk. The aristocracy and very rich placed their dead in triple coffins, vaults and private chapels, sometimes guarded by servants. For the less wealthy, double coffins were available, buried on private land in deep graves. More basic defences included placing heavy weights over the coffin, or simply filling the grave with stones rather than soil. Such deterrents were sometimes deployed in vain; at least one London graveyard was owned by an anatomist who, it was reported, "obtained a famous supply [of cadavers] ... and he could charge pretty handsomely for burying a body there, and afterwards get from his pupils from eight to twelve guineas for taking it up again!" Ever more elaborate creations included The Patent Coffin, an iron contraption with concealed springs to prevent any levering of its lid. Corpses were sometimes secured inside their caskets by iron straps, while other designs used special screws to reinforce metal bands placed around the coffin. In Scotland, iron cages called mortsafes either encased buried coffins, or were set in a concrete foundation and covered the whole grave. (Note: The Oxford English Dictionary's historical definition of mortsafe is "an iron frame placed over a coffin or at the entrance to a grave as a protection against resurrectionists in Scotland.") Some covered more than one coffin, while others took the form of iron lattices fixed beneath large stone slabs, buried with the coffin. They may not have been secure enough; as one 20th-century writer observed, an empty coffin found beneath a buried mortsafe in Aberlour had probably been "opened during the night succeeding the funeral, and carefully closed again, so that the disturbance of the soil had escaped notice or had been attributed to the original burial."

=== Other methods ===
Occasionally, resurrectionists paid women to pose as grieving relatives, so that they might claim a body from a workhouse. Some parishes did little to stop this practice, as it reduced their funeral expenditure. Bodies were also taken from dead houses; Astley Cooper's servant was once forced to return three bodies, worth £34 2s, to a dead house in Newington parish. Bribes were also paid, usually to servants of recently deceased employers then lying in state, although this method carried its own risks as corpses were often placed on public display before they were buried. Some were taken from private homes; in 1831 The Times reported that "a party of resurrectionists" burst into a house in Bow Lane and took the body of an elderly woman, who was being "'waked' by her friends and neighbours". The thieves apparently "acted with the most revolting indecency, dragging the corpse in its death clothes after them through the mud in the street". Bodies were even removed—with no legal authority—from prisons and naval and military hospitals.

While some surgeons eschewed human cadavers in favour of facsimiles, plaster casts, wax models and animals, bodies were also taken from hospital burial grounds. Recent excavations at the Royal London Hospital appear to support claims made almost 200 years earlier that the hospital's school was "entirely supplied by subjects, which have been their own patients".

== Dissection and anatomy ==
=== Public view ===
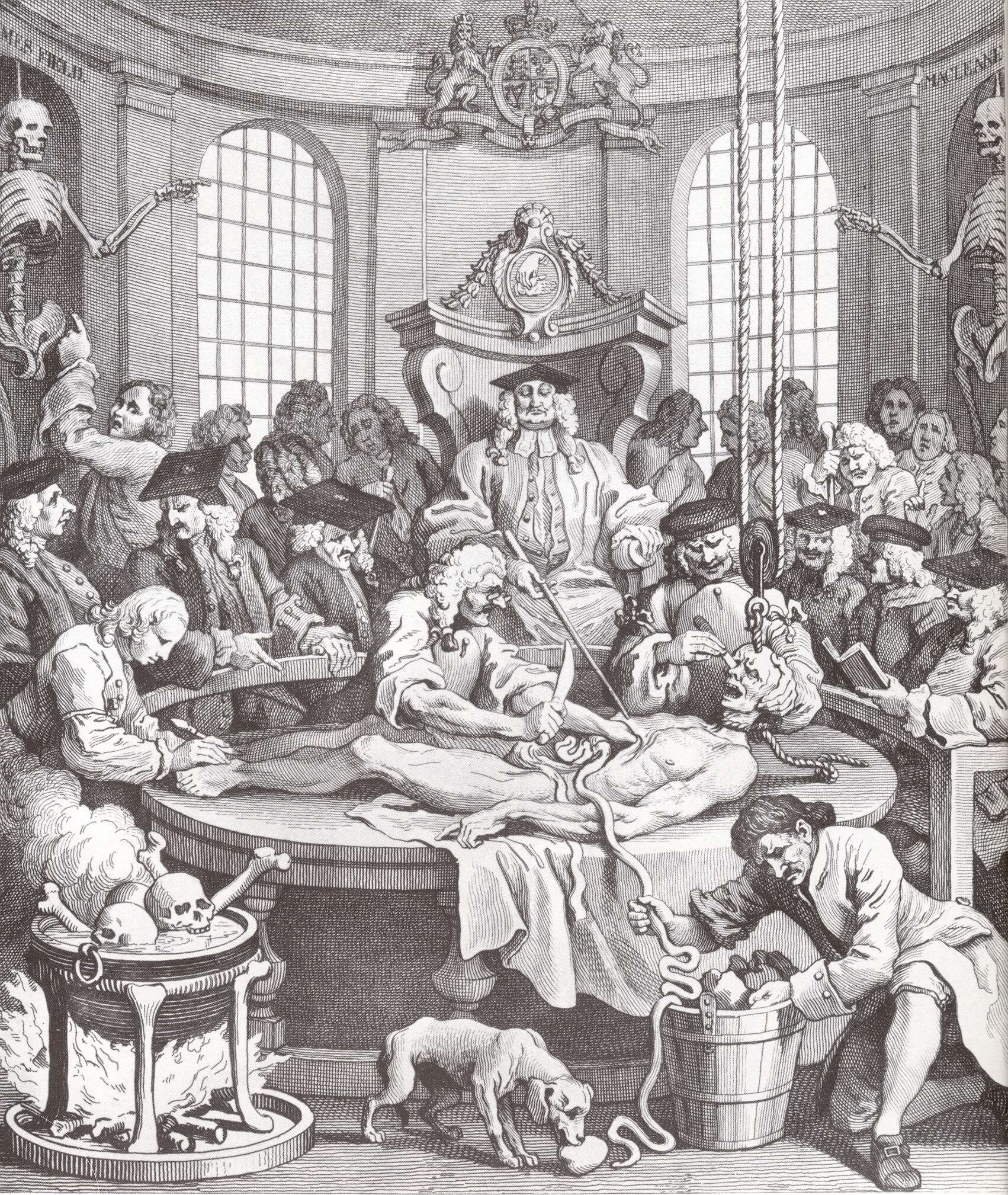
The Reward of Cruelty (1751) by William Hogarth. A criminal is dissected by surgeons. The image contains several references to popular superstitions regarding the human corpse and its treatment by English law.

The moving in 1783 of London's executions, from Tyburn to Newgate Prison, reduced the likelihood of public interference and strengthened the authorities' hold over felons. However, society's view of dissection remained unequivocal; most preferred gibbeting to the laying open of a corpse. Martin Gray, sentenced to death in 1721 for returning early from transportation, was "greatly frighted, least his Body should be cut, and torn, and mangled after Death, and had sent his Wife to his Uncle to obtain some money to prevent it." Vincent Davis, convicted in 1725 of murdering his wife, said he would rather be "hang'd in Chains" than "anatomiz'd", and to that effect had "sent many Letters to all his former Friends and Acquaintance to form a Company, and prevent the Surgeons in their Designs upon his Body". There are cases of criminals who survived the short drop, but dissecting the body removed any hope of escape from death's embrace. Anatomists were popularly thought to be interested in dissection only as enactors of the law, a relationship first established by kings James IV and Henry VIII. Thomas Wakley, editor of The Lancet, wrote that this lowered "the character of the profession in the public mind." It was also thought that the anatomists' work made the body's owner unrecognisable in the afterlife. Therefore, while less hated than the resurrectionists they employed, anatomists remained at risk of attack. Relatives of a man executed in 1820 killed one anatomist and shot another in the face, while in 1831, following the discovery of buried human flesh and three dissected bodies, a mob burnt down an anatomy theatre in Aberdeen. The theatre's proprietor, Andrew Moir, escaped through a window, while two of his students were chased through the streets.

Some aspects of the popular view of dissection were exemplified by the final panel of William Hogarth's The Four Stages of Cruelty, a series of engravings that depict a felon's journey to the anatomical theatre. The chief surgeon (John Freke) appears as a magistrate, watching over the examination of the murderer Tom Nero's body by the Company of Surgeons. According to author Fiona Haslam, the scene reflects a popular view that surgeons were "on the whole, disreputable, insensitive to human suffering and prone to victimis[ing] people in the same way that criminals victimised their prey." Another popular belief alluded to by Hogarth was that surgeons were so ignorant of the respect due to their subjects, that they allowed the remains to become offal. In reality, the rough treatment exacted by body snatchers on corpses continued on the premises they delivered to. Joshua Brookes once admitted that he had kicked a corpse in a sack down a flight of stairs, while Robert Christison complained of the "shocking indecency without any qualifying wit" demonstrated by a male lecturer who dissected a woman. Pranks were also common; a London student who jokingly dropped an amputated leg down a household chimney, into a housewife's stewpot, caused a riot.

=== Anatomy Act 1832 ===
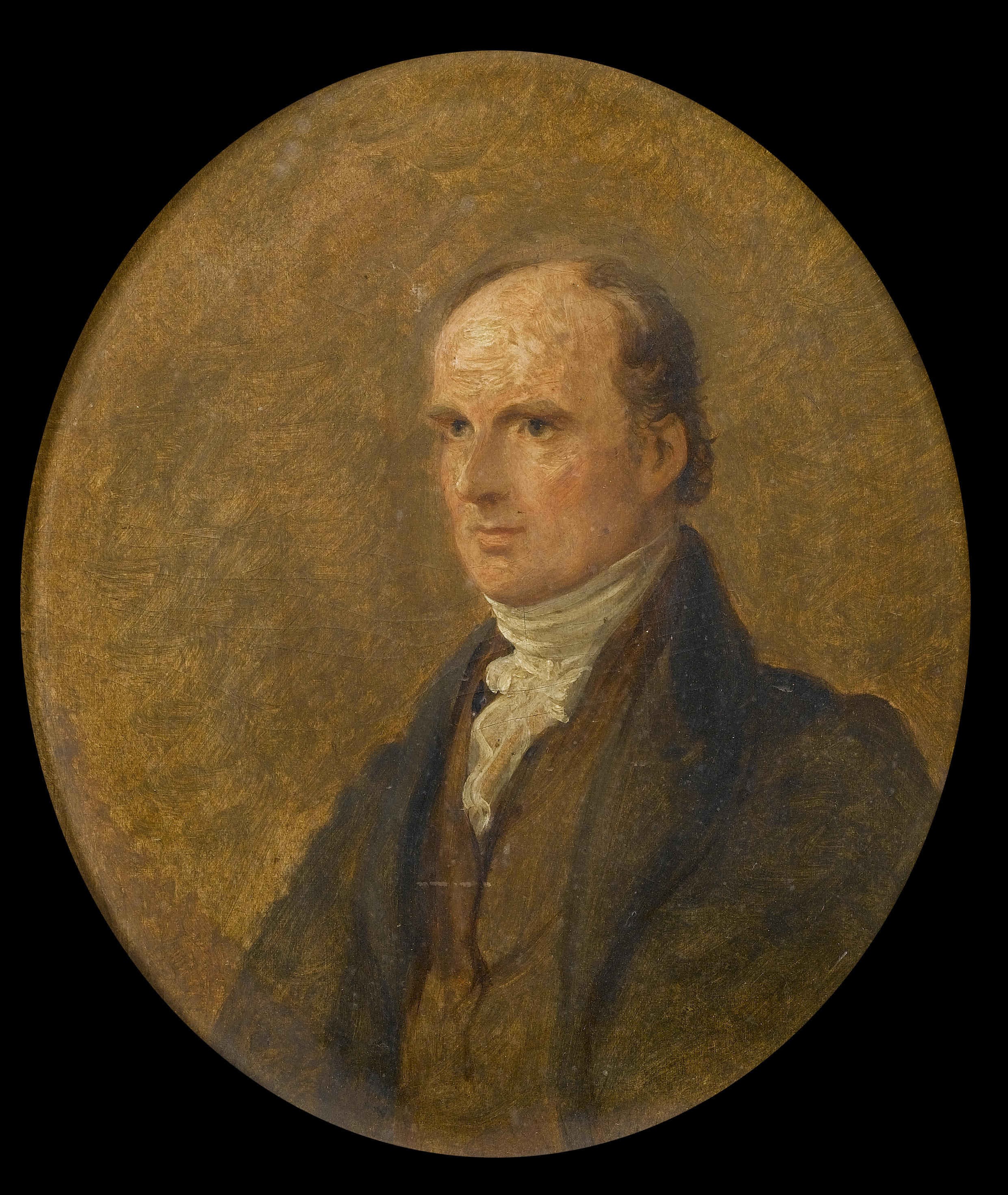
Henry Warburton (1833), by George Hayter. Warburton authored the 1828 Select Committee on Anatomy's report and also presented two bills to Parliament, the second of which became the Anatomy Act 1832.

In March 1828, in Liverpool, three defendants charged with conspiracy and unlawfully procuring and receiving a corpse buried in Warrington were acquitted, while the remaining two were found guilty of possession. The presiding judge's comment, that "the disinterment of bodies for dissection was an offence liable to punishment", prompted Parliament to establish the 1828 Select Committee on Anatomy. (Note: The committee's administrative records were lost in the 1834 Burning of Parliament and only its minutes and report are extant.) The committee took evidence from 40 witnesses: 25 members of the medical profession, 12 public servants and 3 resurrectionists, who remained anonymous. Discussed were the importance of anatomy, the supply of subjects for dissection and the relationship between anatomists and resurrectionists. The committee concluded that dissection was essential to the study of human anatomy and recommended that anatomists be allowed to appropriate the bodies of paupers.

The first bill was presented to Parliament in 1829 by Henry Warburton, author of the Select Committee's report. Following a spirited defence of the poor by peers in the House of Lords, it was withdrawn, (Note: The Archbishop of Canterbury, Earls of Malmesbury and Harewood, and the Lord Chief Justice, Lord Tenterden, argued that the poor had a right to a decent burial and questioned if people who had broken no laws should be classed alongside murderers. An "unconquerable objection" to dissection held by many paupers was also mentioned.) but almost two years later Warburton introduced a second bill, shortly after the execution of John Bishop and Thomas Williams. The London Burkers, as the two men were known, were inspired by a series of murders committed by William Burke and William Hare, two Irishmen who sold their victims' bodies to Robert Knox, a Scottish surgeon. Even though Burke and Hare never robbed graves, their case lowered the public's view of resurrectionists from desecraters to potential murderers. The resulting wave of social anxiety helped speed Warburton's bill through Parliament, and despite much public opprobrium, with little Parliamentary opposition the Anatomy Act 1832 became law on 1 August 1832. It abolished that part of the 1752 Act that allowed murderers to be dissected, ending the centuries-old tradition of anatomising felons, although it neither discouraged nor prohibited body snatching, or the sale of corpses (whose legal status remained uncertain). (Note: The Act left Burking, the crime that had helped push Warburton's bill through Parliament, still feasible.) Another clause allowed a person's body to be given up for "anatomical examination", provided that the person concerned had not objected. As the poor were often barely literate and therefore unable to leave written directions in the event of their death, this meant that masters of charitable institutions such as workhouses decided who went to the anatomist's table. A stipulation that witnesses could intervene was also abused, as such witnesses might be fellow inmates who were powerless to object, or workhouse staff who stood to gain money through wilful ignorance.

Despite the passage of the Anatomy Act, resurrection remained commonplace, the supply of unclaimed paupers' bodies at first proving inadequate to fulfil the demand. Reports of body snatching persisted for some years; in 1838, Poor Law Commissioners reported on two dead resurrectionists who had contracted an illness from a putrid corpse they had unearthed. By 1844, the trade mostly no longer existed. An isolated case was noted in Sheffield, Wardsend Cemetery in 1862.

== See also ==
- Anatomy murder
- History of anatomy
- The Fortune of War Public House, a pub famous for its role as a meeting place where resurrectionists would sell cadavers to surgeons
- Jerry Cruncher, a resurrectionist featured in Charles Dickens' novel A Tale of Two Cities
