= Clatt (disambiguation) =

Clatt may refer to:

- Clatt, village in Aberdeenshire, Scotland
- Clatt Primary School, primary school in Clatt
- Corwin Clatt (1924–1997), American football player
