= Morthouse =

Building for the storage of bodies awaiting burial

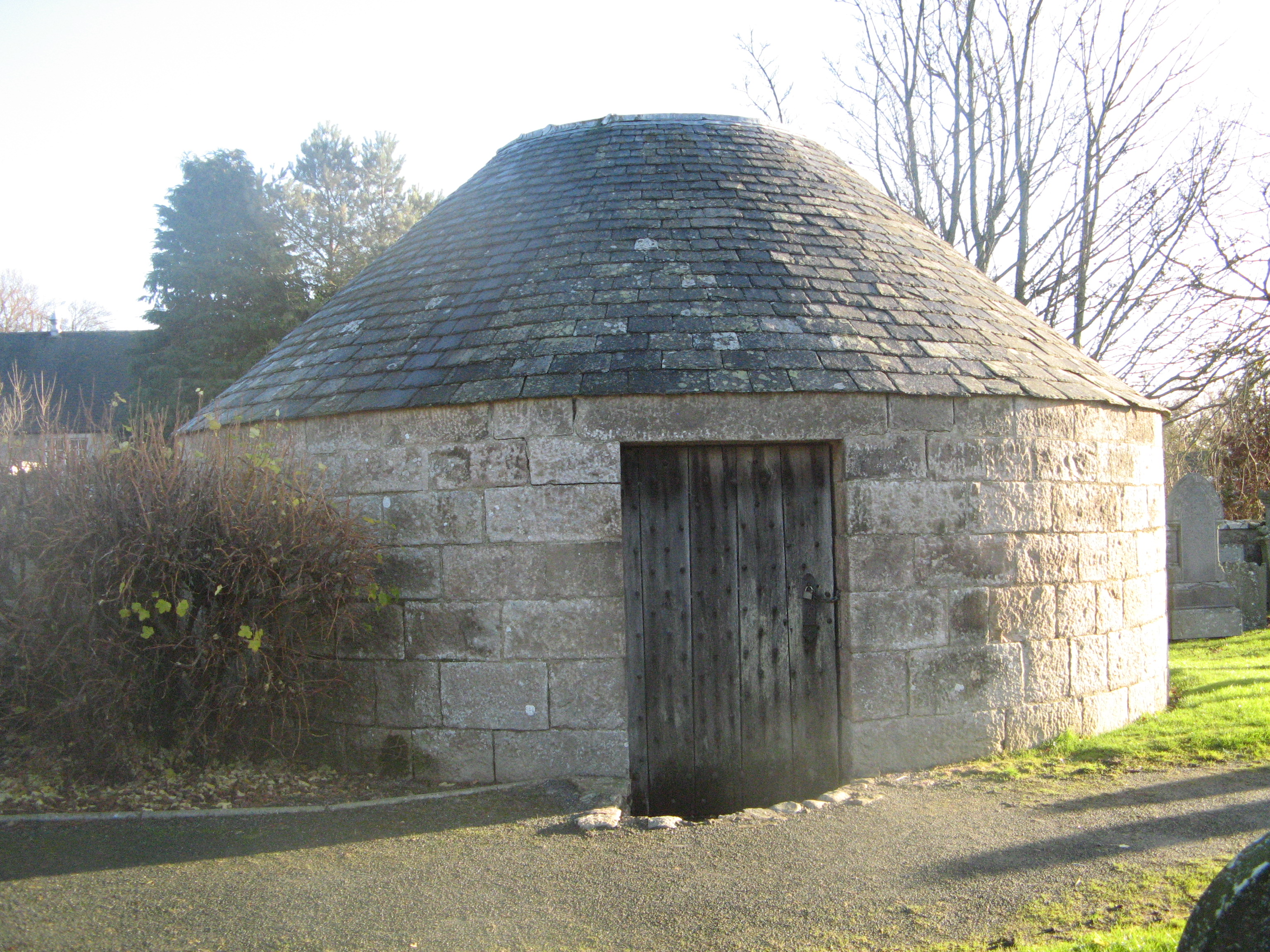
The unusual circular morthouse at Udny in Aberdeenshire.

A morthouse or deadhouse was a specialised secure building usually located in a churchyard where bodies were temporarily interred before a formal funeral took place. These buildings date back to the time when bodysnatchers or resurrectionists frequently illegally exhumed dead bodies that were then sold for dissection as part of human anatomy training at universities, etc. Morthouses were alternatives to mortsafes, watch houses, watch towers, etc.

A morthouse differs from a mortuary or morgue, which is a facility for the storage of human corpses awaiting identification or autopsy prior to burial.

== Graveyard security ==
The Christian tradition at the time was that resurrection after death and entry into the afterlife required the body of the deceased to be whole at burial so that person could enter the kingdom of Heaven for eternal life complete in body and soul. The dissection of the corpses of hanged criminals was viewed in this context as part of the punishment. The level of security depended upon the financial means of the deceased's family, the wealth of the parish, etc.

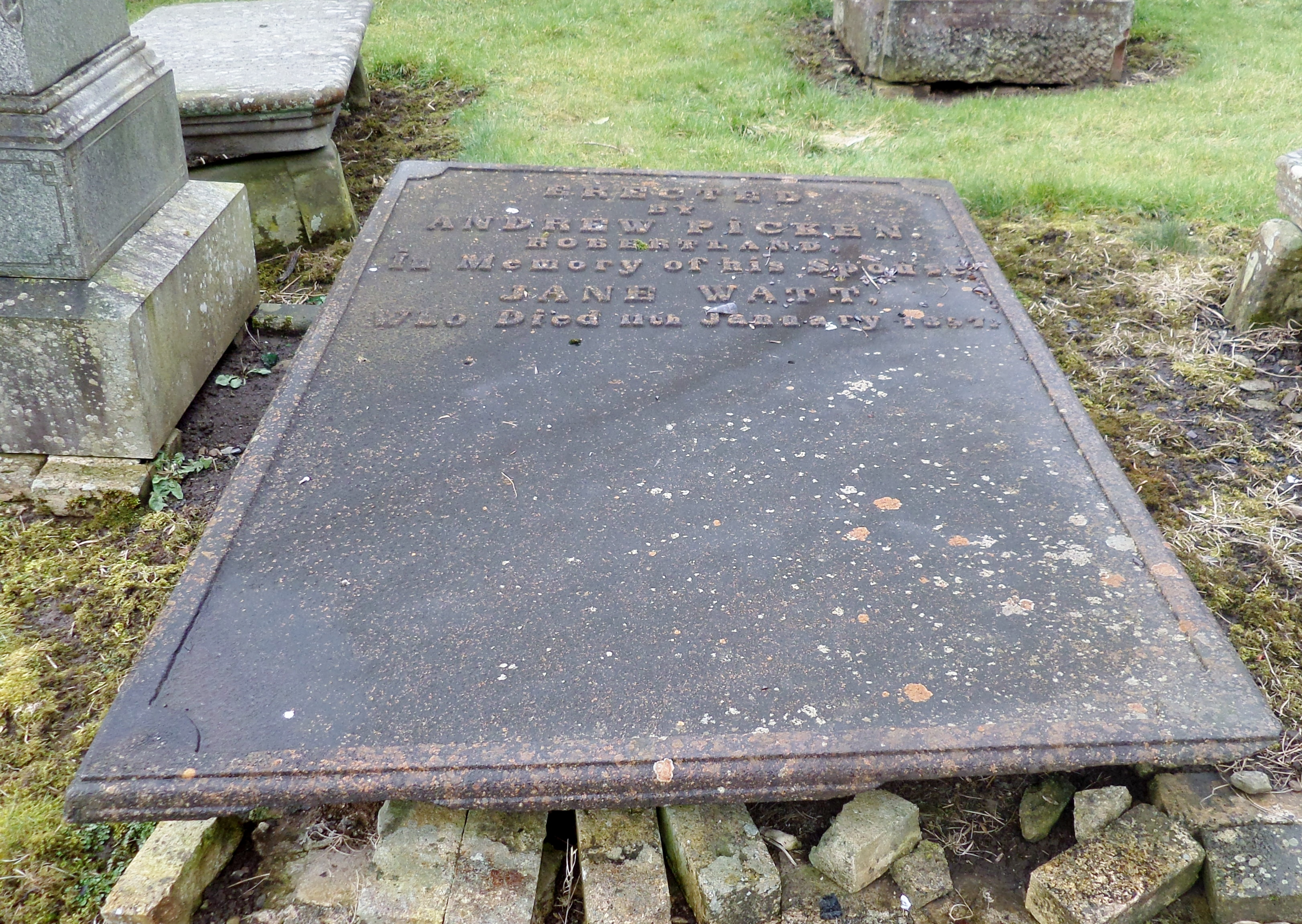
Cast iron mortsafe tombstone, St Columba's Kirk, Stewarton.

Simpler techniques than morthouses to protect the recently deceased included the family acting as lookouts, high graveyard walls with locked gates, especially deep graves and even using heather, turf, stones, etc. mixed in with the grave's soil to make digging difficult and time consuming. Heavy mortstones could be placed over the grave and even the gravestone itself could be used as a deterrent, such as the especially large solid cast-iron example at St Columba's in Stewarton, Ayrshire (see photograph).

== Incentives for bodysnatching ==
The law had previously been ill-suited to deal with the problem as the crime of theft only applies to property and the deceased are not defined as property, special care being taken to leave behind rings, mortcloths, etc. Belatedly the Anatomy Act 1832 codified the use of bodies for dissection, etc. and morthouses, etc therefore ceased to have a distinct purpose, the peak time of body snatching being from the 1730s until 1832.

In the early 19th century bodysnatching was such a lucrative trade that devising of methods to prevent the taking of fresh corpses became essential. Large sums of money were paid for the recently deceased as the students were largely better off individuals at the time who could afford significant fees and university anatomy departments could otherwise only legally obtain corpses of criminals who had been hanged. Some of the poorer medical students were even involved in the supply of corpses to their colleagues.

The requirement for corpses to be in good anatomical condition lent itself to methods of delaying burial until the bodies were of no dissection value in buildings with prison-like security systems in place.

== Characteristics of morthouses ==
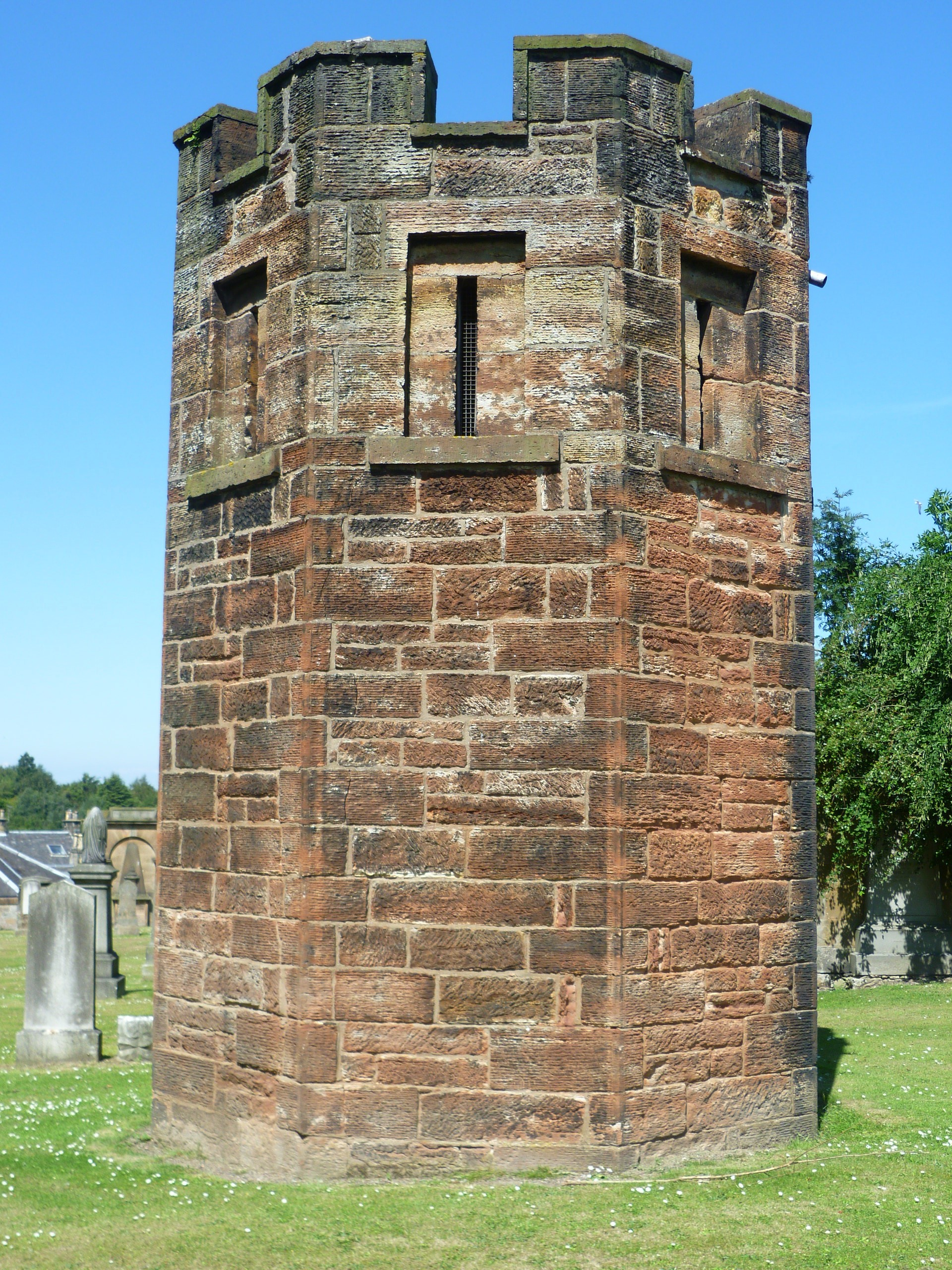
A watch tower at Dalkeith

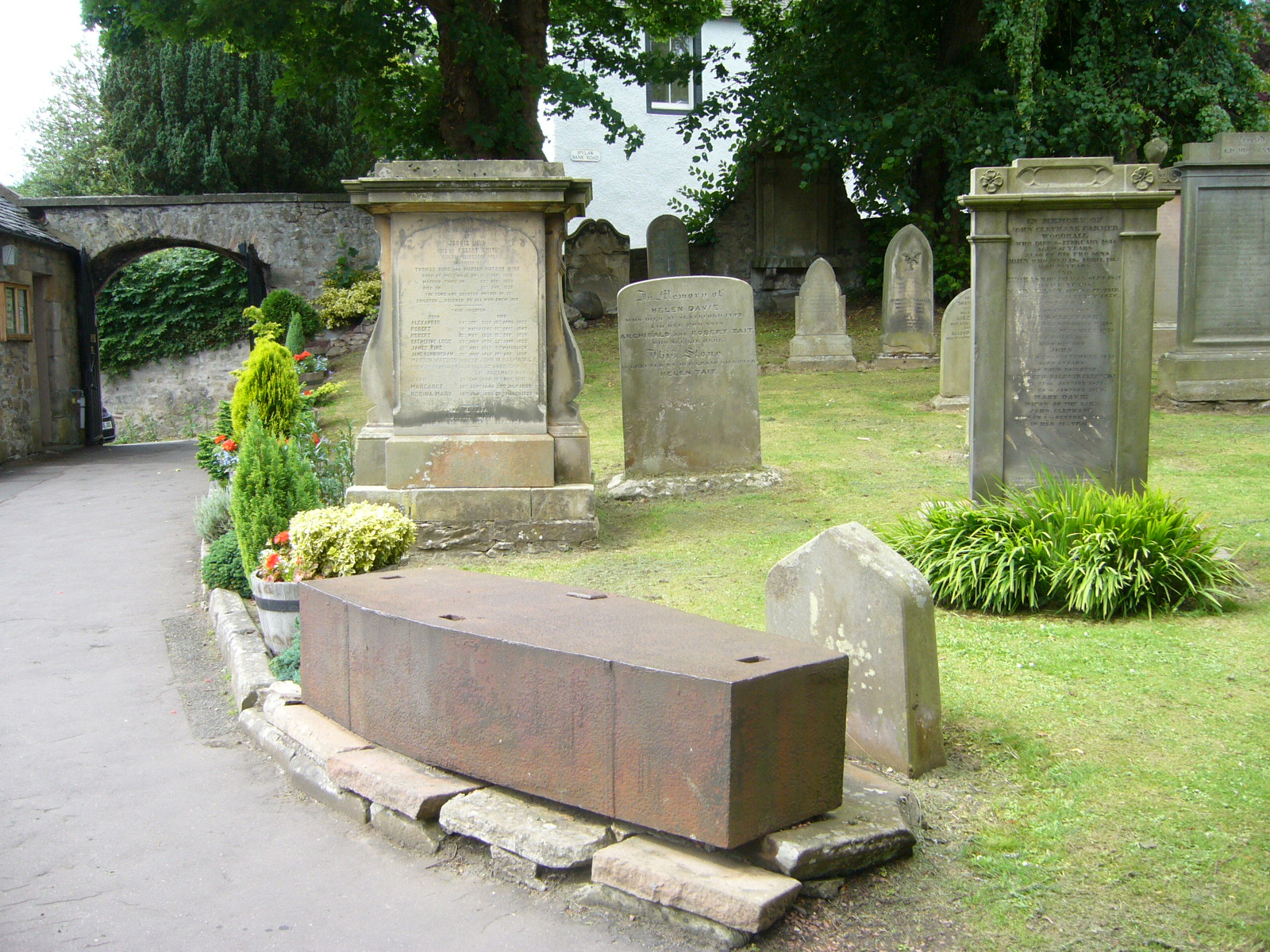
A metal coffin mortsafe at Colinton near Edinburgh.

Morthouses usually did away with the expense of employing watchmen and money was therefore invested in making such buildings as secure as possible with thick stone walls, no windows, metal inner doors and outer doors with extra metal reinforcement to the locks and the wooden body of the door. A lack of ornamentation was common and few had inscriptions other than the date of construction.

The Culsalmond vault in Aberdeenshire had an iron door with four locks and the four keys were held by four annually elected individuals.

Some morthouses were built up against existing structures such as the graveyard wall to save on construction costs. A number of morthouses were built partly underground or were effectively subterranean to give added security, some were lead-lined to prevent water seeping into the vault and air vents were a common feature. Massive walls were typical if the building was at ground level and one example was circular to make breaking through the wall more difficult. Many had shelves for the coffins and some had rollers for ease of movement of the heavy wooden coffins so that the least physical contact was required.

The cadavers in their coffins were generally left in the morthouse for up to six weeks in summer months and for as long as three months in winter.

At Udny Mort House in Scotland, rules stipulated the secure construction of coffins that had to be air-tight. Corpses that were "infectious or otherwise dangerous" were required to be enveloped in lead or tin plate.

Use was by subscription or by payment of a fee.

== Some surviving examples of morthouses ==
In Scotland the morthouses are mainly located in the North-East in an area from Crail in the South to Marnock in the North. A few isolated examples are also found in places such as Edinburgh and two examples survive in Ayrshire at Mauchline and Dreghorn. Most old morthouses are used for storage or have been abandoned, whilst a few have been adapted for other purposes.

- Belhelvie (NJ9417) – dating from 1835. A solid arched structure with a slate roof. Built of granite blocks, with a single doorway and double doors. Two shelves on each side have rollers for easy positioning of coffins. An iron sheet with a secure lock formed the inner door and the outer door is thick oak with metal studs and two locks. The keyholes are covered and protected by two iron bars that were hinged and were in turn padlocked.

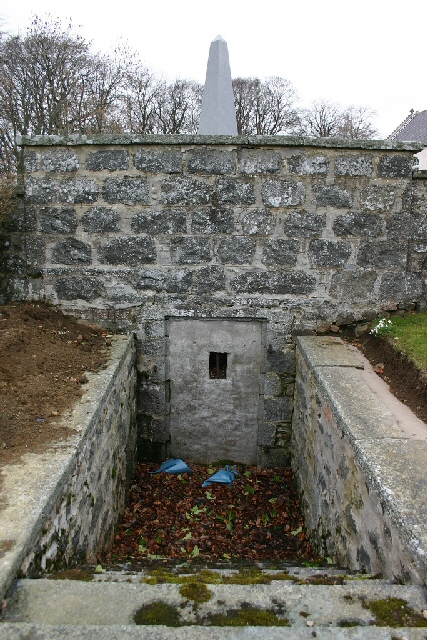
The morthouse at Clatt, its entrance now blocked

- Clatt, Aberdeenshire (NJ539259) – a subterranean morthouse accessed via a flight of steps. The entrance has been bricked up. Corpses were in great demand for use at the nearby Aberdeen medical schools.
- Collace (NO197319) – reported as awaiting restoration.
- Cowie (NO884873) – a subterranean morthouse with the entrance door now buried.
- Crail (NO613079) – dated 1826 with an inscription "ERECTED for securing the DEAD". It is rectangular with ornamental battlements, ventilation slits, a substantial stone construction and a single solid door.
- Cramond (NT189768) – a likely morthouse in Crammond Kirk cemetery, now housing electrical equipment.
- Coull (NJ511024) – built into a slope, this substantial morthouse has a barrel vault and a turf-covered roof.

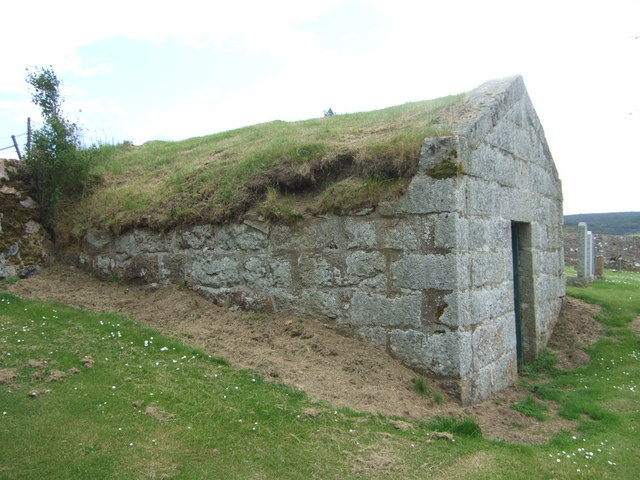
Coull Morthouse

- Dreghorn (NS351382) – sponsored by Archibald Montgomerie, Earl of Eglinton, the church is an unusual octagonal shape. The small school building of 1774 was in the 19th century used as a morthouse and a mortuary, with a room for each, later being used as the kirk session house.
- Hatton of Fintray (NJ840165) – dated 1830, it lies partly underground. It was lead-lined to prevent moisture ingress. Coffins sat on iron shelving.
- Kemnay (NJ733161) – dated to 1831, this bunker-like turf covered building used to be lead-lined, reportedly to prevent mould. It has an iron bar securing the metal door and has two coffin shelves with rollers.
- Kirkton of Culsamond (NJ650329) – an unusual combined morthouse and watch tower. The morthouse is built into the slope and had an outer wooden door and an inner metal door.
- Lennel (NT857411) – In 1821, a mort house was built inside this abandoned church at the west end of the nave, utilising some existing walling.
- Grange of Lindores (NO259163) – located in Abdie Old Kirk. Rectangular and now used to display a Pictish stone.
- Luncarty (NO094300) – a rectangular rubble-built structure with a barrel-shaped roof in good condition.
- Marnoch (NJ595499) – an 1832 dual morthouse and watch tower.

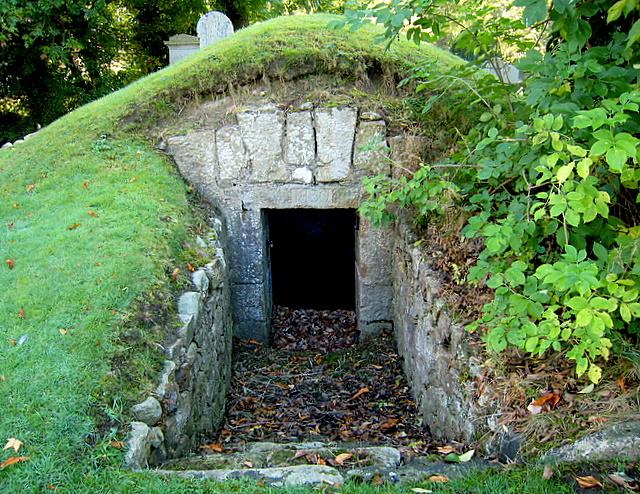
Hatton of Fintray morthouse.

Marykirk (NO686655) – the turf covering has been removed, exposing the rubble fill over the stone-vaulted roof.

- Mauchline (NS498272) – a rectangular slate roofed building with several air vents and partly subterranean, being built into the graveyard from the west side and said to have been constructed originally for cholera victims. In the 19th century an asiatic cholera outbreak reached the United Kingdom and by 1832 it was at Exeter in Devon, reaching Kilmarnock in July 1832.
- Monikie (NO518388) – double wooden doors, ventilation slit, rectangular with a slated roof.
- Redgorton, Gowrie, Perth and Kinross (NO083283) – the church has been converted into flats, and the 1832-dated morthouse is of a massive construction.
- Rosyth (NT085828) – a rectangular building built into the slope at the corner of the churchyard; window boarded up and the roof grassed over.

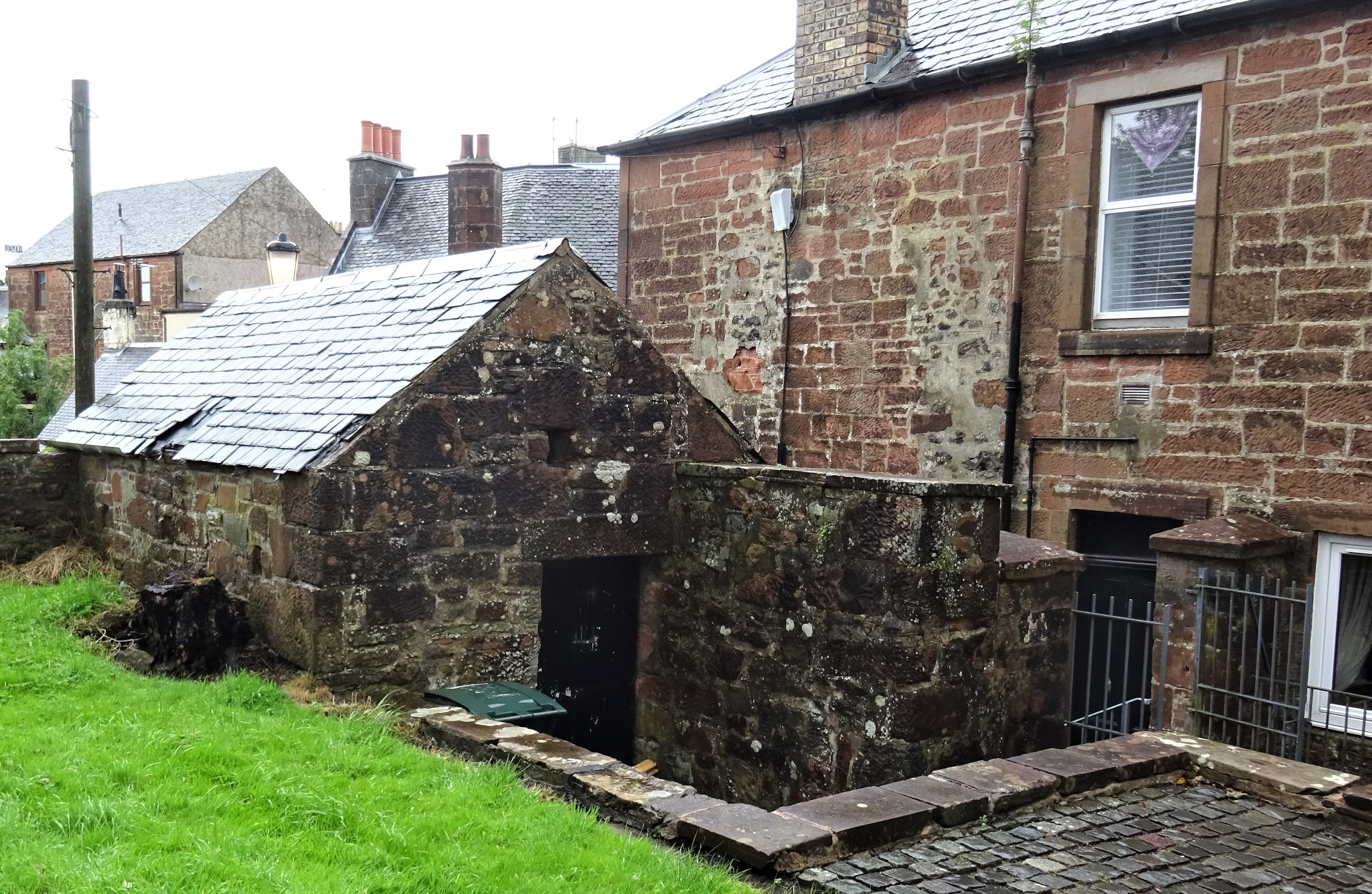
The morthouse at Mauchline.

- Spynie (NJ288654) – once possessed a metal frame roof, has ventilation strips and three shelves for coffins.
- Udny Green (NJ879264), Aberdeenshire – dating from 1832. A circular construction, rather than the usual rectangular, granite-built vault with a slate roof. A double-layered oak outer door studded with iron bolts and a keyhole protected by a hinged iron secured by a padlock. An iron sheet vertically sliding into a pair of grooves is an unusual feature. The circular wooden platform on which the coffins were laid revolves on a central stone pillar, and coffins were manoeuvred onto the platform that was then moved to make room for another coffin and so on. There were four key holders, including the local minister. It cost £114, covered by subscription. No body was permitted to remain beyond three months.
