= Mortsafe =

Contraption for protecting graves

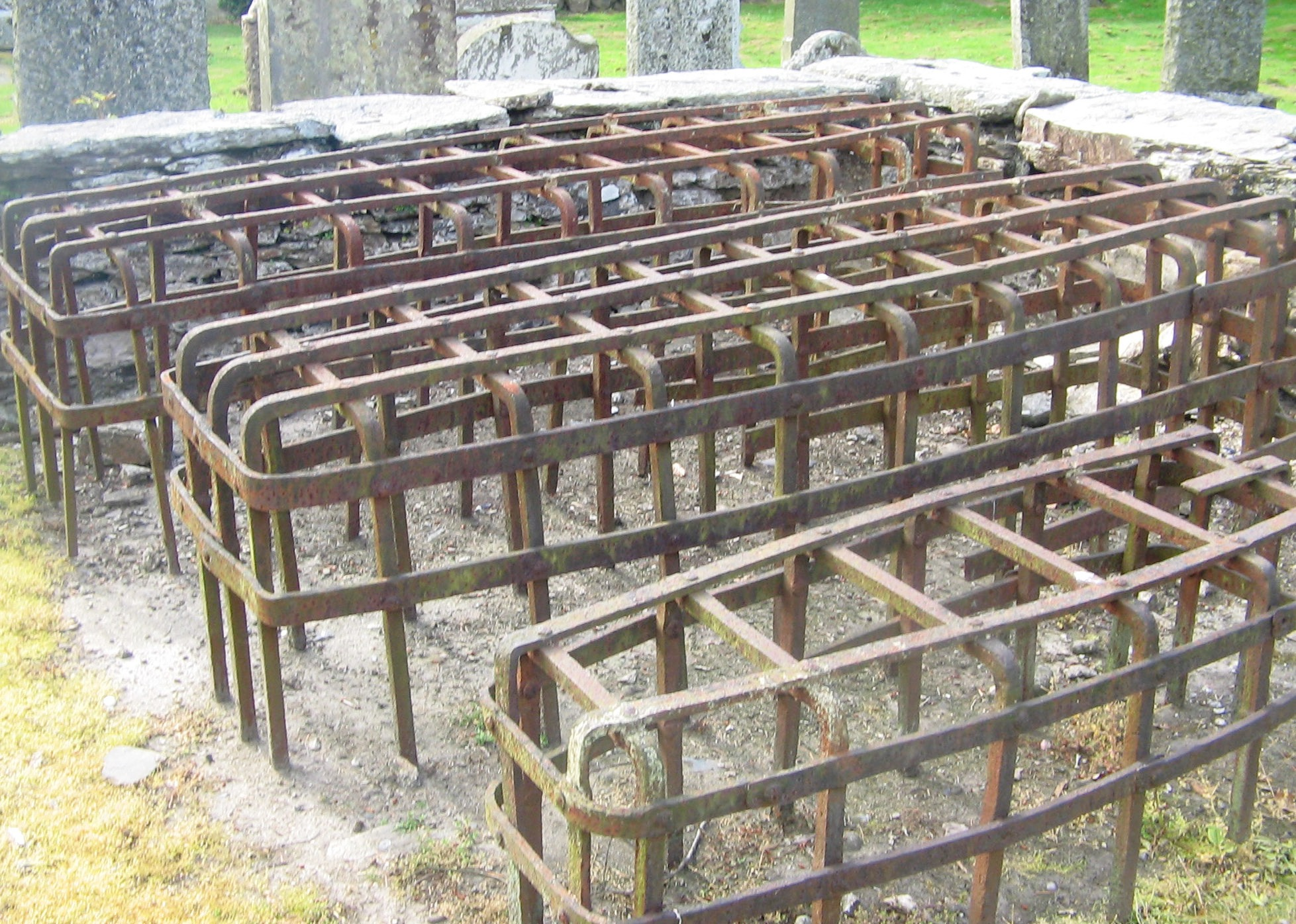
Mortsafes at a church yard in Logierait, Perthshire, Scotland

A mortsafe or mortcage was a construction designed to protect graves from disturbance, used in the United Kingdom. Resurrectionists had supplied schools of anatomy since the early 18th century. This was due to the necessity for medical students to learn anatomy by attending dissections of human subjects, which was frustrated by the very limited allowance of dead bodies – like the corpses of executed criminals, other deceased prisoners and suicide victims – granted by the government, which controlled the supply.

== Official inaction ==
Before the Anatomy Act of 1832, people wishing to study anatomy were restricted in their resources, with too much demand for corpses to dissect against a lack of bodies despite the Murder Act 1751, which provided surgeons with the bodies of criminals. Two categories of body snatchers emerged from this crisis: the surgeons, who stole for themselves or their professors, and resurrectionists, outlaws who were hired to steal bodies and convey them from place to place, even across the sea, for sale to medical schools.

The British authorities turned a blind eye to grave-rifling, the body-snatchers working in a grey area, as the bodies were not considered under traditional theft laws. Despite the authorities inaction, cases of grave-robbing that came to light caused public outrage, particularly in Scotland, where there was great reverence for the dead and belief in the Resurrection. It was popularly believed that the dead could not rise in an incomplete state, which explained the determination to avoid possible desecrations. This led to riots, damage to property and even fatal attacks towards body-snatchers.

== Precautions ==
People were determined to protect the graves of newly deceased friends and relatives. The rich could afford heavy table tombstones, vaults, mausoleums and iron cages around graves. The poor began to place flowers and pebbles on graves to detect disturbances. They dug heather and branches into the soil to make disinterment more difficult. Large stones, often coffin-shaped, sometimes the gift of a wealthy man to the parish, were placed over new graves.

Friends and relatives took turns or hired men to watch graves through the hours of darkness for days, until the body had decomposed enough to be useless to body-snatchers.

Publicity surrounding the crimes of Burke and Hare heightened the fear felt by many people, leading to more measures to fight against body-snatching.

== Mortsafe ==
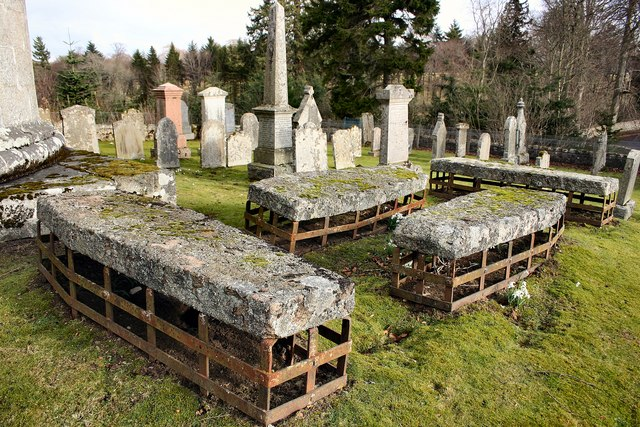
Mortsafes in Cluny kirkyard

The mortsafe was invented in the early 19th century. These were iron or iron-and-stone devices of great weight, in many different designs. Often they were complex heavy iron contraptions of rods and plates, padlocked together. A plate was placed over the coffin, and rods with heads were pushed through holes in it. These rods were kept in place by locking a second plate over the first, to form extremely heavy protection.

They were placed over the coffins for about six weeks, then removed for further use when the body inside was sufficiently decayed. The mortsafe would then be dug up to be used again. Sometimes a church bought them and hired them out. Societies were formed to purchase them and control their use, with annual membership fees, and charges made to non-members.

== Vaults and watch-houses ==
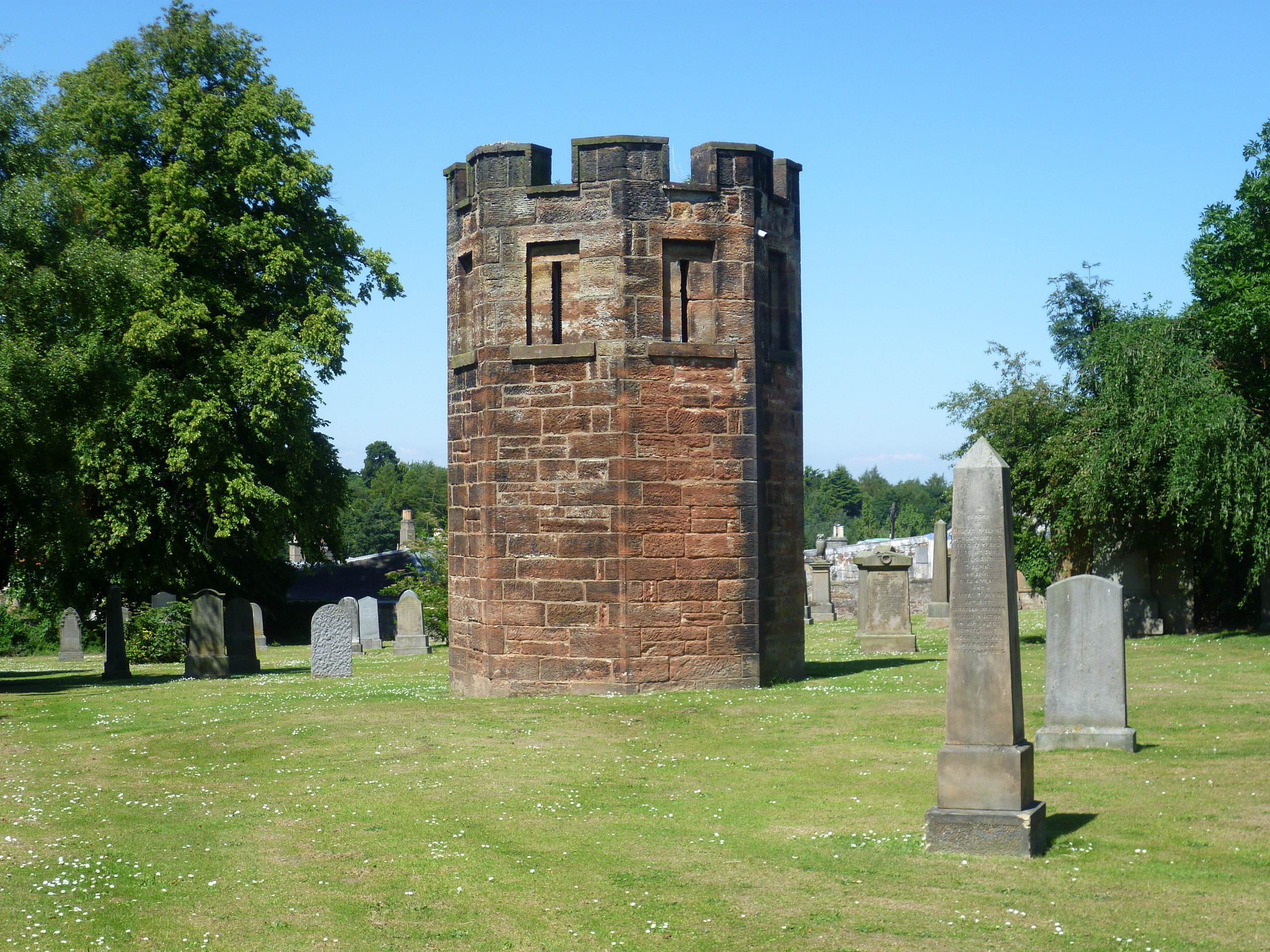
A watchtower built in Dalkeith town cemetery, near Edinburgh, in 1827.

In addition to mortsafes, vaults (also known as morthouses), were built. The vaults were used to store coffins until it was safe to bury them elsewhere. Some of these were above ground. Others – mainly in Aberdeenshire – were wholly or partly underground.

In one Aberdeenshire village, Udny Green, the morthouse is a circular building with a thick studded wooden door and an inner iron door. Inside there is a turntable to accommodate seven coffins. A coffin would be moved round as further ones were added. By the time it reappeared, the body would be of no use to the dissectionists.

Watch-houses were sometimes erected to shelter the watchers. One watch-house in Edinburgh is a three-storey castellated building with windows. Watching societies were often formed in towns, one in Glasgow having 2,000 members. Many kirk session houses were used by watchers, but graves were still violated.

Before all these measures, an easier approach was the mortstone: the soil would be heavily compacted while filling the grave to make digging more difficult, with heavy stones, known as mortstones, placed on top.

== Disuse ==
In the end, these practices began to disappear with the Anatomy Act 1832, which provided surgeons with more corpses. The mortsafes were disposed of or broken up for their iron, with some of them left behind.

== Surviving examples ==
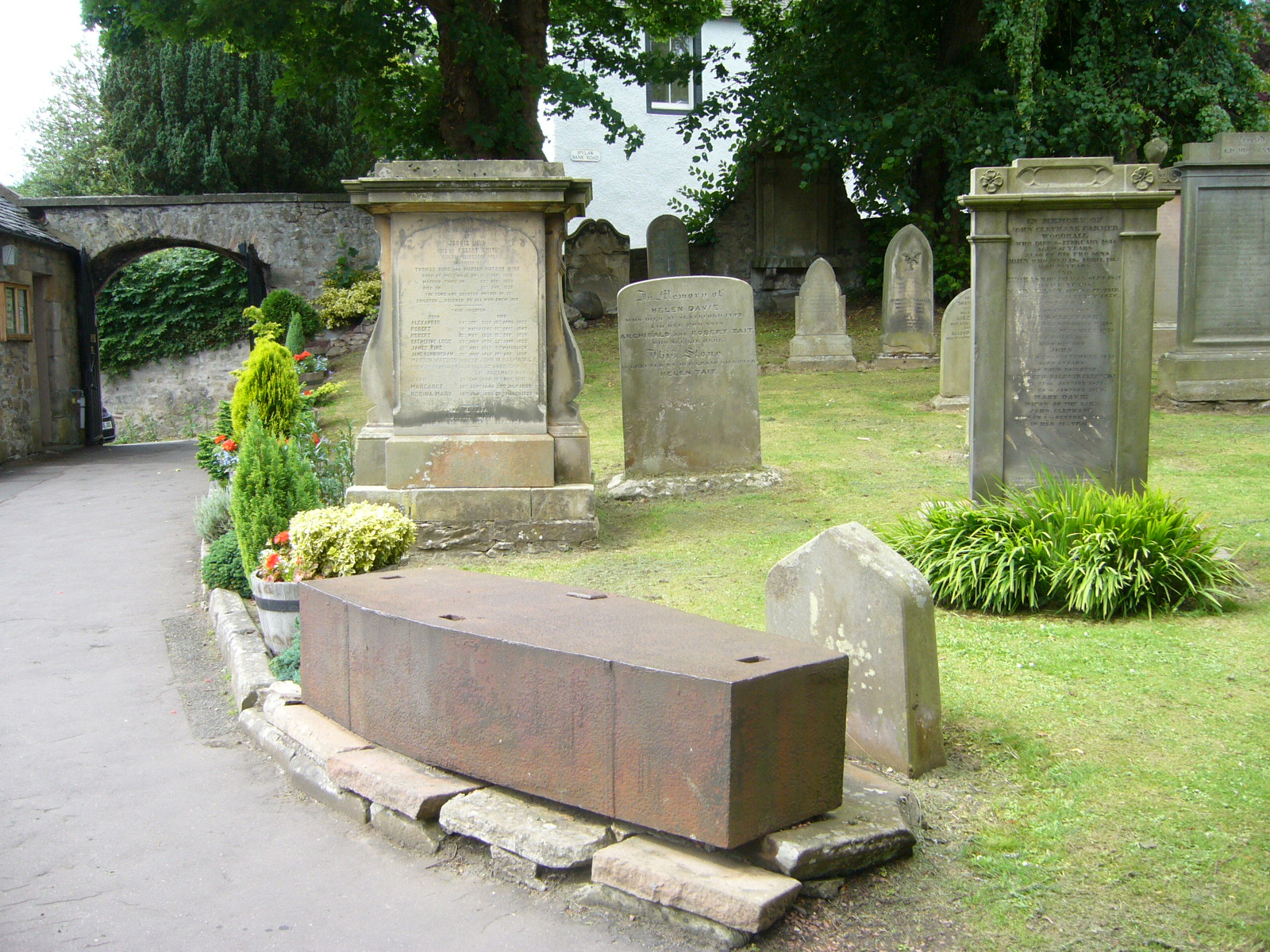
An iron coffin mortsafe in Colinton, once a village outside Edinburgh

Likely all communities near the Scottish schools of medicine in Edinburgh, Glasgow and Aberdeen employed some means of protecting the dead. Some used both mortsafes and watching, some of the watchtowers remaining to this day.

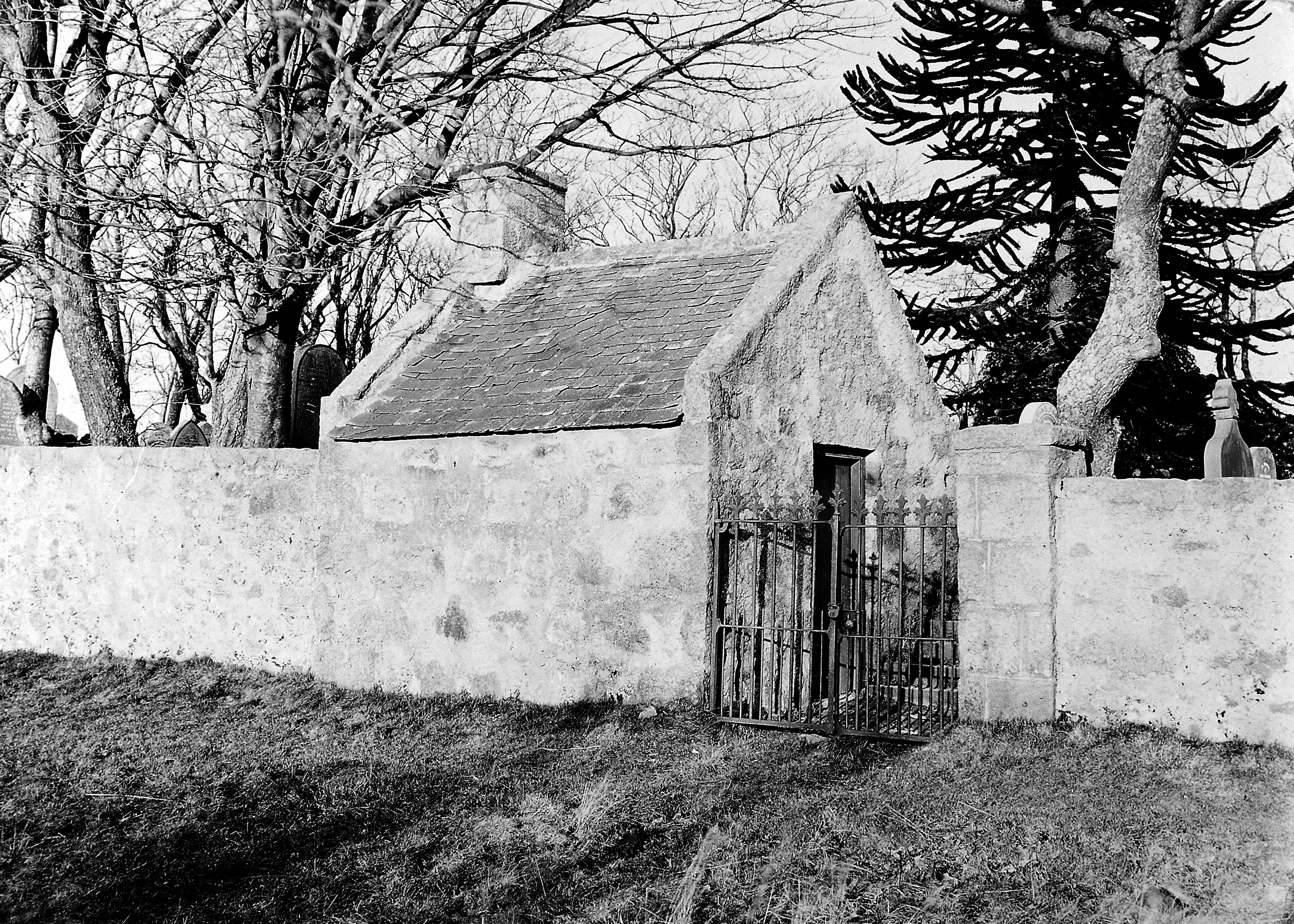
Newille Churchyard's watch house

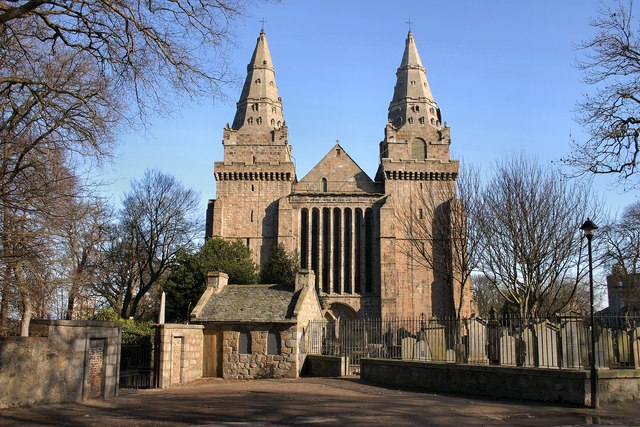
St Machar's Cathedral with the watch house

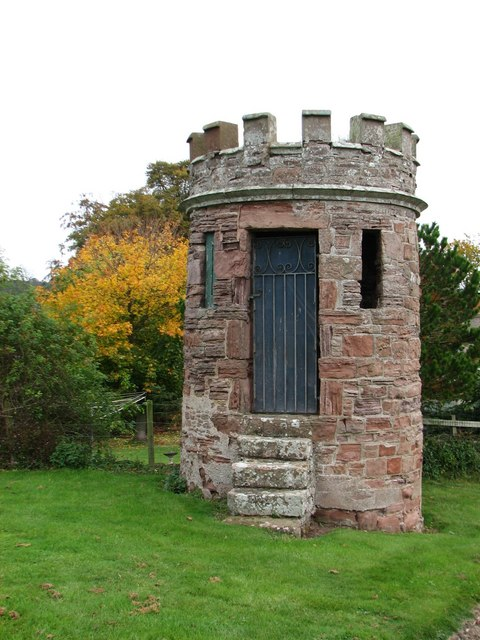
The 'Ghoul' Tower of Eckford

Surviving mortsafes are generally found in churchyards and burial grounds. Some are very broken and rusting away, such as the one in St Maurs Glencairn, while others are in reasonable conditions, for example near the old Aberfoyle church in Stirling, in the kirkyard at the remote hamlet of Towie, at the Cluny Kirkyard, at the Kirk O’Muir Cemetery, at the Logierait Churchyard, at Oyne, at the Banchory-Devenick Graveyard, in the Cadder Parish Church, and at the Greyfriars Kirkyard. Tullibody has a famous stone coffin, and had an iron coffin case to thwart local body-snatchers.

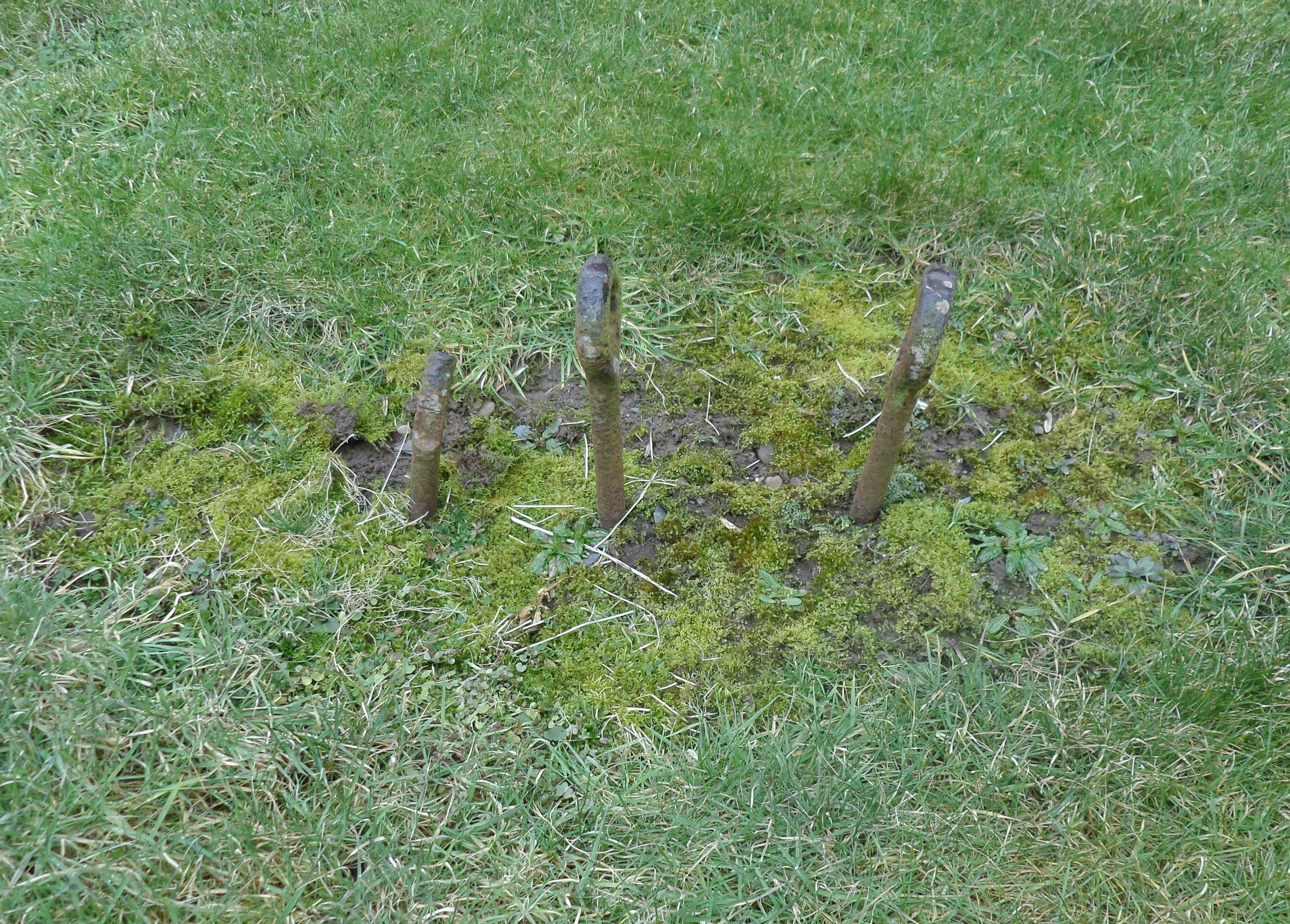
St Maurs Glencairn, Kilmaurs, East Ayrshire, Scotland - anchors for a mortsafe

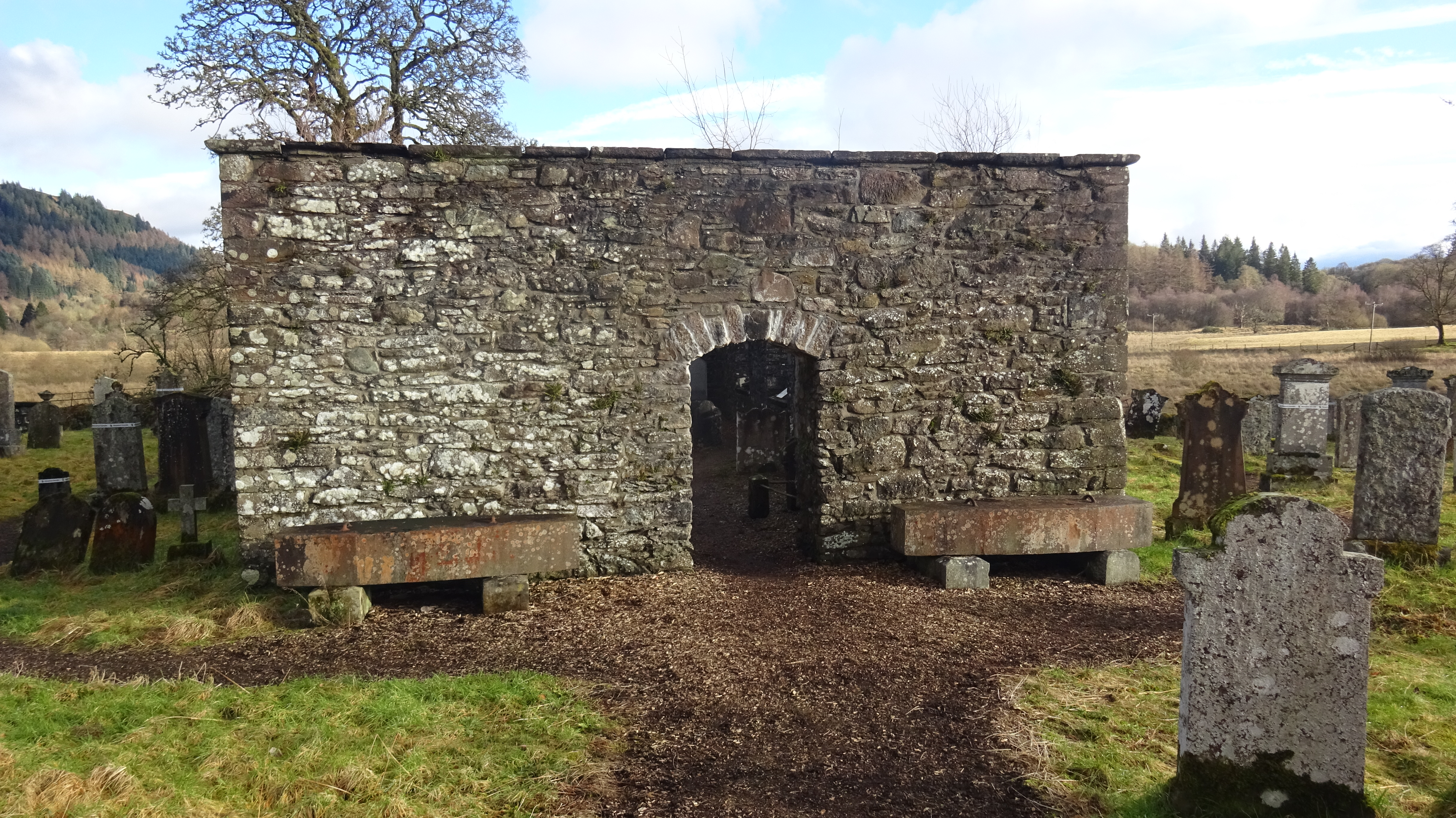
Old Aberfoyle Kirk, mortsafes and the entrance, Stirlingshire, outside the front door of the Skene Parish Church

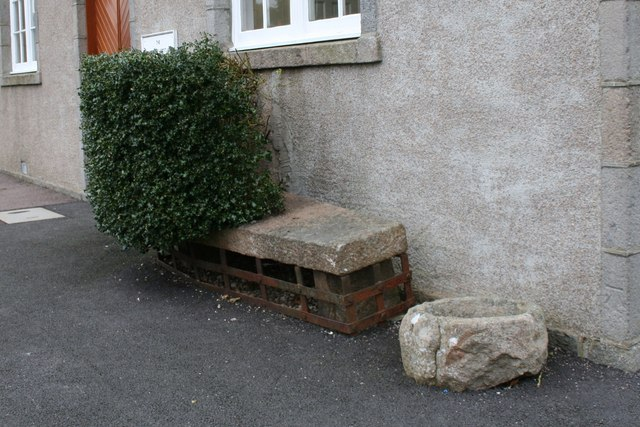
Skene Mortsafe

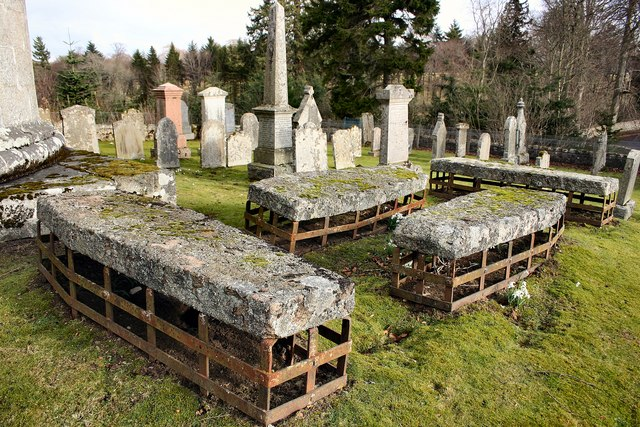
Mortsafes in Cluny kirkyard

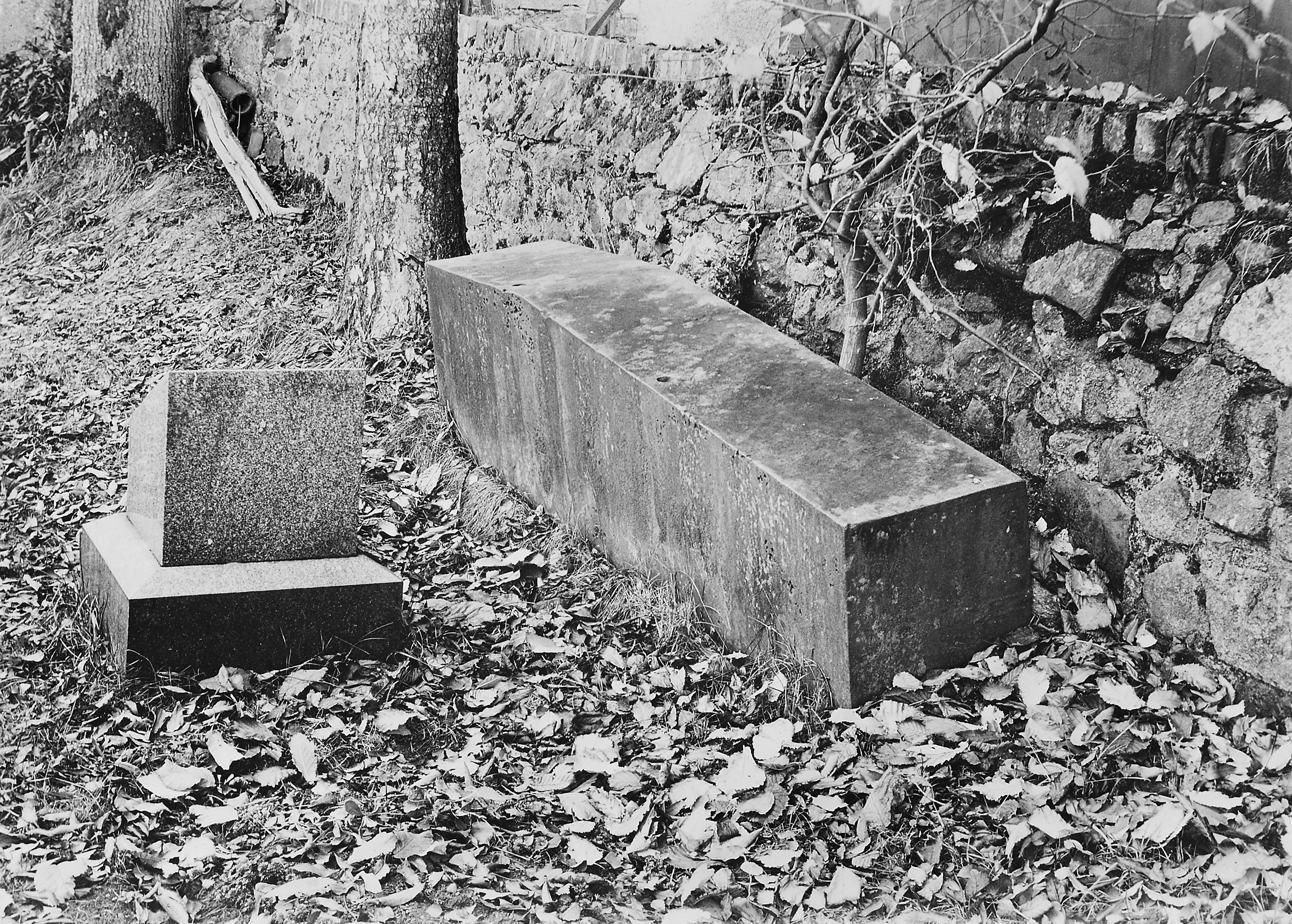
Mortsafe in Banchory Devenick graveyard, Aberdeenshire

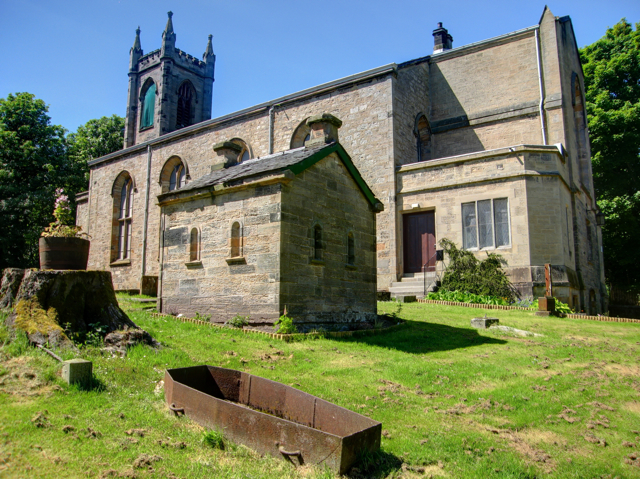
A watchhouse and iron mortsafe in Cadder Parish Church near Glasgow

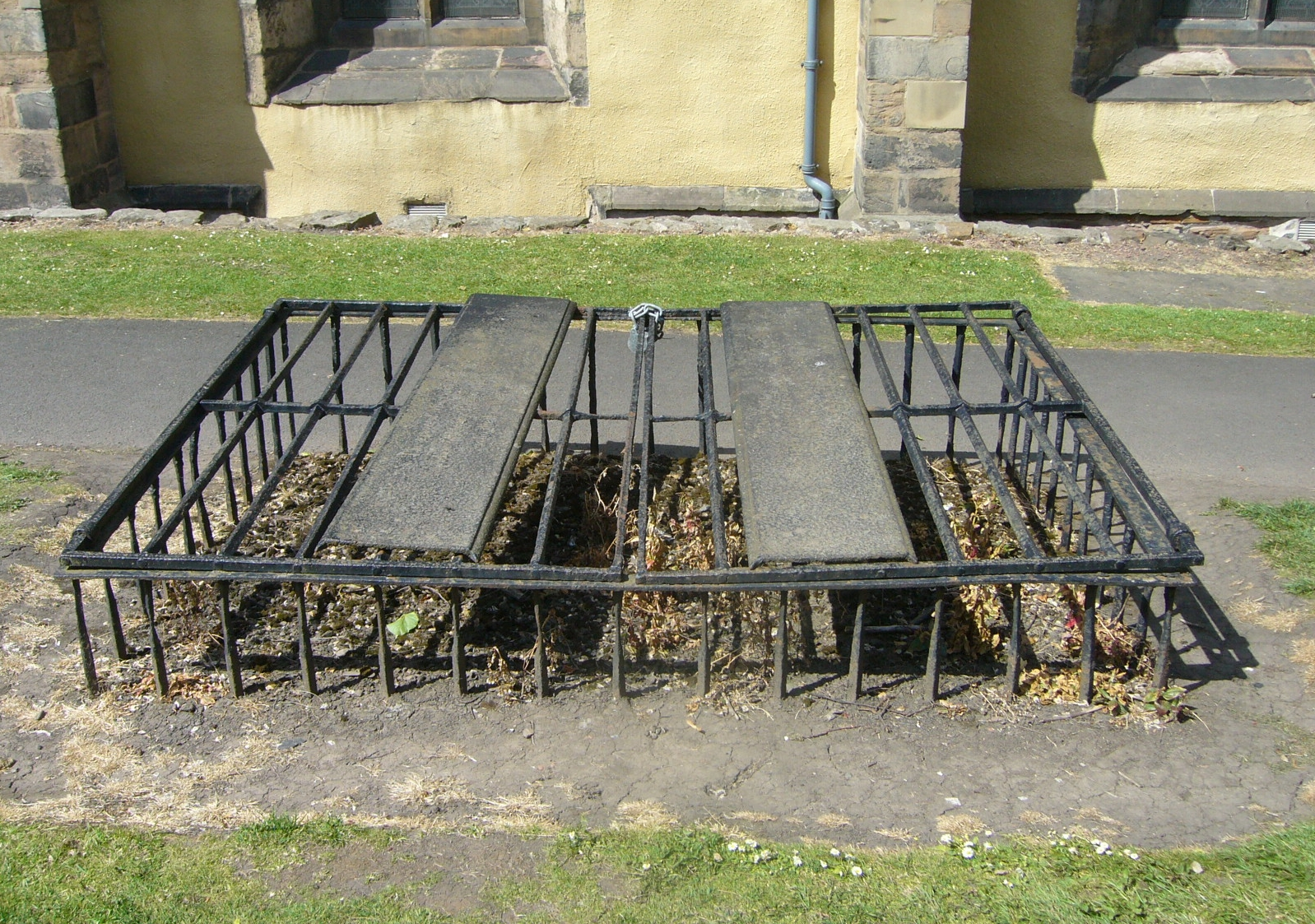
A mortsafe in Greyfriars Kirkyard, Edinburgh
