= Dark lantern =

A dark lantern is a candle lantern with a sliding shutter so that it may conveniently be made dark without extinguishing the candle (archaically, dark lanthorn).

The term may also mean:

- The Dark Lantern, a 1653 poem by George Wither
- A Dark Lantern, a 1905 novel by Elizabeth Robins
- A Dark Lantern, a 1920 film based on the 1905 novel, directed by John S. Robertson
- The Dark Lantern, a 1951 autobiographical novel by Henry Williamson
- Kilowog, a 1986 DC Comics character known in one version as Dark Lantern
- The Beast's Dark Lantern, an object from the animated miniseries Over the Garden Wall
