= Dead house =

Structure for the storage of a corpse before burial or transportation

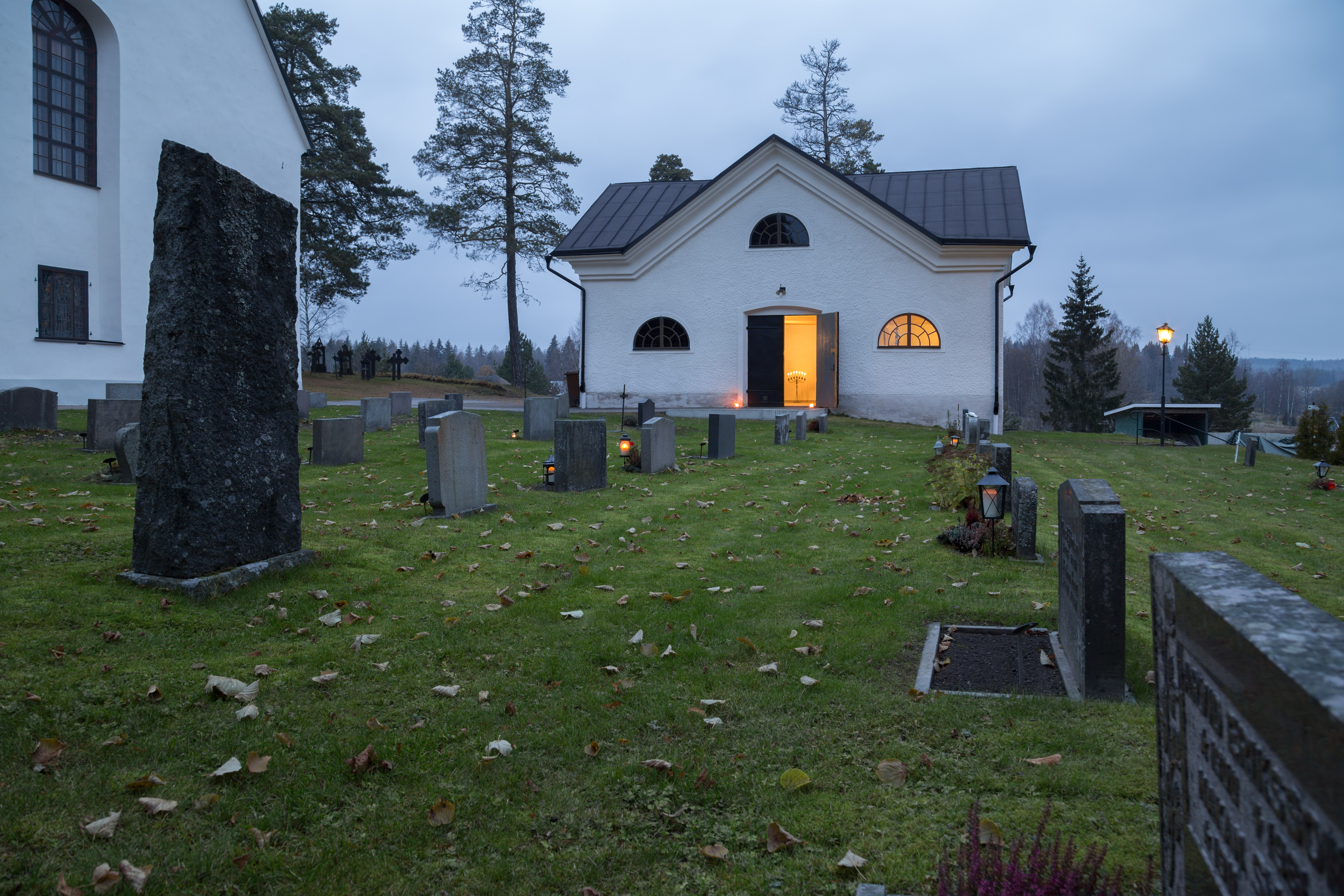
The dead house next to Garpenberg church (Church of Sweden)

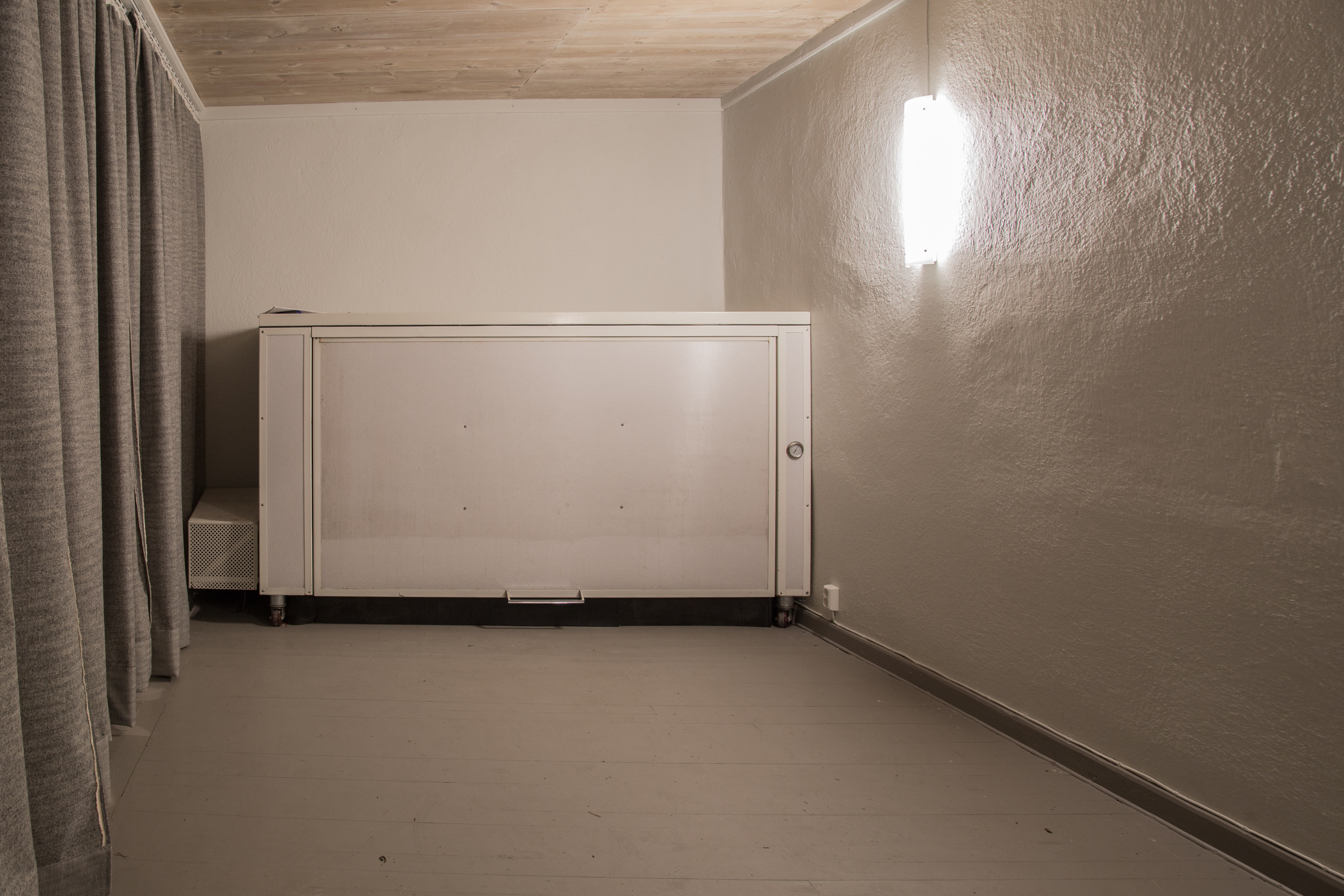
Mortuary refrigerator in the dead house next to Garpenberg church.

A dead house, deadhouse or mort house, is a structure used for the temporary storage of a human corpse before burial or transportation, usually located within or near a cemetery. Such edifices were more common before the mid-20th century in areas with cold winter climates, before which time grave excavation during the winter was either difficult or impossible.

Dead houses were common to some religious groups, such as the Moravian Church (Unitas Fratrum). The "Corpse House" still exists in the Moravian Settlement of Lititz, Pennsylvania; those in Nazareth, Bethlehem and Winston-Salem, North Carolina no longer exist. Other corpse houses exist in Moravian Congregations in Europe, in Herrnhut, Koenigsfeld, Neuwied, Zeist, Kleinwelka and Niesky. These Corpse Houses remain in use for the keeping of members' bodies until the time for burial. Like the seating in the sanctuary and the burial fields in the God's Acre, they are segregated by gender, i.e. "Brethren's Side" and "Sisters' Side". Religious and medical concerns about accurate diagnosis of death were also reasons that all burials were delayed for at least three days for Moravians, not solely cold conditions.

== The octagonal deadhouses of Ontario ==
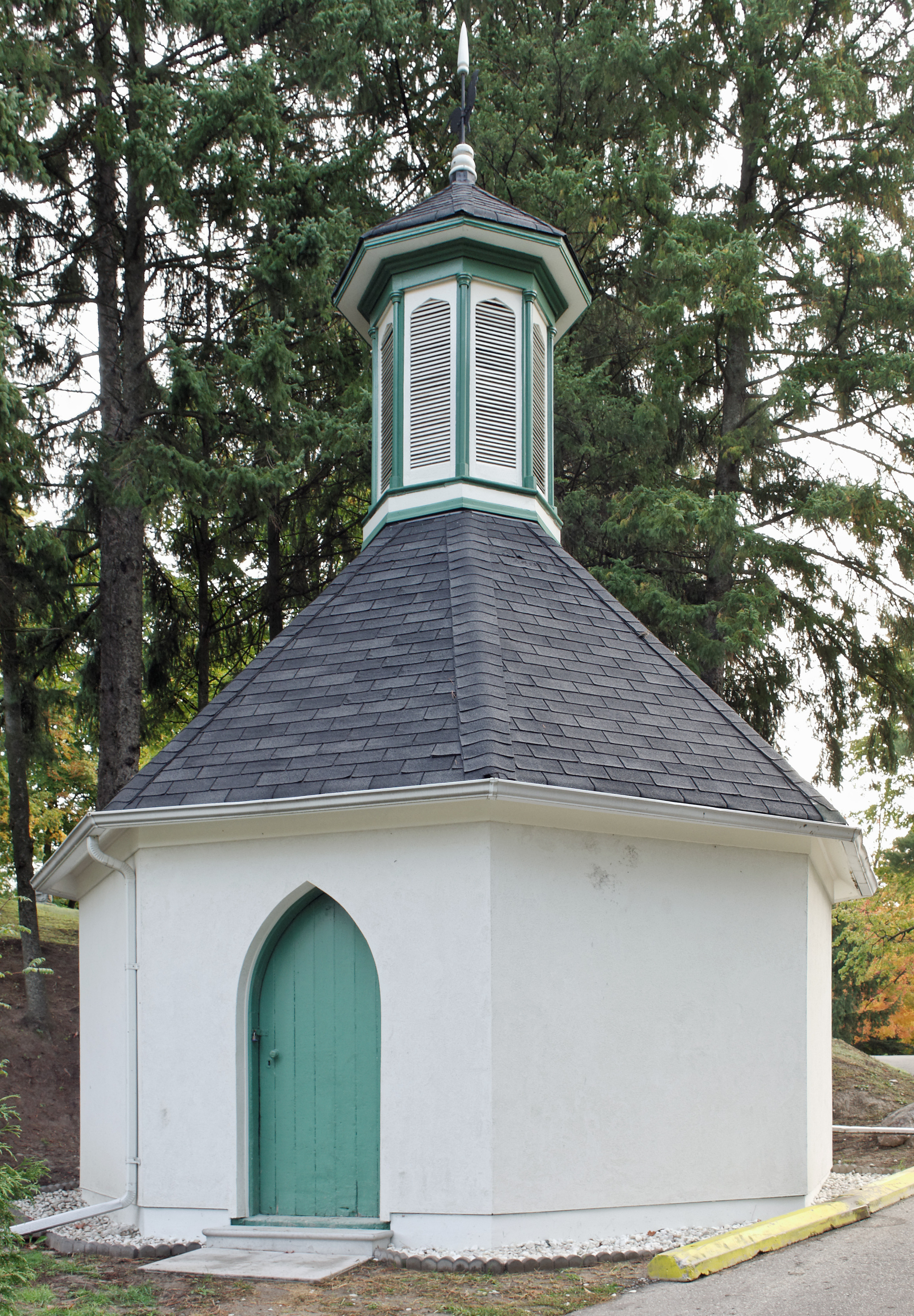
The octagonal deadhouse in Aurora, Ontario in Canada

Unique to south-central Ontario, Canada were octagonal deadhouses built in the mid-to-late-19th century. The design of these structures is thought to be inspired by a fad in the United States, promoted by Orson Squire Fowler, of erecting octagonal buildings in the early 19th century. These deadhouses were built in areas bordering Yonge Street north of Toronto, primarily in York County (now the Regional Municipality of York). At least three are classified as heritage sites, in Aurora, King, and Richmond Hill.

== See also ==
- Mortuary
- Udny Mort House
- Receiving vault, typically subterranean, with a similar function
