= Clatt =

Village in Aberdeenshire, Scotland

Coordinates: 57.322°N 2.767°W

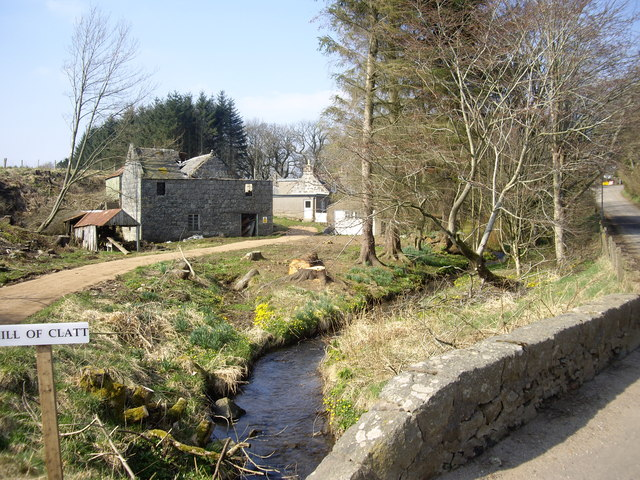

Clatt (Gaelic cleithe, 'concealed'), is a village in Aberdeenshire, Scotland. The remains of a morthouse are located in the cemetery of the old church. The village is more fully known as Kirktown of Clatt.

It is situated on the Gadie Burn at the foot of the Coreen Hills, 2 miles (3 km) east of Rhynie.

Its schools are Clatt Primary School and The Gordon Schools, Huntly.

== Clatt Parish Church ==
Within Clatt stands the former Clatt Parish Church. It was built 1799 incorporating many mediaeval fragments from a previous church and a belfry of 1640; it was repaired in 1828 and 1866. It was declared redundant in 1996 and subsequently closed as a place of worship. Following subsequent mergers in the 2020s, the area now finds itself in the larger West Gordon Parish Church parish.

== Clatt Primary School ==
Clatt Primary School was a primary school in the village of Clatt, Aberdeenshire, Scotland, built in the 19th century. It replaced an older parish school founded in the late 17th century. It was around 10 miles from Huntly. It was a small school with one teacher. It was a feeder school for The Gordon Schools, Huntly. Due to a decline in the school attendance, it was mothballed in July 2022. In early 2025, Aberdeenshire Council planned to completely close the school, expanding the catchment area of Rhynie Primary School to include the community of Clatt. Its closure was decided by Aberdeenshire council in April 2025, and was confirmed in June 2025 after Scottish Ministers declined to intervene. It went up for sale in February 2026 for £80,000 after being vacant for four years.

== Notable people ==
Robert Henderson - Physician who developed the first British iron lung
