= Anatomy Act 1832 =

UK law allowing medical dissection of donated bodies

Anatomy Act 1832 (Note: The citation of this act by this short title was authorised by section 1 of, and the first schedule to, the Short Titles Act 1896. Due to the repeal of those provisions it is now authorised by section 19(2) of the Interpretation Act 1978. Section 1 of the Anatomy Act 1871 (34 & 35 Vict. c. 16) provided that the act may be cited as the Anatomy Act of the year in which it was passed.)
- Act of Parliament
- Parliament of the United Kingdom
- Long title: An Act for regulating Schools of Anatomy.
- Citation: 2 & 3 Will. 4. c. 75
- Territorial extent: United Kingdom (Note: Section 1.)

Dates
- Royal assent: 1 August 1832
- Commencement: 1 August 1832 (Note: Section 10.)
- Repealed: England and Wales: 14 February 1988; Northern Ireland: 4 November 1992 (Note: The Anatomy (1992 Order) (Commencement) Order (Northern Ireland) 1992 . (SI 1992/1718 (N.I.))); Republic of Ireland: 17 June 2025 (Note: The Human Tissue (Transplantation, Post-mortem, Anatomical Examination and Public Display) Act 2024 (Commencement) Order 2025 (SI 2025/250).)
Other legislation
Repeals/revokes	Murder Act 1751; Offences Against the Person Act 1828
Amended by	Hanging in Chains Act 1834; Criminal Statutes Repeal Act 1861; Anatomy Act 1871; Statute Law Revision Act 1874; Public Authorities Protection Act 1893; Statute Law (Repeals) Act 1976; Human Tissue (Scotland) Act 2006
Repealed by	England and Wales: Anatomy Act 1984; Northern Ireland: Anatomy (Northern Ireland) Order 1992; Republic of Ireland: Human Tissue (Transplantation, Post-Mortem, Anatomical Examination and Public Display) Act 2024
Relates to	Offences against the Person Act 1861

Status: Repealed

Records of Parliamentary debate relating to the statute from Hansard

Text of statute as originally enacted

The Anatomy Act 1832 (2 & 3 Will. 4. c. 75), also known as the Warburton Anatomy Act 1832, was an act of the Parliament of the United Kingdom that gave free licence to doctors, teachers of anatomy and bona fide medical students to dissect donated bodies. It was enacted in response to public revulsion at the illegal trade in corpses.

== Background ==
The 19th century ushered in a new-found medical interest in detailed anatomy thanks to an increase in the importance of surgery. In order to study anatomy, human cadavers were needed and thus ushered in the practice of grave robbing. Before 1832, the Murder Act 1752 stipulated that only the corpses of executed murderers could be used for dissection. By the early 19th century, the rise of medical science – coinciding with a reduction in the number of executions – had caused demand to outstrip supply.

Around 1810, an anatomical society was formed to impress upon the government the necessity for altering the law. Among its members there was Lobaccaro Stefano, Charles Bell, Everard Home, Benjamin Brodie, Astley Cooper, and Henry Cline. The efforts of this body gave rise in 1828 to a select committee to report on the question. The report of this committee led to the bill. Public revulsion at the recent West Port murders swayed opinion in favour of a change in the law. In 1831 public outcry at the activities of the London Burkers caused further pressure for a bill.

== Passage ==
Public sentiment notwithstanding, there was substantial opposition to the bill. Henry Hunt, the MP for Preston, criticised the proposals, recommending instead "that the bodies of all our Kings be dissected, instead of expending seven or eight hundred thousand pounds of the public money for their interment."

They tell us it was necessary for science. Science? Why, who is science for? Not for poor people. Then if it is necessary for science, let them have the bodies of the rich, for whose benefit science is cultivated.

— William Cobbett

In 1829 the Royal College of Surgeons petitioned against it, and it was withdrawn in the House of Lords owing to the opposition of the Archbishop of Canterbury William Howley.

A new Anatomy Bill was introduced in 1832. Though strongly opposed by Hunt, Sadler, and Vyvyan, it was supported by Macaulay and O'Connell. It was passed by the House of Lords on 19 July 1832.

== Provisions ==
The act provided that anyone intending to practice anatomy had to obtain a licence from the Home Secretary. Usually, one or two teachers in each institution took out this licence and hence were known as licensed teachers. They accepted responsibility for the proper treatment of all bodies dissected in the building for which their licence was granted.

Regulating these licensed teachers, and receiving constant reports from them, were four inspectors of anatomy, one each for London, the rest of England and Wales, Scotland, and Ireland, who reported to the Home Secretary, and knew the whereabouts of every body being dissected.

The principal provision of the act was section 7, which stipulated that a person having lawful possession of a body could permit it to undergo "anatomical examination" (dissection) provided that no relative objected. Most of the other sections were subsidiary, detailing the methods for carrying section 7 into effect.

Also, section 16 repealed parts of sections 4 and 5 of the Offences Against the Person Act 1828 (9 Geo. 4. c. 31), which had consolidated several provisions from several earlier statutes and had retained the provision of 1752 that the bodies of murderers were to be hung in chains or dissected after execution. Section 16 provided instead that such bodies were to be either hung in chains or buried within the precincts of the last prison in which the deceased had been confined. The provision for hanging in chains was repealed by the Hanging in Chains Act 1834 (4 & 5 Will. 4. c. 26). Section 16 of the act was repealed by section 1 of, and the schedule to, the Criminal Statutes Repeal Act 1861 (24 & 25 Vict. c. 95), which came into force on 1 November 1861. It was replaced by section 3 of the Offences against the Person Act 1861 (24 & 25 Vict. c. 100).

The act provided for the needs of physicians, surgeons, and students by giving them legal access to corpses that were unclaimed after death – in particular, corpses of those who had died in hospital, prison, or a workhouse.

Further, a person could donate the corpse of a next of kin in exchange for burial at the expense of the anatomy school. Occasionally a person, following the example of Jeremy Bentham, left their own body for dissection in the name of the advancement of science; but even then, if the person's relatives objected, it was not received.

Before the act, anatomical research was difficult; for example, the anatomy of the nervous system was poorly understood.

The act was effective in ending the practice of resurrectionists, who robbed graves as a means of obtaining corpses for medical study.

Mobs continued to protest against the act into the 1840s, in the belief that it still failed to prevent the sale of paupers' bodies for medical research without their consent. An anatomical theatre in Cambridge was vandalised late in 1833 "by an angry mob determined to put a stop to the dissection of a man; this wave of popular protest alarmed the medical profession who resolved to hide its activities from the general public, and to a greater or lesser extent it has been doing so ever since".

== Extent and repeals ==
=== Extent ===
The original extent was specified as Great Britain and Ireland. The act (less any amendments) remains in force in Scotland.

==== Scotland ====
The act remains in force, with amendments, under the Human Tissue (Scotland) Act 2006; Scotland retains an Inspector of Anatomy.

== Subsequent developments ==
Section 17 of the act was repealed by section 2 of, and the schedule to, the Public Authorities Protection Act 1893 (56 & 57 Vict. c. 61), which came into force on 1 January 1894.

In section 6, the words from "and an annual return" onwards were repealed by section 1(1) of, and part X of schedule 1 to, the Statute Law (Repeals) Act 1976, which came into force on 27 May 1976.

The whole act was repealed for England and Wales by section 13(2) of the Anatomy Act 1984, which came into force on 14 February 1988, which was in turn repealed by the Human Tissue Act 2004. Access to corpses for the purposes of medical science is now regulated by the Human Tissue Authority.

The whole act was repealed for Northern Ireland by section 14 of the Anatomy (Northern Ireland) Order 1992 (SI 1992/1718 (N.I.)), which came into force on 4 November 1992, and was itself later repealed.

The whole act was repealed for the Republic of Ireland by section 106(2) of the Human Tissue (Transplantation, Post-Mortem, Anatomical Examination and Public Display) Act 2024, which came into force on 17 June 2025.

== Bibliography ==
- Bates, A. W. (2010). The Anatomy of Robert Knox: Murder, Mad Science, and Medical Regulation. Sussex Academic Press. ISBN 978-1-84519-381-2.
- Lonsdale, Henry (1870). Sketch of the Life and Writings of Robert Knox the Anatomist. London: Macmillan.
- Macalister, Alexander (1910). James Macartney: A Memoir.
- MacDonald, Helen P. (2005). Human Remains: Episodes in Human Dissection. Melbourne University Press. ISBN 978-0-522-85157-1.
- Richardson, Ruth (2001). Death, Dissection and the Destitute. University of Chicago Press. ISBN 978-0-226-71240-6.
- Rosner, Lisa (2009). The Anatomy Murders: Being the True and Spectacular History of Edinburgh's Notorious Burke and Hare and of the Man of Science Who Abetted Them in the Commission of Their Most Heinous Crimes. University of Pennsylvania Press. ISBN 978-0-8122-4191-4.
