= The Body Snatcher (1945 film) =

1945 horror film directed by Robert Wise

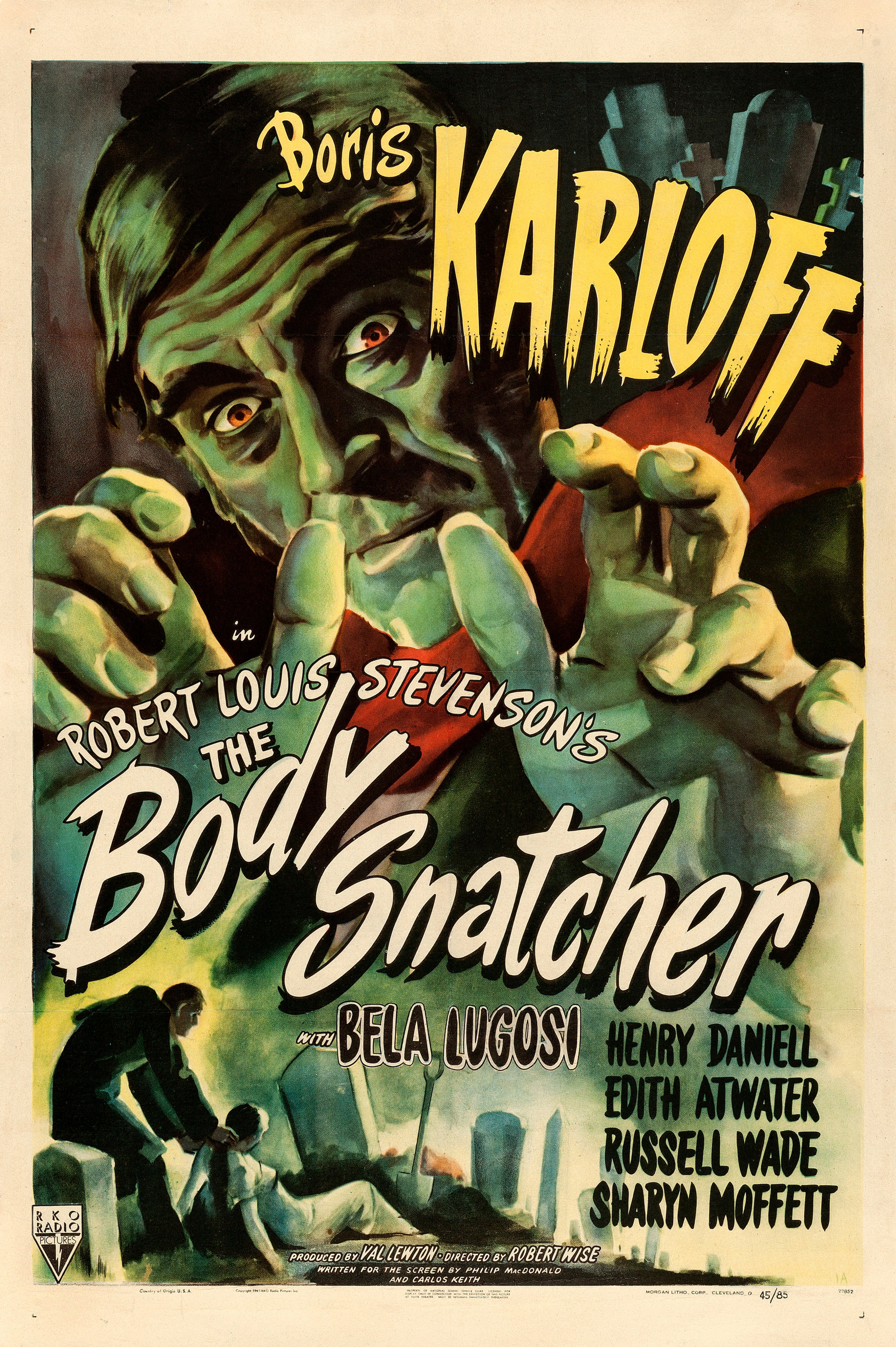
- Theatrical release poster by William Rose
- Directed by: Robert Wise
- Screenplay by: Philip MacDonald; Val Lewton (credited as Carlos Keith)
- Based on: "The Body Snatcher"; 1884 short story by Robert Louis Stevenson
- Produced by: Val Lewton
- Starring: Boris Karloff; Bela Lugosi; Henry Daniell; Edith Atwater; Russell Wade
- Cinematography: Robert De Grasse
- Edited by: J.R. Whittredge
- Music by: Roy Webb
- Production company: RKO Radio Pictures
- Distributed by: RKO Radio Pictures
- Release date: May 25, 1945
- Running time: 78 minutes
- Country: United States
- Language: English

The Body Snatcher is a 1945 American horror film directed by Robert Wise, based on the 1884 short story of the same name by Robert Louis Stevenson. Philip MacDonald adapted the story for the screen, and producer Val Lewton, credited as "Carlos Keith", modified MacDonald's screenplay. The film stars Boris Karloff as John Gray, a cab driver who moonlights as a grave robber, and later murderer, to illegally supply Dr. MacFarlane (played by Henry Daniell) with cadavers for his classes, and makes mention of Burke, Hare, and Dr. Knox, in reference to the West Port murders of 1828. Alongside Karloff and Daniell, the film's cast includes Russell Wade, Edith Atwater, and Bela Lugosi. It was the last film in which both Karloff and Lugosi appeared together.

== Plot ==
In Edinburgh in 1831, Mrs. Marsh brings her paraplegic daughter, Georgina, to see Dr. Wolfe MacFarlane at his home, where he has an office and an anatomy school. MacFarlane discovers a tumor pressing on Georgina's spinal cord, but insists he cannot perform the delicate operation to remove it because he is too busy teaching. After the Marshes leave, Donald Fettes tells MacFarlane that he cannot afford to continue his studies, so the doctor hires Fettes as his assistant.

Fettes moves into MacFarlane's house. He is awakened one night when John Gray, a cab driver and body snatcher, delivers a corpse for MacFarlane's students to dissect. Although he says he would rather quit medicine than be involved with such ghoulish business, MacFarlane convinces Fettes of the importance of the work and that due to restrictions upon which corpses can legally be used for dissection, medical schools must work with men like Gray.

At a pub, Gray, who calls MacFarlane "Toddy", gets MacFarlane to begrudgingly buy him a drink, telling Fettes he is an old friend. Fettes asks MacFarlane to reconsider operating on Georgina, and Gray seems to convince MacFarlane by making a threatening reference to "some private reasons" between them. When MacFarlane later tells Fettes that he does not really intend to help Georgina, as he does not have a cadaver to study, Fettes goes to Gray and asks him to procure another corpse. As guards have been posted at the cemeteries because he killed a dog during the last bodysnatching, instead of digging someone up, Gray murders a young street singer.

Recognizing the singer, whom he had seen alive after he left Gray, Fettes tells MacFarlane that Gray must have killed her. He wants to contact the police, but MacFarlane cautions him that if a crime were committed, he would be an accomplice, and Fettes helps get the body ready for the students. The conversation is overheard by Joseph, the janitor at MacFarlane's school.

MacFarlane performs Georgina's operation, and she recovers well, but still cannot walk. Frustrated, MacFarlane gets drunk at the pub, where Gray torments him by saying his studies with Dr. Knox taught him about dead bodies, not how to heal people. When Gray reminds MacFarlane that he helped keep the doctor from becoming involved in the trial of Burke and Hare, MacFarlane tells Gray that he is no longer afraid and demands Gray leave him alone.

Joseph visits Gray to blackmail him about the murder of the street singer, and Gray acts agreeable, before smothering Joseph to death. Gray delivers the body to MacFarlane as a "gift", and when MacFarlane finds it, he tells Fettes to prepare Joseph for dissection and goes to deal with Gray. Fettes feels trapped, but Meg Cameron, MacFarlane's housekeeper and secret wife, tells Fettes about MacFarlane's past and convinces him to leave.

MacFarlane tries to bribe Gray to stop tormenting him, but Gray rejects the offer, saying he enjoys having a great man under his thumb. Enraged, MacFarlane beats Gray to death. He tells Meg that he is finally rid of Gray, but she has doubts.

The next day, Fettes sees Georgina stand up. He rushes to tell MacFarlane, but Meg says the doctor is in Penicuik, where he went to sell Gray's horse and cab after using his body for dissection. Fettes takes MacFarlane's carriage and gives MacFarlane the news in a tavern. A group of mourners enters, and MacFarlane, his spirits high, decides to dig up their relative's body so he can teach his students to perform "miracles".

Fettes and MacFarlane seat the unearthed corpse, wrapped in a tarp, between them in MacFarlane's carriage. As they drive through the dark and the heavy rain, MacFarlane begins to hear Gray taunting him. He stops and orders Fettes to get down and shine a lamp on the body, and when he uncovers the head, he sees Gray's face. The horse bolts, leaving Fettes behind, and MacFarlane struggles with Gray's corpse, which seems to be trying to grasp him. After separating from the horse, the carriage tumbles down a steep hill. When Fettes reaches the wreck, he finds MacFarlane's dead body next to the corpse of the woman MacFarlane and he had dug up.

== Cast ==
- Boris Karloff as Cabman John Gray
- Béla Lugosi as Joseph
- Henry Daniell as Dr. Wolfe "Toddy" MacFarlane
- Edith Atwater as Meg Camden
- Russell Wade as Donald Fettes
- Rita Corday as Mrs. Marsh
- Sharyn Moffett as Georgina Marsh
- Donna Lee as the Street Singer

== Production ==
=== Development ===
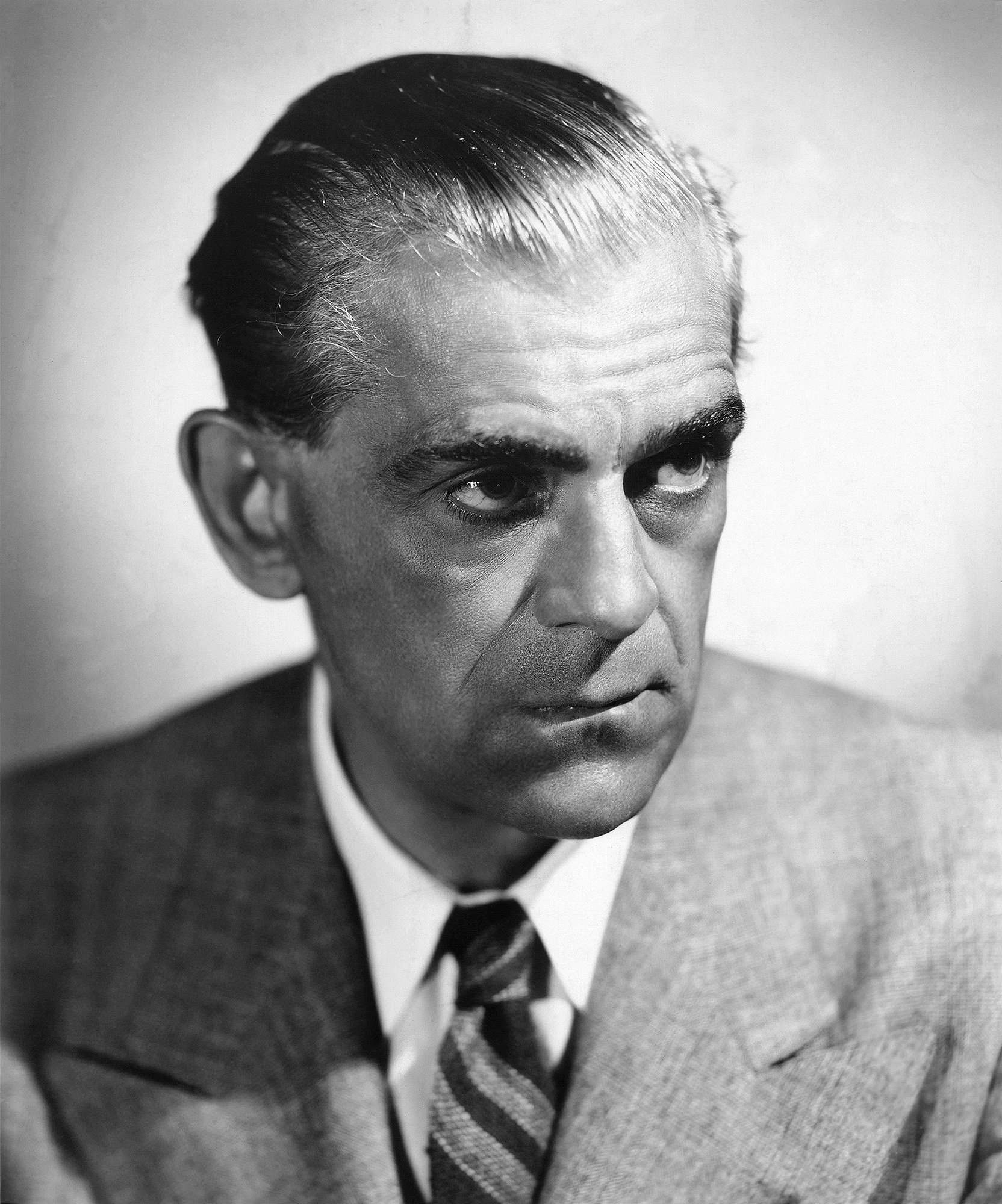
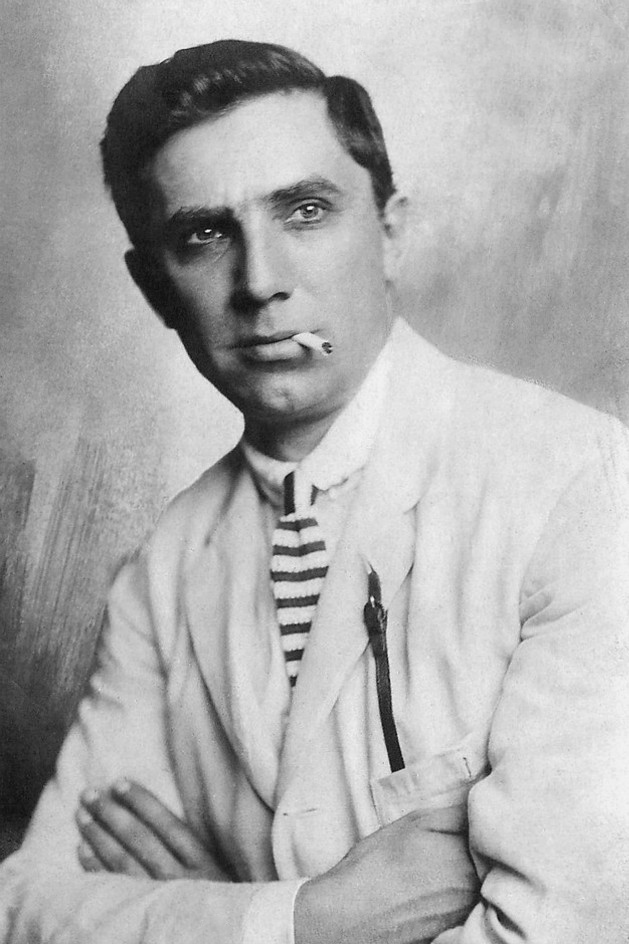
The Body Snatcher was the final film to feature both Boris Karloff (left, pictured c. 1940s) and Bela Lugosi (right, c. 1912)

The Body Snatcher was one of three films that Boris Karloff made with producer Val Lewton at RKO Radio Pictures from 1945 to 1946, the other two being Isle of the Dead (1945) and Bedlam (1946). In a 1946 interview with Louis Berg of the Los Angeles Times, Karloff discussed his reasons for leaving Universal Pictures and working with Lewton. He said that while his appearance in Universal's Frankenstein in 1931 had made him a star, he felt the franchise had run its course, calling the most recent installment, House of Frankenstein (1944), a "monster clambake", as it featured Frankenstein's monster, Count Dracula, the Wolf Man, and a hunchback. Though the film performed well at the box office, Karloff found it ridiculous and decided not to renew his contract, crediting Lewton as "the man who rescued him from the living dead and restored, so to speak, his soul".

Lewton had British screenwriter Philip MacDonald adapt Robert Louis Stevenson's 1884 short story "The Body Snatcher" for the screen, enlarging the role to be played by Karloff. Lewton also worked on the screenplay, writing under the pen name of "Carlos Keith". When the casting of Bela Lugosi was suggested to possibly add marquee value to the film, he signed a deal with RKO, and Lewton and MacDonald wrote the small role of Joseph for him. The Body Snatcher was the last film to feature both Karloff and Lugosi.

Robert Wise, a longtime film editor at RKO, was assigned to direct the film. He had previously worked with Lewton as the replacement director of The Curse of the Cat People (1944), which had fallen behind schedule, and the director of Mademoiselle Fifi (1944).

=== Filming ===
Principal photography for the film took place between October 25 and November 17, 1944. During filming, tension arose between Lewton and executive producer Jack J. Gross, who sent Lewton into production with what Lewton felt was a small budget.

== Release ==
=== Theatrical release ===
The film premiered at the Missouri Theater in St. Louis, Missouri, on the night of February 14, 1945. The premiere event included a horse-drawn hearse outside the theater loaded with dummy cadavers, and as it was Valentine's Day, RKO distributed Valentine's cards featuring Karloff and Lugosi with the phrase: "Please Give Me a Piece of Your Heart". After the screening, a live spook show hosted by stage magician Dr. Neff was presented.

On May 10, 1945, the film opened at the Hawaii Theatre in Hollywood. A grave-robbing display was placed in the lobby, and the film was preceded by a live prologue on stage by actor Eric Jason, who sought a live patron to place into a coffin. The screening of The Body Snatcher was followed by the screening of another RKO-produced film, The Brighton Strangler (1945).

The film opened at the Rialto on Broadway in New York City on May 25, 1945.

=== Censorship ===
On May 14, 1945, RKO executive Sid Kramer informed RKO that the film had been "condemned in its entirety by the city of Chicago and the state of Ohio, but with certain eliminations to be made, an adult permit at least will be forthcoming for Chicago. As for Ohio, a cut version of the picture has to be submitted for further consideration." The film required cuts not only in Ohio, but also New York, Kansas, and Pennsylvania. In England, censors removed the sequence featuring Gray's apparition towards the end of the film. Additionally, the film was initially banned in British Columbia, but it was passed after an appeal.

The Catholic National Legion of Decency gave the film a "B" rating, deeming it "morally objectionable in part" due to "excessive gruesomeness". About this rating, Kramer stated: "I feel there is too much unanimity of opinion on the part of the people in the Legion about this picture to secure any better classification than the present one."

== Reception ==
=== Box office ===
The Body Snatcher was a commercial success, grossing $317,000 domestically and $230,000 internationally, for a total of $547,000 and a profit of $118,000.

=== Critical response ===
Upon its release, John McManus of the New York PM Reviews commended Karloff's performance and wrote that "The Body Snatcher inherits class from its Robert Louis Stevenson parentage; it has the distinction, like many an ancient and honorable British ballad, of being a shocker with an edifying background of fact; [...] The Body Snatcher, if you are one for well-told legends, for balladry or just for shockers by preference, is something you won't want to miss." A reviewer writing for the New York Herald Tribune wrote that Karloff "proves that with capable direction and script to work with he can be a real menace instead of a mere monster." A reviewer for The New York Times wrote that the film captivated the audience at its Rialto premiere "with nary a werewolf or vampire! But then, with Karloff on the prowl, what chance would a bloodthirsty hobgoblin stand?"

Actor Russell Wade, recalling the premiere screening at Hollywood's Hawaii Theatre, stated: "It was a real 'audience picture'. Some of those scenes [...] such as the sudden snort of the horse, and Karloff's murder of the street singer – got tremendous audience reaction." A reporter for The Hollywood Citizen News wrote of the audience reaction to the moments of dark humor in the film, noting a scene in which MacFarlane tells Gray, "You know something about the human body" (to which Gray replies, "I've had some experience!") as having "brought down the house!"

On the review aggregator website Rotten Tomatoes, the film holds an approval rating of 86% based on 21 reviews, with an average score of 7/10.

In 2018, J. Hoberman of The New York Times referred to Karloff's role in the film as "a sensationally creepy performance – at once vicious and obsequious".

== Home media ==
The film was first released on Region 1 DVD by Warner Home Video in 2005 as part of "The Val Lewton Horror Collection", a 9-film box set, on the same disc as I Walked with a Zombie (1943). A Blu-ray edition was released by Shout! Factory in March 2019, featuring a 4K scan of the original camera negative.

== See also ==
- Boris Karloff filmography
- Bela Lugosi filmography
