= Tales and Fantasies =

Tales and Fantasies is a short story collection by Robert Louis Stevenson. The book was published posthumously in 1905. It contains three stories, which were not published as a part of a collection during Stevenson′s lifetime:

- "The Misadventures of John Nicholson: A Christmas Story" (1885–87). First published in Yule Tide, 1887, later in the Edinburgh Edition, 1897.
- "The Body Snatcher" (1881). First published in the Christmas 1884 edition of the Pall Mall Gazette, later in the Edinburgh Edition, 1895.
- "The Story of a Lie" (1879). First published in New Quarterly Magazine in 1879; later in The Novels and Tales of Robert Louis Stevenson, vol 3, 1895.
