= Robert Knox (surgeon) =

Scottish physician, anatomist, geologist and ethnologist (1791–1862)

Robert Knox FRSE FRCSE
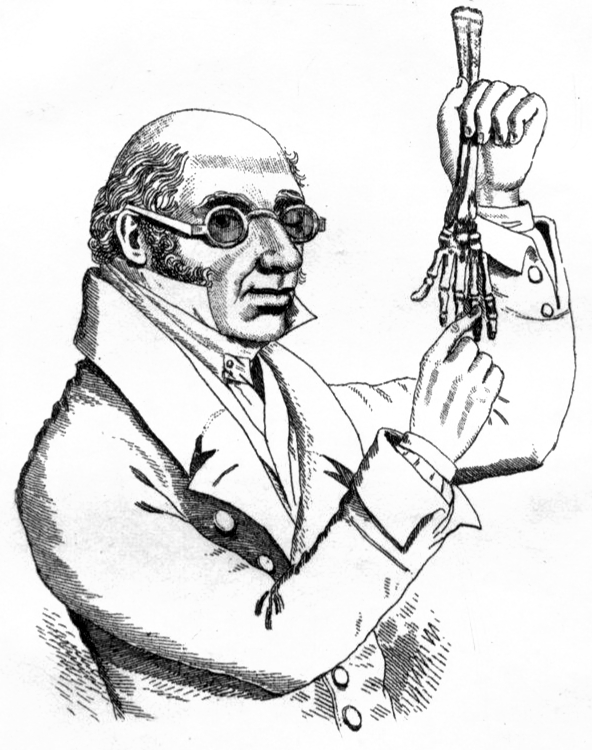
- Robert Knox, c. 1830
- Born: 4 September 1791; Edinburgh, Scotland
- Died: 20 December 1862 (aged 71); Hackney, London, England
- Education: University of Edinburgh
- Occupations: Anatomist, ethnologist
- Known for: Burke and Hare murders

Robert Knox FRSE FRCSE (4 September 1791 – 20 December 1862) was a Scottish anatomist and ethnologist best known for his involvement in the Burke and Hare murders. Born in Edinburgh, Scotland, Knox eventually partnered with anatomist and former teacher John Barclay and became a lecturer on anatomy in the city, where he introduced the theory of transcendental anatomy. However, Knox's incautious methods of obtaining cadavers for dissection before the passage of the Anatomy Act 1832 and disagreements with professional colleagues ruined his reputation in Scotland. Following these developments, he moved to London, though this did not revive his career.

Knox's views on humanity gradually shifted over the course of his lifetime, as his initially positive views (influenced by the ideals of Étienne Geoffroy Saint-Hilaire) gave way to a more pessimistic view. Knox also devoted the latter part of his career to studying and theorising on evolution and ethnology; during this period, he also wrote numerous works advocating scientific racism. His work on the latter further harmed his legacy and overshadowed his contributions to evolutionary theory, which he used to account for racial differences.

== Life ==
=== Early life ===
Robert Knox was born in 1791 in Edinburgh's North Richmond Street, the eighth child of Mary (née Scherer) and Robert Knox (d. 1812), a teacher of mathematics and natural philosophy at Heriot's Hospital in Edinburgh. As an infant, he contracted smallpox, which destroyed his left eye and disfigured his face. He was educated at the Royal High School of Edinburgh, where he was remembered as a 'bully' who thrashed his contemporaries "mentally and corporeally". He won the Lord Provost's gold medal in his final year.

In 1810, he joined medical classes at the University of Edinburgh. He soon became interested in transcendentalism and the work of Xavier Bichat. He was twice president of the Royal Physical Society, an undergraduate club to which he presented papers on hydrophobia and nosology. The final recorded event of his university years was his just failing the anatomy examination. Knox joined the "extramural" anatomy class of the famous John Barclay. Barclay was an anatomist of the highest distinction, and perhaps the greatest anatomical teacher in Britain at that time. Redoubling his efforts, Knox passed competently the second time around.

=== Life abroad ===
Knox graduated from the University of Edinburgh in 1814, with a Latin thesis on the effects of narcotics which was published the following year. He joined the army and was commissioned Hospital Assistant on 24 June 1815, after having studied for a year under John Abernethy at St Bartholomew's Hospital in London. He was sent immediately to Belgium to attend the wounded from the Battle of Waterloo and returned two weeks later with the first batch of wounded aboard a hospital ship; during the voyage he successfully employed Abernethy's technique of leaving wounds open to the air. His army work at the Brussels military hospital (near Waterloo) impressed upon him the need for a comprehensive training in anatomy if surgery were to be successful. Knox was intelligent, critical and irritable. He did not suffer fools gladly and—in an aside with terrible consequences for his future career—he was critical of the surgical work of Charles Bell with casualties at the Battle of Waterloo. After a further trip to Belgium he was placed in charge of Hilsea hospital near Portsmouth, where he experimented with non-mercurial cures for syphilis.

In April 1817, he joined the 72nd Highlanders and sailed with them to South Africa. There were few army surgeons in the Cape Colony but Knox found the people healthy and his duties were light. He enjoyed riding, shooting and the beauty of the landscape with which he felt in spiritual harmony—an early expression of his transcendental world view. Knox developed an interest in observing racial types, and disapproved of what he saw as the Boers' contempt for the indigenous peoples. However, after an abortive Xhosa rebellion against the colonial forces, he was involved in a retaliatory raid commanded by Andries Stockenström, a magistrate and future Lieutenant Governor. Relations with Stockenström were marred when Knox accused O. G. Stockenström, Andries' brother, of theft, a charge apparently prompted by ill feeling between British and Boer officers. A court martial acquitted O. G. of the charge and Andries called Knox's conduct shameful. One of Stockenström's supporters, a former naval officer named Burdett, challenged Knox to a duel. Knox initially refused to fight, and Burdett "soundly horse whipped him on the parade before every Officer of the Garrison." Knox then grabbed a sabre and inflicted a slight wound to Burdett's arm. Knox's promotion to Assistant Surgeon was cancelled and he returned to Britain in disgrace, arriving on Christmas Day 1820. He remained only until the following October, after which he went to Paris to study anatomy for just over a year (1821–22). It was then that he met both Georges Cuvier and Étienne Geoffroy Saint-Hilaire, who were to remain his heroes for the rest of life, to populate his later medical journalism, and to become the subject of his hagiography, Great artists and great anatomists. While in Paris he befriended Thomas Hodgkin, with whom he shared a dissecting room at l'Hôpital de la Pitié.

=== Career in Edinburgh ===
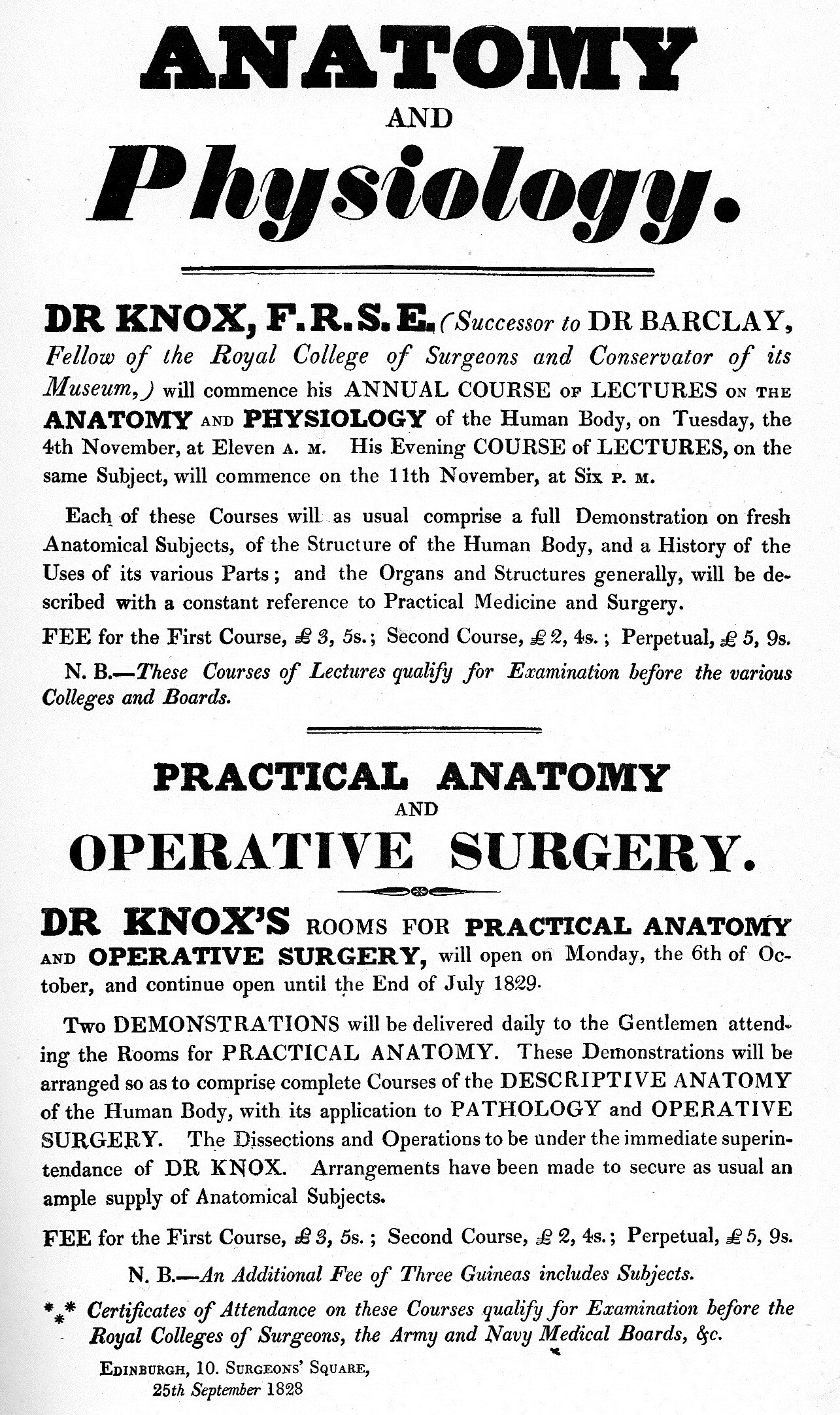
Bill advertising Knox's anatomy lectures in 1828

Knox returned to Edinburgh by Christmas 1822. On 1 December 1823 he was elected a Fellow of the Royal Society of Edinburgh. During these years he communicated a number of well-received papers to the Royal and Wernerian societies of Edinburgh on zoological subjects, including a paper suggesting that the "Hottentot" or "Bosjesman" Khoe and San people descended from "Mongolic" Chinese people. Soon after his election he submitted a plan to the Royal College of Surgeons of Edinburgh for a Museum of Comparative Anatomy, which was accepted, and on 13 January 1825 he was appointed curator of the museum with a salary of £100.

In 1825, John Barclay offered him a partnership at his anatomy school in Surgeon's Square, Edinburgh. In order for his lectures to be recognised by the Edinburgh College of Surgeons, Knox had to be admitted to its fellowship; a formality, but, at £250, an expensive one. At this time most professorships were in the gift of the town council, resulting in such uninspiring teachers as the professor of anatomy Alexander Monro, who put off many of his students (including the young Charles Darwin who took the course 1825–1827). This created a demand for private tuition, and the flamboyant Knox—in sole charge after Barclay's death in 1826—had more students than all the other private tutors put together.

He turned his sharp wit on the elders and the clergy of the city, satirising religion and delighting his students. Knox routinely referred to the Bridgewater Treatises as the "bilgewater treatises" and his 'continental' lectures were not for the squeamish. John James Audubon was in Edinburgh at the time to find subscribers for his Birds of America. Shown round the dissecting theatre by Knox, "dressed in an overgown and with bloody fingers", Audubon reported that "The sights were extremely disagreeable, many of them shocking beyond all I ever thought could be. I was glad to leave this charnel house and breathe again the salubrious atmosphere of the streets". Knox's school flourished and he took on three assistants, Alexander Miller, Thomas Wharton Jones and William Fergusson.

=== Marriage and personal life ===
Little is known of Knox's wife, Susan Knox, whom he married in 1824. According to Knox's friend and student Henry Lonsdale the marriage was kept secret as she was 'of inferior rank.' During his time in Edinburgh, Knox lived at 4 Newington Place with his sisters Mary and Jessie, while Susan and his four children lived at Lilliput Cottage in Trinity, west of Leith. They had seven children, but only two of them survived into adulthood.

Robert also had a younger brother, who later became a surgeon, Frederick John Knox.

=== West Port murders ===
Before the Anatomy Act 1832 widened the supply, the main legal supply of corpses for anatomical purposes in the UK were those condemned to death and dissection by the courts. This led to a chronic shortage of legitimate subjects for dissection, and this shortage became more serious as the need to train medical students grew, and the number of executions fell. In his school Knox ran up against the problem from the start, since—after 1815—the Royal Colleges had increased the anatomical work in the medical curriculum. If he taught according to what was known as 'French method' the ratio would have had to approach one corpse per pupil.

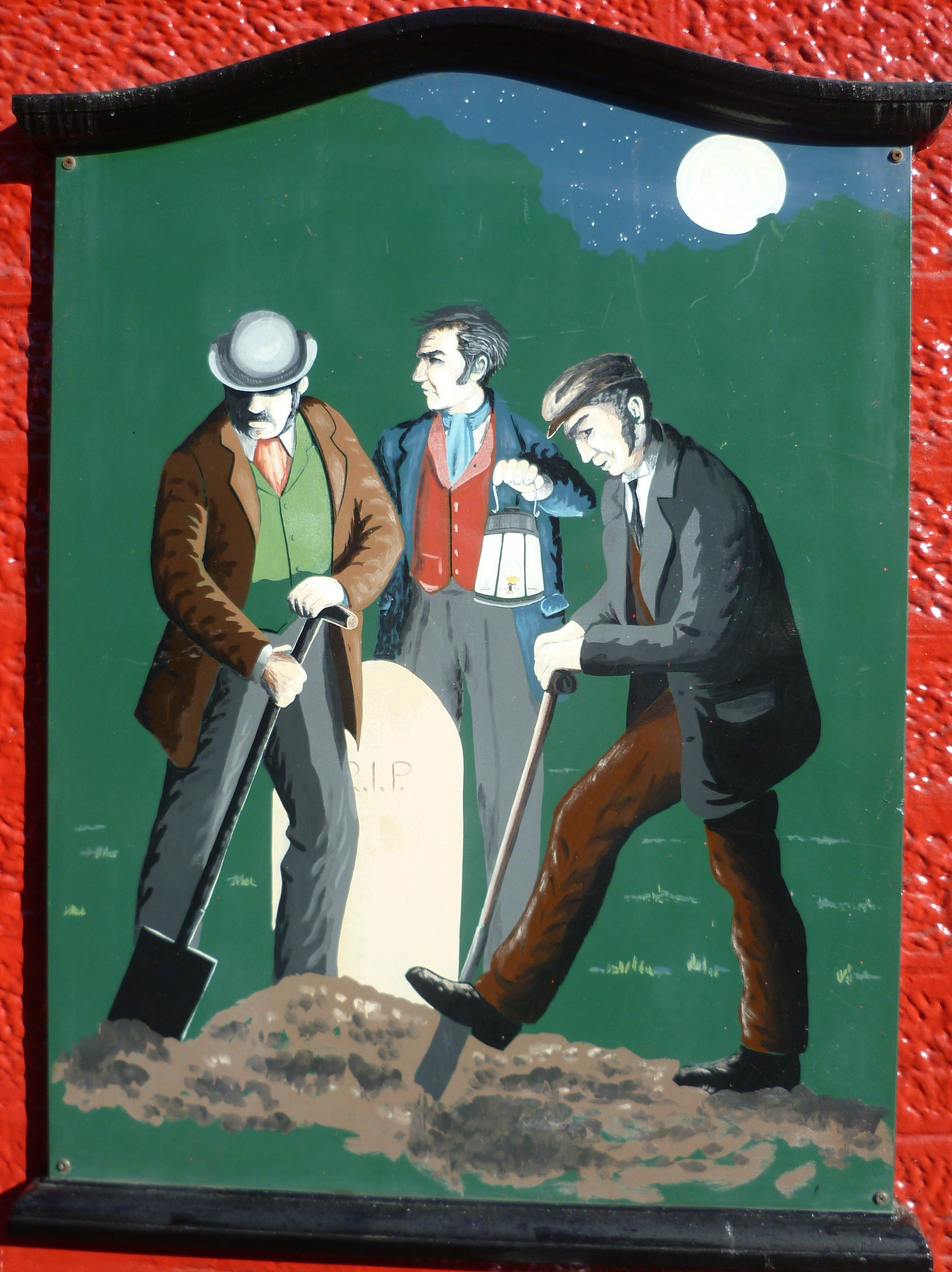
A modern depiction of body snatchers at work

As a consequence, body-snatching became so prevalent that it was not unusual for relatives and friends of someone who had just died to watch over the body until burial, and then to keep watch over the grave after burial, to stop it being violated.

In November 1827, William Hare began a new career when an indebted lodger died on him by chance. He was paid £7.10s (seven pounds & ten shillings) for delivering the body to Knox's dissecting rooms at Surgeons' Square. Now Hare and, his friend and accomplice, William Burke, set about murdering the city’s poor on a regular basis. After 16 more transactions, each netting £8-10, in what later became known as the West Port Murders, on 2 November 1828 Burke and Hare were caught, and the whole city convulsed with horror, fed by ballads, broadsides, and newspapers, at the reported deeds of the pair. Hare turned King's evidence, and Burke was hanged, dissected and his remains were displayed.

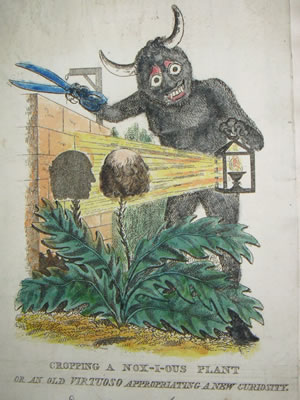
A caricature of Dr. Knox, depicting him as a demon harvesting bodies

Knox was not prosecuted, which outraged many in Edinburgh. His house was attacked by a mob of 'the lowest rabble of the Old Town,' and windows were broken. A committee of the Royal Society of Edinburgh exonerated him on the grounds that he had not dealt personally with Burke and Hare, but there was no forgetting his part in the case, and many remained wary of him.

Almost immediately after the Burke and Hare case, the Royal College of Surgeons of Edinburgh began to harry him, and by June 1831 they had procured his resignation as curator of the museum he had proposed and founded. In the same year he was obliged to resign his army commission to avoid further service in the Cape. This removed his last source of guaranteed income, but his classes were more popular than ever, with a record 504 students. His school moved to the grander premises of Old Surgeons' Hall in 1833 but his class declined after Edinburgh University made its own practical anatomy class compulsory in the mid-1830s. Knox continued to purchase cadavers for his dissection class from such shadowy figures as the 'Black Bull Man', but after the 1832 Anatomy Act made bodies more available to all anatomists, he quarrelled with HM Inspector of Anatomy over the supply of bodies, and his competitive edge was lost. In 1837 Knox applied for the chair in pathology at Edinburgh University but his candidature was blocked by eleven existing professors, who preferred to abolish the post rather than appoint him. In 1842 he was unable to make payments to the Edinburgh funeratory system, from which bodies were supplied to private schools, and he relocated to Glasgow where, still short of subjects for dissection, he closed his school in 1844. In 1847 the Royal College of Surgeons of Edinburgh found him guilty of falsifying a student's certificate of attendance (not an uncommon practice in private schools) and refused to accept any further certificates from him, effectively banning him from teaching in Scotland. In the same year he was expelled from the Royal Society of Edinburgh and had his election retrospectively cancelled.

=== London ===
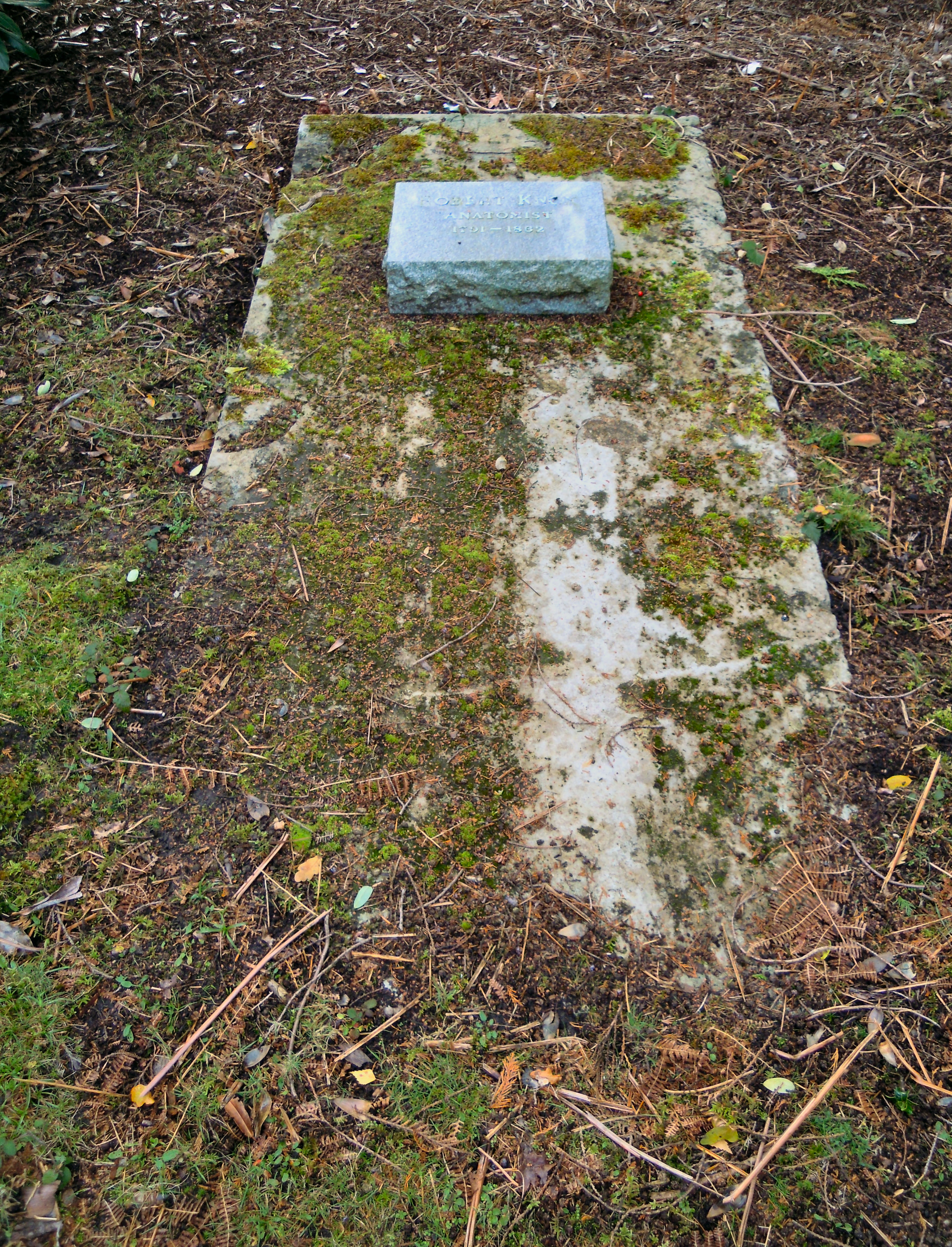
Knox's grave in Brookwood Cemetery

Knox left for London after the death of his wife (the remaining children were left with a nephew). He found it impossible to find a university post, and from then until 1856 he worked on medical journalism, gave public lectures, and wrote several books, including his most ambitious work, The Races of Men in which he argued that each race was suited to its environment and "perfect in its own way." Additionally, Knox wrote a book on fishing in Scotland, which became his best-selling work. In 1854 his son Robert died of heart disease; Knox tried for a posting to the Crimea but at 63 was judged too old.

In 1856 he became the pathological anatomist to the Free Cancer Hospital, London. He joined the medical register at its inception in 1858 and practiced obstetrics in Hackney. On 27 November 1860 he was elected an Honorary Fellow of the Ethnological Society of London, where he spoke in public for the last time on 1 July 1862. He continued working at the Cancer Hospital until shortly before his death on 20 December 1862, at 9 Lambe Terrace in Hackney. He was buried at Brookwood Cemetery near Woking, Surrey.

== Ethnology and racism ==
Knox's interest in race began as an undergraduate. His relevant political views were radical: he was an abolitionist and anti-colonialist who criticised the Boer as "the cruel oppressor of the dark races." Knox is generally considered to be a polygenist; however, some have argued that he was a monogenist, including biographer Alan Bates, who considers such claims to be "exaggerated." Robert Knox once wrote that he believed all human races to descend from an original 'Caucasian' race. In his best-selling work, The Races of Men (1850), a "Zoological history" of mankind, Knox exaggerated supposed racial differences in support of his project, asserting that, anatomically and behaviourally, "race, or hereditary descent, is everything." He offered crude characterisations of each racial group: for example the Saxon (in which race he included himself) "invents nothing", "has no musical ear", lacks "genius", and is so "low and boorish" that "he does not know what you mean by fine art." No race was without its redeeming features, however; Knox described Saxons as "[t]houghtful, plodding, industrious beyond all other races, [and] a lover of labour for labour's sake." Such supposed racial characteristics meant that each race was naturally fitted for a particular environment and could not endure outside it. While Knox maintained that all races were capable of some form of civilized life, he maintained that a vast gulf stood between the limited attainments available to the 'negroid' and to most 'mongoloid' races on one hand and the much greater past achievements and future potential of white men on the other. The Black, Knox remarked, "is no more a white man than an ass is a horse or a zebra." Ultimately however, all races were "[d]estined ... to run, like all other animals, a certain limited course of existence", it mattering "little how their extinction is brought about". In 1862 Knox took the opportunity of a second edition of The Races of Men to defend the "much maligned races" of the Cape against accusations of cannibalism, and to rebuke the Dutch for treating them like "wild beasts".

From the perspective of a Lowland Scot Protestant, Knox's racist works espoused extreme racial hostility to Celts in general (including the Highland Scots and Welsh people, but particularly the Irish people). Due to what he observed to be a prevalence of the "peculiar Mongol face" in many Highland Scots, Knox once suggested that he considered Highland Scots to descend from an early migration of "Mongol races". He considered the "Caledonian Celt" as touching "the end of his career: they are reduced to about one hundred and fifty thousand" and that the "Welsh Celts are not troublesome, but might easily become so." For Knox, "the Irish Celt is the most to be dreaded" and openly advocated their ethnic cleansing around the time that the Great Famine was happening, stating in The Races of Men: A Fragment (1850): "The source of all evil lies in the race, the Celtic race of Ireland. There is no getting over historical facts. Look at Wales, look at Caledonia; it is ever the same. [...] The race must be forced from the soil; by fair means, if possible; still they must leave. The Orange club of Ireland is a Saxon confederation for the clearing the land of all Papists and Jacobites; this means Celts. If left to themselves, they would clear them out, as Cromwell proposed, by the sword; it would not require six weeks to accomplish the work. But the Encumbered Estates Relief Bill will do it better."

== Transcendentalism ==
In his writings Knox synthesised a perspective on nature from three of the most influential natural historians of his time. From Cuvier, he took a consciousness of the great epochs of time, of the fact of extinction, and of the inadequacy of the biblical account. From Étienne Geoffroy St-Hilaire and Henri Marie Ducrotay de Blainville, he gained a spatial and thematic perspective on living things. If one had the skill, all living beings could be arranged in their correct placing in a notional table, and one would see both internally and externally the elegant variation of their organs and anatomy according to the principles of connection, unity of composition and compensation.

Goethe is another crucial addition to the Knoxian way of looking at nature. Goethe thought that there were transcendental archetypes in the living world which could be perceived by genus. If the natural historian were perspicacious enough to examine the creatures in this correct order he could perceive—aesthetically—the archetype that was immanent in the totality of a series, although present in none of them.

Knox wrote that he was concerned to prove the existence of a generic animal, "or in other terms, proving hereditary descent to have a relation primarily to genus or natural family". This way, he could lay claim to a stability in the natural order at the level of the genus, but let species be extinguished. Man was a genus; not a species.

== Evolution ==
According to Richards, The Races of Men advocated "a common material origin of life and its evolution by a process of saltatory descent"; that is to say, new species arose not by gradual change but by sudden leaps due to shifts in embryonic development. Knox tentatively concluded that "simple animals ... may have produced by continuous generation the more complex animals of after ages . . . the fish of the early world may have produced reptiles, then again birds and quadrupeds; lastly, man himself?" Newly formed species survived or perished according to external conditions, which acted as "potent checks to an infinite variety of forms". For one contemporary reviewer, his claim that "Species is the product of external circumstances, acting through millions of years" was "bold, disgusting, and gratuitous atheism." In modern terms, he proposed a theory of saltatory evolution, in which "deformations" in embryonic development produced "hopeful monsters" that, if fortuitously suited to the prevailing environmental conditions, gave rise to new species in a single, macroevolutionary leap. In 1857 he wrote: "The conversion of one of these species into another cannot be so difficult a matter with Nature, especially when all or most of the specific characters are already present in the young. Thus a given species may perish, but another of the same consanguinité takes its place in space: it is a question of time... Thus parenté extends from species to genus and from genus to class and order, in characters not to be misunderstood."

== Legacy ==
Knox is commemorated in the scientific name of a species of African lizard, Meroles knoxii.

== Knox in fiction ==
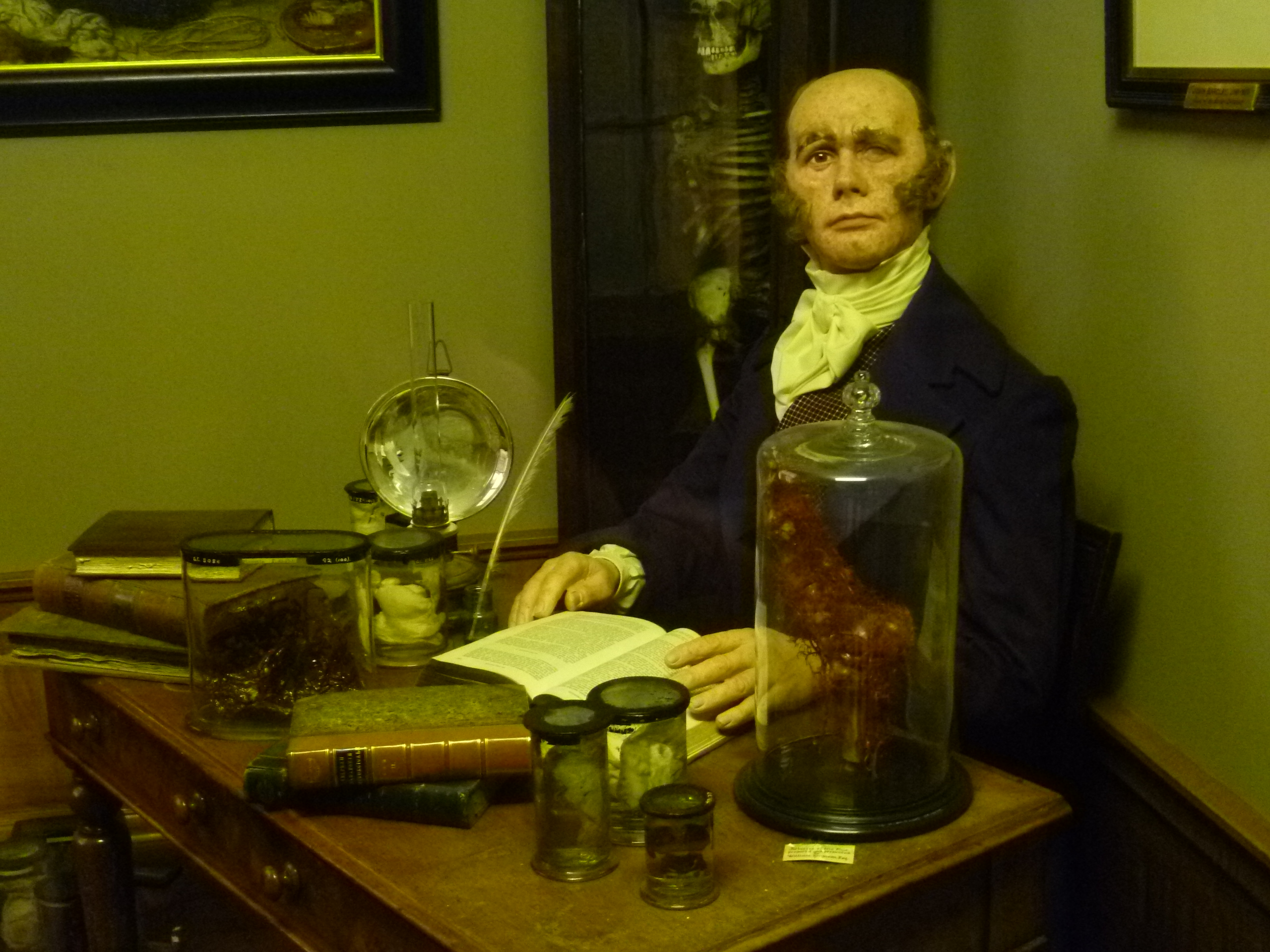
Knox, as portrayed in Edinburgh's Surgeons' Hall Museum

- An Amazon original anthology television series Lore features Burke and Hare murders case in its Season 2 episode 1 named " Burke and Hare: In the Name of Science" released on 19 October 2018.
- Peter Cushing plays Knox in The Flesh and the Fiends (1960). Written and directed by John Gilling, the film is a reasonably accurate depiction, allowing for some dramatic licence and time constraints, of the Burke and Hare story.
- The Anatomist (1961) Alastair Sim as Knox. This was based on a 1930 play of the same name by James Bridie, which the BBC broadcast in 1939 with Knox played by Andrew Cruickshank and in 1980 with Patrick Stewart as Knox.
- John Hoyt played Knox in an episode of the Alfred Hitchcock Hour based on the Burke and Hare murders.
- The character Thomas Rock in the Dylan Thomas play The Doctor and the Devils is based on Knox. The play was filmed in 1985 with Timothy Dalton as Dr Rock.
- Knox was the model for the character of Thomas Potter in Matthew Kneale's epic novel English Passengers, which deals with the perceptions and perspectives of different races, nationalities and stations in society.
- The Knox scandal forms the background of Robert Louis Stevenson's short story "The Body Snatcher" (1884) The character Mr K- in the short story "The Body Snatcher" by Robert Louis Stevenson, is clearly a reference for Robert Knox. Later filmed The Body Snatcher in 1945, starring Boris Karloff and Bela Lugosi; and TV (1966), both mentioning the West Port murders.
- In Burke & Hare, the last film of veteran director Vernon Sewell, Knox is portrayed by Harry Andrews.
- The character Doctor Knox from manga series Fullmetal Alchemist from 2001 (which got an animation adaptation in 2009) is probably a reference to the real Robert Knox since both have the same name, physical similarities and were military surgeons specialising in autopsies and Pathologists.
- Knox is a major character in Nicola Morgan's 2003 novel Fleshmarket.
- Leslie Phillips played a version of Knox in the 2004 Doctor Who audio drama Medicinal Purposes, which pitted the Sixth Doctor (Colin Baker) against another time-traveller (Phillips) who had taken the place of the historical Knox, and was manipulating the events of the Burke and Hare murders.
- The Horrible Histories TV series (Series 1, Episode 13) includes a sketch about Robert Knox, in which the story of the body-snatching cases is told in a song. Knox is played by Mathew Baynton and Burke and Hare by Simon Farnaby and Jim Howick respectively.
- Knox was played by Tom Wilkinson in the 2010 black comedy Burke and Hare.
- Knox was played by Marc Wootton in Episode 2 of Drunk History Comedy Central (2015)
- In 1942 the Dutch author Johan van der Woude published his Anatomie: Een Episode uit de Geschiedenis der Chirurgie, later published as Schandaal om Dr Knox, which is a historical novel about Knox and the Burke and Hare affair.
- In 1972 the television show Night Gallery (episode #70 "Deliveries in the Rear"), a callous surgeon (loosely based on Knox) turns a blind eye to "resurrectionists" who murder to supply corpses for anatomy classes – until he goes insane upon finding the latest victim is his fiancée.

== Works ==
- Engravings of the nerves: copied from the works of Scarpa, Soemmering and other distinguished anatomists. Edinburgh 1829. [Edward Mitchell, engraver]
- The races of men: a fragment. Renshaw, London. 1850, revised 1862.
- Great artists and great anatomists: a biographical and philosophical study. Van Voorst, London 1852.
- A manual of artistic anatomy 1852.
- Fish and fishing in the lone glens of Scotland, with a history of the propagation, growth and metamorphoses of the Salmon. Routledge, London 1854.
- Man – his structure and physiology 1857.
