= The Body Snatcher =

1884 short story by Robert Louis Stevenson

- Short story by Robert Louis Stevenson
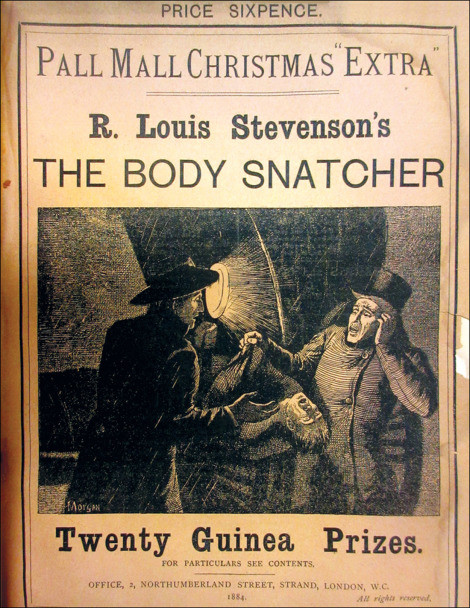
- Country: Scotland
- Language: English
- Genre: Supernatural horror

Publication
- Publication type: Newspaper
- Publisher: The Pall Mall Gazette
- Media type: Print (Newspaper)
- Publication date: December 1884

"The Body Snatcher" is a short story by the Scottish author Robert Louis Stevenson. First published in The Pall Mall Gazette in December 1884, its characters were based on criminals in the employ of the surgeon Robert Knox around the time of the notorious Burke and Hare murders in 1828.

== Plot summary ==
A group of friends are having a few drinks when an eminent doctor, Wolfe Macfarlane, enters. One of the friends, Fettes, recognises the name and angrily confronts the new arrival. Although his friends find this behaviour suspicious, none of them can understand what might lie behind it. It turns out that Macfarlane and Fettes had attended medical school together under Mr. K, an anatomy professor. Their duties included taking receipt of bodies for dissection and paying the pair of shifty and suspicious men who supplied them.

On one occasion, Fettes identifies a body as that of a woman that he knew and is convinced that she has been murdered. However, Macfarlane talks him out of reporting the incident, lest they both become implicated in the crime.

Later, Fettes meets Macfarlane at a tavern, along with a man named Gray, who treats Macfarlane rudely. The following night, Macfarlane brings Gray's body as a dissection sample. Although Fettes is now certain that his friend has committed murder, Macfarlane again convinces him to keep his silence, persuading him that if he is not courageous enough to perform such manly deeds as these, then he will end up as just another victim. The two men do ensure that the body is comprehensively dissected, destroying any forensic evidence.

Fettes and Macfarlane continue their work without being implicated in any crime. However, when a shortage of bodies leaves their mentor in need, then they are sent to a country churchyard to exhume a recently buried woman. Driving back with the body seated between them, they begin to feel nervous and stop to take a better look. They are shocked to discover that the body between them is that of Gray, which they thought that they had destroyed.

== Adaptations in other media ==
The 1945 film The Body Snatcher was loosely based on the short story. The film was produced by Val Lewton and directed by Robert Wise, and starred Boris Karloff, Henry Daniell and Bela Lugosi.

The movie The Flesh and the Fiends (1960) tells the story of Dr. Knox (Peter Cushing) and his association with Burke and Hare.

A television film was made of the story in 1966, directed by Toby Robertson, broadcast as the second episode of Mystery and Imagination. Only audio recordings of the production are known to survive.

"The Body-Snatcher", published in the Warren magazine Creepy No. 7 (February 1966), was adapted by Archie Goodwin and illustrated by Reed Crandall. The story is slightly altered: Fettes is Dr "Toddy" MacFarlane's laboratory assistant rather than a fellow student of Dr Knox.

The story was adapted for radio by Ian Martin for a 1974 episode of CBS Radio Mystery Theater starring Howard Da Silva, Ralph Bell, Court Benson, Patricia Elliott, and Ken Harvey. The story was adapted for radio again in 1980 as part of the Canadian Broadcasting Corporation series Nightfall.

An atmospheric audio version of the story was released in 2023 by Audible Originals on the collection Ghost Stories: Stephen Fry's Definitive Collection, narrated by Stephen Fry.
