= Richard Bayley =

American physician and surgeon

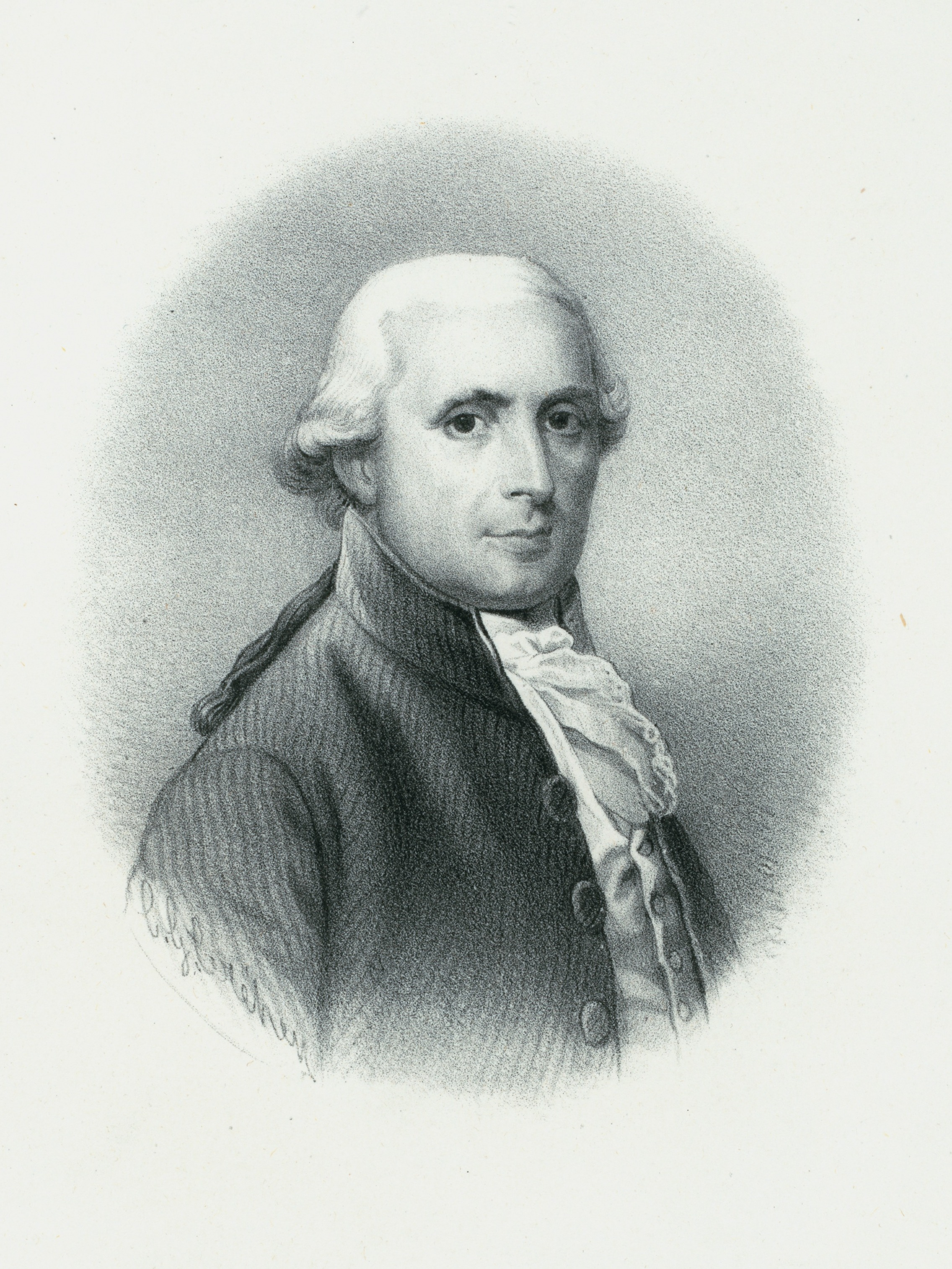
- Born: 1745; Fairfield, Connecticut Colony
- Died: August 17, 1801 (aged 55–56); Staten Island, New York, US
- Cause of death: Yellow fever
- Resting place: St. Andrew's Church (Staten Island, New York); 40°34′22.3″N 74°8′50.5″W
- Occupation: Physician
- Known for: First NYC Health Officer
- Term: c. 1796–1801
- Children: Elizabeth Ann Bayley Seton
- Relatives: James Roosevelt Bayley, grandson

Richard Bayley (1745 – August 17, 1801) was a New York City physician and the first chief health officer of the city. An expert in yellow fever, he helped discover its epidemiology, improved city sanitation, and authored the federal Quarantine Act of 1799. The 1788 Doctors' Riot was sparked by fears that his students were secretly removing corpses from graves in order to dissect them.

== Biography ==
Bayley was born in 1745 in Fairfield, then in the Colony of Connecticut, to a family of French Huguenot and English descent, based in New Rochelle, New York. In 1766 he was apprenticed to New York City physician John Charlton. Bayley married John's sister, Catherine Charlton, at St. John's Episcopal Church (Elizabeth, New Jersey) in 1767; her father was the rector of St. Andrew's Church (Staten Island, New York). The couple had three children, Mary Magdalen (b. 1768, m. 1790 to Wright Post, d. April 9, 1856), Elizabeth Ann (1774-1821, later known as Mother Seton, and the first native-born citizen of the United States to be declared a saint), and Catherine (1776–8).

Richard Bayley traveled to London in 1769, where he studied anatomy with William Hunter. Bayley returned to the United States in 1772, where he opened a practice with Charlton, his father-in-law and former instructor. He returned to England in 1775 to continue his work with Hunter.

A Loyalist, Bayley returned to America and enlisted in the British army as a surgeon at the start of the American Revolution and was stationed in Newport, Rhode Island. In 1777, however, the illness of his wife caused him to return to New York, where she died in May. He took no further part in the conflict. Thirteen months after his first wife's death, he married Charlotte Amelia Barclay. Three daughters and four sons were born of this marriage: Richard, Andrew Barclay, Charlotte Amelia, William, Mary Fitch, Guy Carleton (b. 1786), and Helen. Guy's son James Roosevelt Bayley became a Roman Catholic Bishop and Archbishop. They later separated.

Bayley's chief focus in his medical practice was the poor of the city. He helped to found the New York Dispensary, which operated in the Greenwich Village neighborhood well into the 20th century. He was the first American surgeon to successfully amputate an arm at the shoulder. By 1783, Bayley had begun performing cataract surgery. His laboratory was attacked in the 1788 Doctors' Riot, which was sparked by public outrage at the illegal procurement of corpses for dissection. His anatomical collection was destroyed, but he escaped without injury. In 1792 he began to teach anatomy and surgery at Kings College of New York.

He began studies of yellow fever when the disease broke out in New York in 1795. His work helped discover its epidemiology. As a result, around 1796, he was appointed as the first health officer of the Port of New York, in charge of a quarantine station in what is now Tompkinsville, Staten Island.

In 1797 the newly created Board of Health Commissioners was given the authority to make ordinances for cleaning the city. Efforts to address standing water and sewage in the streets where the soap and candle makers worked, prompted the soap boilers and tallow chandlers talk of petitioning the Legislature for a removal of the Health Officer. He authored the federal Quarantine Act of 1799.

Bayley contracted yellow fever while checking a ship that had just arrived from Ireland and died from it on August 17, 1801. He was buried in the cemetery of the church served by his father-in-law.

== Legacy ==
Bayley Seton Hospital, once located in the Clifton section of Staten Island, was named for both Bayley and his daughter, Elizabeth. It was founded and run by the Sisters of Charity of New York, until 2006.
