= A&B =

A&B may refer to:

- Above & Beyond (band)
- Alexander & Baldwin, an American company
- Allison & Busby, a London publisher
- Alston & Bird, an international law firm based in Atlanta, Georgia
- Antigua and Barbuda, a country
- Arbogast & Bastian (A&B Meats), a defunct meat-packing company based in Allentown, Pennsylvania, US
- Assault and battery (disambiguation)
- Roman Catholic Diocese of Arundel and Brighton, England
- A&B, a bit signaling procedure used in SF (D4) framed T1 transmission facilities
