= Ancient Tombs in Jungbu-dong, Yangsan =

Tombs in Yangsan, South Korea

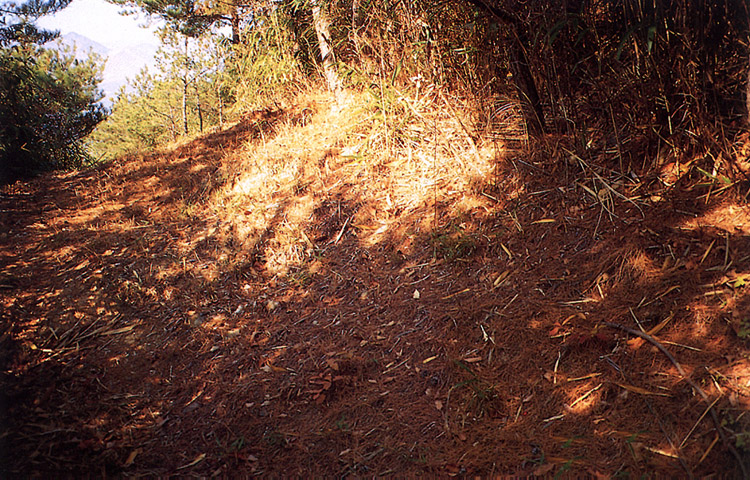
- Some of the tombs
- Interactive map of Ancient Tombs in Jungbu-dong, Yangsan
- Location: Yangsan, South Korea
- Coordinates: 35°20′26″N 129°2′44″E

Historic Sites of South Korea
- Designated: 1963-01-21

The Ancient Tombs in Jungbu-dong, Yangsan (Korean: 양산 중부동 고분군; Hanja: 梁山中部洞古墳群) are tombs now in Yangsan, South Korea. On January 21, 1963, they were designated a Historic Site of South Korea.

They are tumulus tombs that were constructed over a long period of time, from the Three Kingdoms of Korea to the Unified Silla periods. They are in generally poor condition, with many having been robbed over time.
