= Assault (disambiguation) =

Assault is a crime and a tort involving physically harming, or threatening to harm, another person.

Assault may also refer to:

== Law ==
- Assault (tort), in common law, an intentional act causing the reasonable apprehension of harmful contact
- Common assault, an offence in English law similar to the above
- Psychic assault, a term sometimes used as a synonym for assault to distinguish from the crime of battery

== Arts and entertainment ==
=== Films ===
- Assault (film), a 1971 British crime thriller
- The Assault (1936 film), a French drama
- The Assault (1986 film), a Dutch film set in WWII, based on the 1982 Mulisch novel
- The Assault (1996 film), an American action movie
- The Assault (2010 film), a French action thriller
- The Assault (2017 film), an American crime action movie

=== Video games ===
- Assault (1983 video game), a fixed shooter game for the Atari 2600
- Assault (1988 video game), a multi-directional shooter arcade game
- Assault: Retribution, a 1998 video game for the PlayStation console
- Star Fox: Assault, a 2005 video game for the Nintendo GameCube console

=== Other media ===
- The Assault, a 1982 Dutch novel by Harry Mulisch
- Assault Championship Wrestling, Connecticut, U.S.
- "Assault", a 1994 song by Daft Punk

== Other uses ==
- Assault (horse) (1943–1971), a Texas-bred American racehorse
- Assault, a military tactic
- Assault Sethu, fictional gangster in the 2014 Indian film Jigarthanda
