= Depredation =

Depredation may refer to:

- Military raiding, particularly for the purposes of pillage
- Damage to agriculture attributed to pests
- Robbery, especially grave or tomb robbing
