= Body snatching =

Secret removal of corpses from burial sites

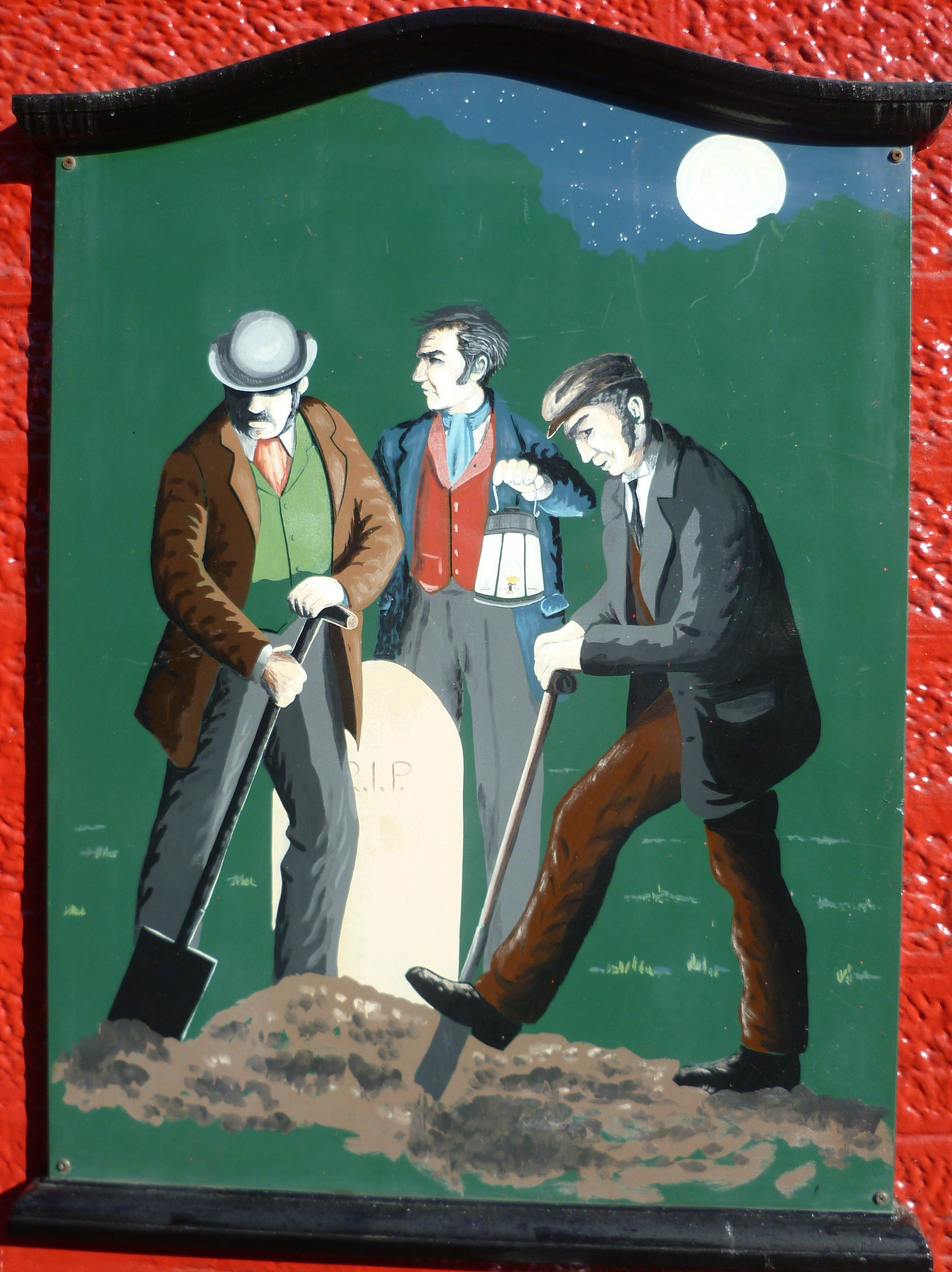
Body snatchers at work. A painting on the wall of a public house in Penicuik, Scotland

Body snatching is the illicit removal of corpses from graves, morgues, and other burial sites. Body snatching is distinct from the act of grave robbery as grave robbing does not explicitly involve the removal of the corpse, but rather theft from the burial site itself. The term 'body snatching' most commonly refers to the removal and sale of corpses primarily for the purpose of dissection or anatomy lectures in medical schools. The term was coined primarily in regard to cases in the United Kingdom and United States throughout the 17th, 18th, and 19th centuries. However, there have been cases of body snatching in many countries, with the first recorded case in Europe dating back to 1319 in Bologna, Italy. The first recorded case in China dates back to 506 BC, when Wu Zixu dug up the corpse of King Ping of Chu to whip it.

Those who practiced the act of body snatching and sale of corpses during this period were commonly referred to as resurrectionists or resurrection men. Resurrectionists in the United Kingdom, who often worked in teams and who primarily targeted more recently dug graves, would be hired in order to provide medical institutions and practitioners with a supply of fresh cadavers for the purpose of anatomical study. Despite a significant decline in body snatching as a practice, there are contemporary instances of body snatching.

== China ==
In some rural areas, ghost marriages are popular. When an unmarried man dies, his family will find a female corpse to bury him together with. As a result, female corpses are often stolen.

== United Kingdom ==
Before the Anatomy Act 1832 (2 & 3 Will. 4. c. 75), the only legal supply of corpses for anatomical purposes in the UK were those condemned to death and dissection by the courts. Dissections, the main way doctors aimed to gain understanding, required fresh corpses. Those who were sentenced to dissection by the courts were often guilty of capital crimes, such as murder, burglary, rape, and arson. However, in 1832, Parliament of the United Kingdom passed the Anatomy Act 1832, which gave doctors and medical students the right to dissect donated bodies for education and research purposes. Although this act was created to stop the illegal tradeoff of corpses, it did not provide near enough corpses needed by medical schools annually, which could be up to 500 in number. This led to increased numbers of body snatching in the United Kingdom.

Interfering with a grave was a misdemeanour at common law, and therefore punishable only with a fine and imprisonment rather than penal transportation or execution. However, dissection of these bodies and theft of items within the graves was illegal. This caused the body snatchers to only take the body and leave everything else behind in the grave. Medical students and staff did not ask where the bodies came from. The trade was a sufficiently lucrative business to run the risk of detection, particularly as the authorities tended to ignore what they considered a necessary evil. Body snatchers had a limited period in which they could dig up a body before it began decomposing, so that the body could be embalmed. They had to remain undetectable while exhuming the bodies and transporting them from the gravesites to the medical facilities.

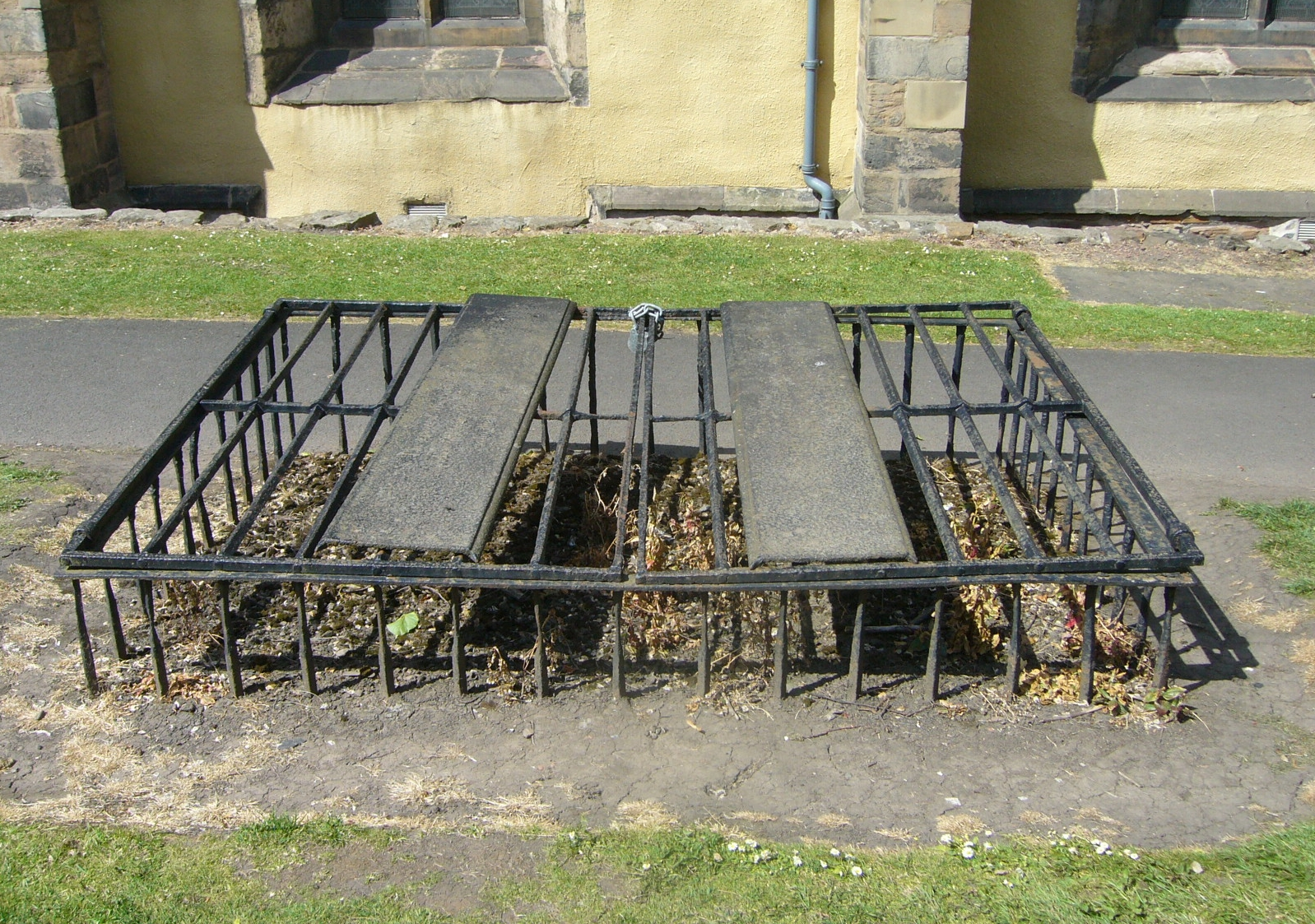
Mortsafe in Greyfriars Kirkyard, Edinburgh

There were several methods used in obtaining a corpse. One such was digging down to the head-end of the coffin and breaking the top open, using a rope or hook to grab the body by its neck and hoist it out of the coffin. Body snatchers were careful to put any clothing, jewelry, and personal belongings back into the coffin before refilling the hole, and trying to smooth out the gravesite as much as possible to look undisturbed. What distinguished body snatching from grave-robbing was the practice of returning belongings to the gravesite before moving on. Removing belongings from the corpse would make them liable to prosecution.

The Lancet reported another method: a manhole-sized square of turf was removed 15 to 20 feet (5 to 6 m) away from the head of the grave, and a tunnel dug to intercept the coffin, which would be about 4 feet (1.2 m) down. The end of the coffin would be pulled off, and the corpse pulled up through the tunnel. The turf was then replaced, and any relatives watching the graves would not notice the small, remote disturbance. The article suggests that the number of empty coffins that have been discovered "proves beyond a doubt that at this time body snatching was frequent".

Body snatching became so prevalent in the UK that it was not unusual for relatives and friends of someone who had just died to watch over the body until burial, and then to keep watch over the grave after burial, to stop it being violated. Iron coffins, too, were used frequently, or the graves were protected by a framework of iron bars called mortsafes, well-preserved examples of which may still be seen in Greyfriars churchyard, Edinburgh.

In relation to body snatching, murder for the purpose of selling the corpses to medical schools also occurred. The term "burked" was coined after William Burke, an Irishman, was found guilty of murdering and selling the bodies of at least 16 people. Burke would pinch the nose of his victims and lay on their chest so that there was no physical damage to the bodies. He was hanged and dissected for his crimes in 1829.

Over time, Parliament passed many laws prohibiting body snatching or similar practices. The Human Tissue Act 2004 created the first overarching law that required informed personal consent for body or organ donation to medical facilities.

== United States ==
Body snatchers generally worked in small groups, which scouted and pillaged fresh graves. Fresh graves were generally given preference since the earth had not yet settled, thus making digging easier. The removed earth was often shoveled onto canvas tarp laid by the grave, so the nearby grounds were undisturbed. Digging commenced at the head of the grave, clear to the coffin. The remaining earth on the coffin provided a counterweight which snapped the partially covered coffin lid (which was covered in sacking to muffle noise) as crowbars or hooks pulled the lid free at the head of the coffin. Usually, the body would be disrobed–the garments thrown back into the coffin before the earth was put back into place.

Resurrectionists have also been known to hire women to act the part of grieving relatives and to claim the bodies of dead at poorhouses. Women were also hired to attend funerals as grieving mourners; their purpose was to ascertain any hardships the body snatchers may later encounter during the disinterment. Bribed servants would sometimes offer body snatchers access to their dead master or mistress lying in state; the removed body would be replaced with weights.

Although medical research and education lagged in the United States compared to medical colleges' European counterparts, the interest in anatomical dissection grew in the United States. With several medical schools being located in Philadelphia, Baltimore, and New York City, these areas were renowned for body snatching activity. Finding subjects for dissection proved to be "morally troubling" for students of anatomy. As late as the mid-19th century, John Gorham Coffin, a prominent aptly named professor and medical physician, wondered how any ethical physician could participate in the trafficking of dead bodies.

Charles Knowlton (1800–1850) was imprisoned for two months in the Worcester (Massachusetts) County Jail for "illegal dissection" in 1824, a couple of months after graduating with distinction from Dartmouth Medical School. His thesis defended dissection on the utilitarian basis that "value of any art or science should be determined by the tendency it has to increase the happiness, or to diminish the misery, of mankind." Knowlton called for doctors to relieve "public prejudice" by donating their own bodies for dissection.

The body of Ohio congressman John Scott Harrison, son of William Henry Harrison, was stolen in 1878 for analysis by Ohio Medical College, and discovered by his son John Harrison, brother of President Benjamin Harrison.

Large, gated, centralized cemeteries, which sometimes employed armed guards, emerged as a response to grave-robbing fears. High-security cemeteries were also a response to the discovery that many old urban and rural burial grounds were found to be practically empty of their human contents when downtown areas were re-developed and old pioneer cemeteries moved, as in Indianapolis.

=== Use in medical schools ===
The demand for cadavers for human dissection grew as medical schools were established in America. This was due to the demand for students to have more first-hand experiences with multiple cadavers, rather than observing dissections on only one specimen. The sudden advances in surgery were what brought on this demand for cadavers for medical school students to learn more about internal anatomy. Between the years of 1758 and 1788, only 63 of the 3500 physicians in the colonies had studied abroad, namely at the University of Edinburgh Medical School. Study of anatomy legitimized the medical field, setting it apart from homeopathic and botanical studies. Later, in 1847, physicians formed the American Medical Association, in an effort to differentiate between the "true science" of medicine and "the assumptions of ignorance and empiricism" based on an education without the experience of human dissection. In addition, the medical community wanted to grow medical students’ knowledge and improve their education by creating a licensing system to terminate those who only went to medical school for pleasantry. By requiring training in anatomy as a prerequisite, this demanded the need for cadavers for medical school students for their graduation.

==== University of Pennsylvania Medical School ====
The University of Pennsylvania was the first medical school opened in America. In 1762, John Morgan and William Shippen Jr. founded the medical department of the University of Pennsylvania. Shippen put an advertisement in the Pennsylvania Gazette in November 1762 announcing his lectures about the "art of dissecting, injections, etc." The cost was "five pistoles". In 1765, his house was attacked by a mob, claiming the doctor had desecrated a church's burying ground. The doctor denied this and made known that he only used bodies of "suicides, executed felons, and now and then one from the Potter's Field".

In response to an organized group of grave robbers operating in Philadelphia, the state passed the Pennsylvania Anatomy Act of 1883, which provided legal solutions to supply medical and dental schools with human cadavers for dissection and scientific research and imposed harsher penalties for grave robbing. Senator William James McKnight was a sponsor of this legislation, yet was involved in grave robbing himself after the act was passed.

==== Boston Medical School ====
In Boston, medical students faced similar issues with procuring subjects for dissection. In his biographical notes, John Collins Warren Jr. wrote: "No occurrences in the course of my life have given me more trouble and anxiety than the procuring of subjects for dissection." He continues to tell of the ease his father John Warren had finding subjects during the Revolutionary War, as many soldiers who had died were without relation. These experiences gave John Warren the experience he needed to begin his lectures on anatomy in 1781. His advertisement in the local paper stated the following: "A Course of lectures will be delivered this Winter upon the several Branches of Physick, for the Improvement of all such as are desirous of obtaining medical Knowledge: Those who propose attending, are requested to make Application as soon as possible, as the Course will commence in a few days." It was dated and signed: "Boston 01/01/1781 John Warren, Sec'y, Medical Society."

==== Harvard Medical School ====
Ebenezer Hersey, a physician, left Harvard College £1,000 for the creation of a Professorship in Anatomy in 1770. A year earlier, John Warren and his friends had created a secret anatomic society. This society's purpose was to participate in anatomic dissection, using cadavers that they themselves procured. The group's name was the "Spunkers"; however, speaking or writing the name was prohibited. Often the group used shovels to obtain fresh corpses for its anatomical study.

Harvard Medical School was established November 22, 1782; John Warren was elected Professor of Anatomy and Surgery. When his son was in the college in 1796, the peaceful times provided few subjects. John Collins Warren Jr. wrote: "Having understood that a man without relations was to be buried in the North Burying-Ground, I formed a party ... When my father came up in the morning to lecture, and found that I had been engaged in this scrape, he was very much alarmed."

John Warren's quest for subjects led him to consult with his colleague, W.E. Horner, professor of anatomy at University of Pennsylvania, who wrote back: "Since the opening of our lectures, the town has been so uncommonly healthy, that I have not been able to obtain a fourth part of subjects required for our dissecting rooms."

Warren later enlisted the help of an old family friend, John Revere (son of Paul Revere) to procure subjects for dissection. Revere called upon John Godman who suggested that Warren employ the services of James Henderson, "a trusty old friend and servant" who could "at any time, and almost to any number, obtain the articles you desire".

During this time, there was an intense growth in New England of medical programs, which led to an increase in the need for anatomy cadavers. It was a difficult endeavor to keep a regular supply of bodies for study, and students were sent away to Boston to seek subjects by grave robbing. This caused the public to get involved, and people began to set up grave watchers in graveyards to catch those who were snatching the bodies. This led the students to move to New York to find potential bodies for cadavers, which at this time was not the safest option. People were going to jail and were fined for disturbing the gravesites.

Warren attempted to set up a cadaver provision system in Boston, similar to the systems already set up in New York and Philadelphia. Public officials and burial-ground employees were routinely bribed for entrance to Potter's Field to get bodies. Potter's Field was a public cemetery, which were favored by medical doctors who were in search of bodies to use for their dissections.

In New York, the bodies were divided into two groups–one group contained the bodies of those "most entitled to respect, or most likely to be called for by friends;" the other bodies were not exempt from exhumation. In Philadelphia's two public burying grounds, anatomists claimed bodies regularly, without consideration. "If schools or physicians differed over who should get an allotment of bodies, the dispute was to be settled by the mayor–a high-reaching conspiracy that resulted in a harvest of about 450 bodies per school year."

These medical colleges were targeted by the general public opposed to body snatching, but the medical colleges fought back. One argument was that the medical colleges tried to see them as doing a good thing for the body, since most of the bodies that were taken were ones who did not have loved ones who grieved for them. These schools also attempted to convince the public that the bodies were from a source on the outside, rather than making it look like they had not got permission to take the body.

=== Race and body snatching ===
Public graveyards were not only arranged by social and economic standing, but also by race. New York was 15% Black in the 1780s. Students of local medical schools often took bodies from the segregated section (the Negroes Burying Ground) of Potter's Field, where free Blacks and slaves were buried. In February 1787, a group of free Blacks petitioned the city's common council about the medical students, who "under cover of night ... dig up the bodies of the deceased, friends and relatives of the petitioners, carry them away without respect to age or sex, mangle their flesh out of wanton curiosity and then expose it to beasts and birds".

In the antebellum American South, bodies of enslaved workers were routinely used for anatomical study; in one case that has been studied, 80% of the corpses dissected at Transylvania University in the 1830s and 1840s were African American. The ready availability of such bodies was cited as an incentive to enroll by Southern medical schools such as the Medical College of South Carolina. According to Hampden-Sydney, in Richmond, Virginia, "from the peculiarity of our institutions [slavery], materials [anatomical subjects] can be obtained in abundance, and we believe are not surpassed if equaled by any city in the country". In fact, the ready availability of [Black] corpses was cited as a reason why Richmond would be a good place to found a medical school. The largest burial ground for enslaved and free people of color in the United States, the Shockoe Hill African Burying Ground, is located in Richmond.

The bodies of criminals about to be executed were routinely requested of authorities for this purpose. In 1859, after John Brown's raid on Harpers Ferry, Virginia, the University of Virginia and Winchester Medical College both requested the cadavers of those about to be hanged. Four, three black (Shields Green, John Anthony Copeland Jr., and Jeremiah Anderson), and one white (John Brown's son Watson Brown), were obtained by the latter college. In retaliation, Union troops burned Winchester Medical College in 1862; it never reopened.

In December 1882, it was discovered that six bodies had been disinterred from Lebanon Cemetery and were being taken to Jefferson Medical College for dissection. Philadelphia's African Americans were outraged, and a crowd assembled at the city morgue, where the discovered bodies had been sent. Reportedly, one of the crowd urged the group to swear that they would seek revenge for those who participated in desecration of the graves. Another man screamed when he discovered the body of his 29-year-old brother. The Philadelphia Press broke the story when a teary elderly woman identified her husband's body, whose burial she had afforded only by begging for the $22 at the wharves where he had been employed. Physician William S. Forbes was indicted, and the case led to passage of various Anatomical Acts.

After the public hanging of 39 Dakota warriors in the aftermath of the Dakota War of 1862, a group of doctors removed the bodies under cover of darkness from their riverside grave, and each took some for himself. Doctor William Worrall Mayo received the body of a warrior called "Cut Nose" and dissected it in the presence of other doctors. He then cleaned and articulated the skeleton and kept the bones in an iron kettle in his office. His sons received their first lessons in osteology from this skeleton.

For many years, Native American burial sites have been used for body snatching in the name of science. Usually the bodies would be removed without consent from relatives, and there was no attempt to reach relatives. When these bodies are removed, they were typically given to museums to be put on display. Even if the Tribe or relatives found out about the bodies being on display, they did not have the authority to have the bodies removed and returned. In November 1990 the Native American Protection and Repatriation Act was signed.

During the early 1800s in Michigan the first Indian graves were robbed. Even though it was known at the time that Indian burial sites were considered sacred and should not be tampered with, many still dug up skulls and skeletal remains. In one incident two Indian burial sites were tampered with. In the first site the entire body was taken while in the second the head was cut off. Robert McKain was seen carrying the head back into the barracks with it wrapped in a handkerchief. It was shown that he had previously been accused of taking Indian heads from burial sites to give to paying surgeons.

=== Public outcry ===
On February 21, 1788, the body of a woman was taken from the graveyard of New York City's Trinity Church. A hundred-dollar reward was offered by the rector of the church for information leading to the arrest of the perpetrators. In the Daily Advertiser, many editorial letters were written about the incident: one such writer named Humanio warned that "lives may be forfeit ... should [the body snatchers] persist". There was cause for concern, as body snatching was perceived to be "a daily occurrence".

A famous case of body snatching in the United States was the Doctors' Riot of 1788 in New York City. On April 13, a group of boys playing near the dissection room window of City Hospital peered in. Accounts vary, but one of the boys saw what he thought were his mother's remains or that one of the students shook a dismembered arm at the boys. The boy, whose mother had recently died, told his father of the occurrence. The father, a mason, led a group of laborers in an attack on the hospital. In order to control the destruction of private property, the authorities participated in searches of local physicians' houses for medical students, professors, and stolen corpses, which satisfied the mob. Later, the mob reassembled to attack the jail where some of the medical students were being held for their safety. The militia was called, but few showed; this was perhaps due to the militia sharing the public's outrage. One small troop was harassed and quickly withdrew. Several prominent citizens–including Governor George Clinton; General Baron von Steuben, and John Jay–participated in the ranks of the militia protecting the doctors at the jail. Three rioters were killed when the embattled militia opened fire on the mob, and when militia members from the countryside joined the defense, the mob threat quickly dissipated.

To assuage the outraged public, legislation was enacted to thwart the activities of the body snatchers; eventually, anatomy acts, such as the Massachusetts Anatomy Act of 1831, provided legal means to obtain bodies for anatomy studies.

Prior to these measures allowing for more subjects, many tactics were employed to protect the bodies of relatives. Police were engaged to watch the burying grounds but were often bribed or made drunk. Spring guns were set in the coffins, and poorer families would leave items like a stone or a blade of grass or a shell to show whether the grave was tampered with or not. In his collection of Boston police force details, Edward Savage made notes of a reward offer on April 13, 1814: "The selectmen offer $100 reward for arrest of grave-robbers at South Burying-Ground". Iron fences were constructed around many burying grounds as a deterrent to body snatchers. "Burglar proof grave vaults made of steel" were sold with the promise that loved ones' remains would not be one of the 40,000 bodies "mutilated every year on dissecting tables in medical colleges in the United States". The medical appropriation of bodies aroused much popular resentment. Between 1765 and 1884, there were at least 25 documented crowd actions against American medical schools.

== Other countries ==
=== Australia ===
In 1869, the body of former Queensland police officer Thomas Griffin – who had been convicted of murdering two subordinates and executed by hanging – was exhumed a week after his burial and his head removed. The body was reinterred, but after noticing that the grave had been disturbed the local sexton re-exhumed the body and discovered that it had been decapitated. The perpetrators were never identified, but in the early 20th century it was rumoured that a local surgeon had kept the skull on display in his private collection.

==== Indigenous Australians ====
In Tasmania, the bodies of William Lanne (1835–1869) and Truganini (1812–1876), considered at the time to be the last Aboriginal Tasmanians (Palawa), were both exhumed from their graves. Lanne's head, hands and feet were removed illegally by surgeon William Crowther and members of the Royal Society of Tasmania before he was buried, and the rest of his body was stolen after his burial. Truganini, who outlived Lanne by several years, had wished to avoid his fate and expressly asked to be cremated, but was buried anyway. The Royal Society of Tasmania exhumed her body and put it on display. 100 years after Truganini's death, the Palawa community finally won the rights to their bodies following many years of petitioning the Australian government, and their remains were cremated and spread in the ocean.

Indigenous Australians in mainland Australia were also subject to body snatching attempts by white Australians. In 1910, 12 indigenous bodies were stolen from their burial places along the Australian coast, where their peoples had been forced to settle after being driven away from their ancestral land. The leader of this heist was W.E.L.H. Crowther, an 18-year-old Australian medical student seeking the favor of one of his professors. After obtaining the bodies, Crowther and his associates took them back to Melbourne to undergo further examination.

==== Project Sunshine ====
Project Sunshine was launched during the height of the Cold War as a series of multinational studies concerning the danger posed to humans by radioactive isotopes as a result of nuclear fallout. The Australian government became involved in the program during the mid-1950s, and began collecting body parts from citizens during autopsies, including many children, most often without their next of kin consenting or even being made aware. By the time the program ended in the early 1980s, the Australian government had stolen thousands upon thousands of body parts from deceased Australians to be used for research in Project Sunshine.

=== Canada ===
The practice of body snatching was also common in Canada, where religious customs as well as the lack of means of preservation made it hard for medical students to obtain a steady supply of fresh bodies. In many instances the students had to resort to fairly regular body snatching.

The first medical school established in Canada was 1822 in Montreal. Body-snatching tended to vary between English- and French-speaking students. The French speaking students would steal bodies to pay for their schooling while the English-speaking students stole bodies for fun and were usually caught. The students who stole the bodies for medical use would use elaborate measures to make sure the bodies could not be identified or found if a search was conducted at their residence. Facial identifiers and scars would be removed from the body so that they could not be identified. Students would make elaborate hiding places for the bodies such as using pulley systems to pull bodies up into chimneys or hide bodies under trap doors so that the bodies would not be found. When trying to find a body the robbers would be selective in that they would choose negroes.

In Montreal during the winter of 1875, typhoid fever struck at a convent school. The corpses of the victims were stolen by body snatchers before relatives arrived from the United States, causing an international scandal. Rewards were offered which students collected to return bodies to the families. Eventually the Anatomy Act of Quebec was amended to prevent a recurrence, effectively ending medical body snatching in Quebec.

=== China ===
Burial customs were regulated in China as a part of the Great Qing Legal Code in an attempt to mitigate illicit burial practices. These regulations criminalized the mishandling of corpses, including the removal of a corpse. The term 'body snatching' as it regards China specifically can refer to a variety of rationales and specific cases of corpse removal which range from political to spiritual in motivation:

==== Ghost Marriages ====
A ghost marriage (Chinese: 冥婚; pinyin: mínghūn; lit. 'spirit marriage') is a practice originating in China in which either one or neither of the partners in the marriage is alive. The original purpose of ghost marriages is unclear but it has been utilized as a means of maintaining a family's honor and legacy in the event that their unwed relative is deceased. The practice has led to the theft of female corpses in order to arrange illicit ghost marriages and relocate the body. In 2006 there were reports of a resurgence in the northern coal-mining regions of Shanxi, Hebei and Shandong. Although the practice has long been abandoned in modern China, some superstitious families in isolated rural areas still pay very high prices for the procurement of female corpses for deceased unmarried male relatives. It is speculated that the very high death toll among young male miners in these areas has led more and more entrepreneurial body snatchers to steal female cadavers from graves and then resell them through the black market to families of the deceased. In 2007, a previously convicted grave robber, Song Tiantang, was arrested by Chinese authorities for murdering six women and selling their bodies as "ghost brides".

==== Cremation Quotas ====
The Cultural Revolution in China included a push for funeral reform which mandated the cremation of corpses. The enforcement of this mandate has varied, but there have been instances of body snatching for the purpose of meeting state-mandated quotas for cremation funeral practices. The act of body snatching for the purposes of meeting such quotas has become a lucrative business in China. In 2014 two local funerary practice officials in the Guangdong province of China were arrested for hiring body snatchers to acquire corpses in order to meet cremation quotas.

==== Red Market ====
The Red Market, also known as the organ trade, refers to the trade of human organs or other body parts with the primary purpose being transplantation. In China the illicit trading of human body parts has led to instances of body snatching for use in the Red Market. In order to meet the demand for transplantations China authorized the use of executed prisoners' organs. Consent of prisoners or prisoners' families, though required, has often been unverified in cases of executed prisoners' organs being harvested leading to accusations of illicit harvesting of corpses and transplantations.

=== Cyprus ===
In Cyprus, the former President Tassos Papadopoulos' body was stolen from his grave on 11 December 2009.

=== India ===
For over 200 years, the city of Kolkata, in the north-eastern region of India, has been known to be the center of a network of bone traders who remove skeletons from graveyards in order to sell them to universities and hospitals abroad. During the colonial era, European doctors in the city hired thieves to dig up bodies from local cemeteries. Despite changes in laws, a similar process is going strong today. According to journalist Scott Carney, historically members of the Domar caste, who traditionally performed cremations, were pressed into service processing bones; skeletons were exported from India to be used in anatomy classes worldwide. In the 1850s, Calcutta Medical College processed 900 skeletons a year, but mostly for shipment abroad. A century later, a newly independent India dominated the world market for human bones.

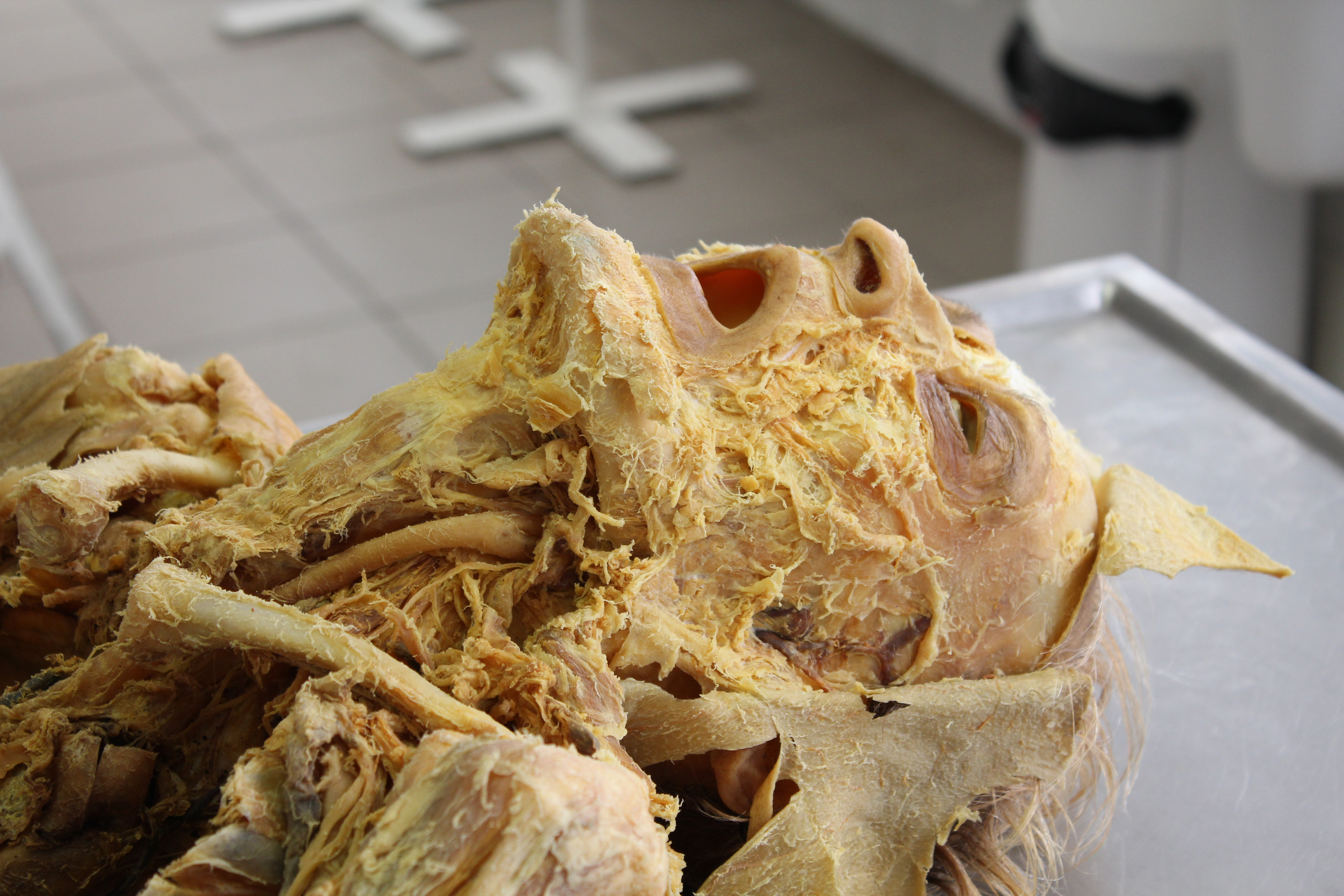
A cadaver in a dissecting room.

At their height, in the early 1980s, Calcutta's bone factories took in an estimated $1 million a year by digging the graveyards of West Bengal after the mourners had left. In 1985 the Indian government banned the export of human bones after human rights groups raised questions about how the bones were being collected and pointed towards the greater need for institutions to obtain informed consent before remains were used for medical research. However, the human organ trade was only forced underground.

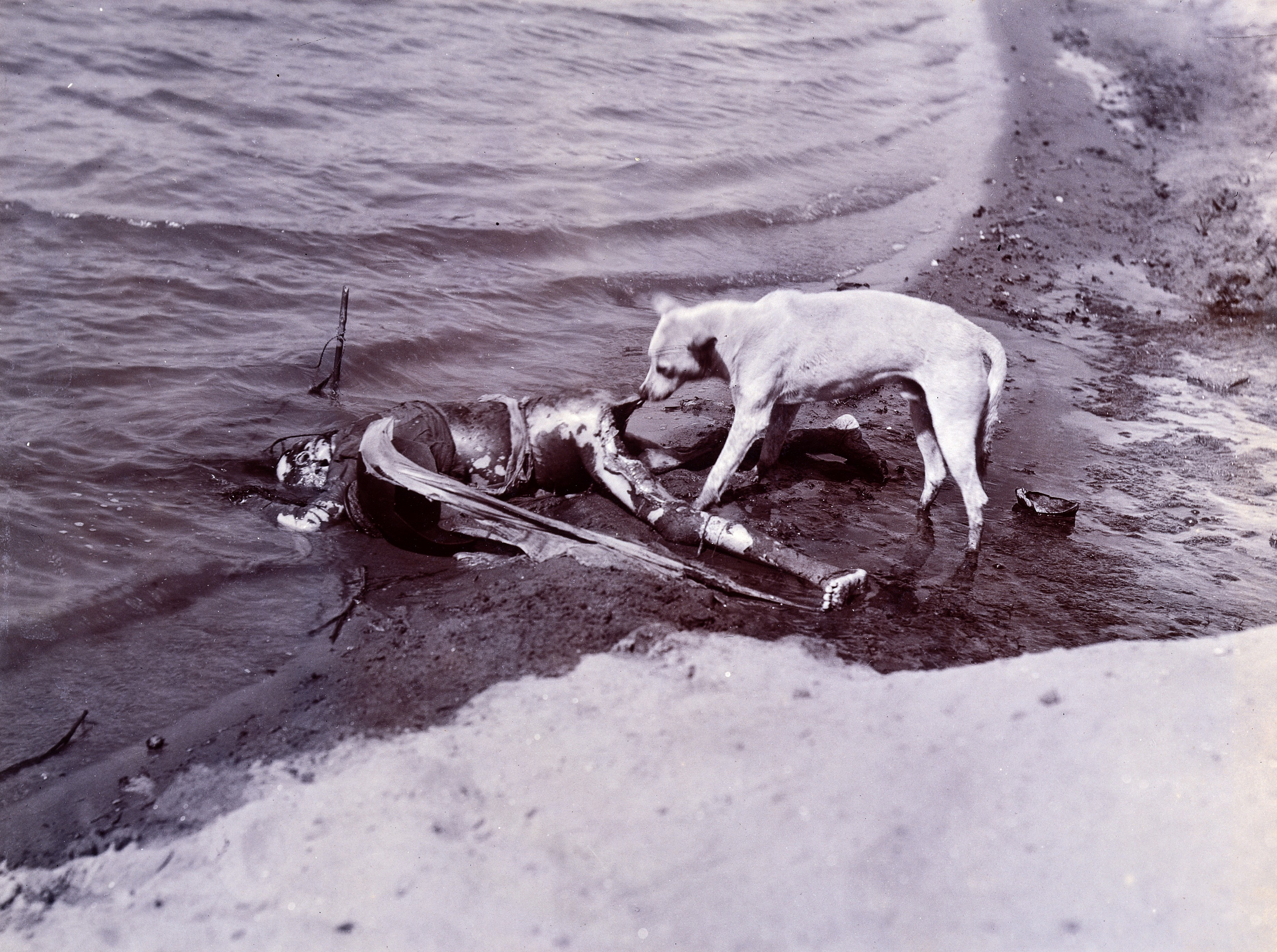
In rural parts of northern India, the lowest classes sometimes cannot obtain wood for cremation or ground for burial, and the exposure of bodies is the result.

The Indian government banned the export of human remains in the mid-1980s, but body snatching is still thriving, even if secretly, in many parts of the country as a result of ineffective laws and poverty.

=== Republic of Ireland ===
In Dublin, the medical schools of the 18th and 19th centuries were on a constant hunt for bodies. The Bullys' Acre or Hospital Fields at Kilmainham was a rich source of anatomical material as it was a communal burial ground and easily accessed. Soldiers attached to the nearby Royal Hospital were always on the alert for grave robbers mainly because many of their comrades were buried there. In November 1825 a sentry captured Thomas Tuite, a known resurrectionist, in possession of five bodies. When searched, his pockets were found to be full of teeth–in those days a set of teeth fetched £1 (about £50 in 2011). Many other graveyards were targets of the medical students or those who made robbing graves their profession. The largest cemetery in Ireland, Glasnevin Cemetery, laid out in the 18th century, had a high wall with strategically placed watch-towers as well as blood-hounds to deter body snatchers.

=== Italy ===
The first recorded case of body snatching is attributed to four medical students from Bologna in 1319. At this time, studying the anatomy of a human cadaver was not particularly favored once Rome fell, and it became prohibited by the Church. What was favored was animal dissections at this time. Until the 15th century, it had become legal in Italy to conduct up to two dissections in public per year after the first body-snatching in the 14th century.

=== The Netherlands ===
In The Netherlands, poorhouses were accustomed to receiving a small fee by undertakers who paid a fine for ignoring burial laws and resold the bodies (especially those with no family) to doctors.

During the 17th century, the period of the Glorious Revolution, medicine in Great Britain and the Netherlands was at the root of body-snatching with the goal of using the corpses to be used for anatomical and physiological learning. Among 17th-century medicine educators at universities the desire to educate the public, in particular, took place in the Dutch Republic of the Netherlands. The Dutch Province of South Holland was home to the Leiden Anatomical Theatre. Leiden Anatomical Theatre was amongst other theatres which was centers of arts and sciences, meeting places for artists and scientists, and places of public function. Leiden's contribution represented the model of the innovative academy and its clinical course, inaugurated in 1638, was widely seen as a center of excellence. At Leiden University Peter Paauw (1564–1617) and Francisus dele Boё Sylvius (1614–1672), who were medical professors who used practical skills which became an integral basic part of the academic curriculum under the direction of Otho Heurnius (1577–1652) The anatomical theater developed into a place of universal knowledge and a representation of the macrocosmos as opposed to the microcosmos of the human body. After the death of Heurnius, Joannes van Horne (1621–1670) became the next caretaker for the anatomical theater.

== Contemporary body snatching ==
=== Argentina ===
In 1974, former de facto President Pedro Eugenio Aramburu's body was stolen by Montoneros. The organization had kidnapped and murdered Aramburu in 1970. The corpse was to be held until President Isabel Perón brought back Eva Perón's body from Italy. It was also an act of revenge for the previous removal of Evita's body. Once Evita's body arrived in Argentina, Montoneros gave up Aramburu's corpse and abandoned it in a street in Buenos Aires.

In 1986, the hands of Juan Perón were stolen from his grave by unknown persons.

=== Hungary ===
The grave of Communist leader János Kádár (1912–1989) at the Kerepesi Cemetery in Budapest was desecrated in early 2007. His skull has been stolen along with some of his other bones and his wife Mária Tamáska's urn. The act was politically motivated, as a message reading "murderers and traitors cannot rest in sacred ground 1956–2006" (taken from a song by far-right rock band Kárpátia) was left nearby. The two dates refer to the Hungarian Revolution of 1956 (Kádár played a major role in the suppression of the revolution), and the 2006 protests in Hungary (a scandal involving a party widely held to be the ideological successor to that of Kádár). As of 2022, the bones and the perpetrators have not been found.

=== India ===
Though it banned the export of human remains in the mid-1980s, India continues to maintain a robust, if under the table, international trade in human skeletons, as journalist Scott Carney indicates.

In 2007, the Indian police discovered a stash of hundreds of human skulls and thigh bones and arrested a gang for allegedly carrying out the practice of body snatching and indulging in bone trade. This gang was arrested after they exhumed dozens of graves from Muslim cemeteries in Burdwan district, and smuggled the skeletons not just to medical institutions in need of cadavers across the world, but also to the Himalayan kingdom of Bhutan for use in Buddhist monasteries. Kamal Sah was caught carrying 67 human skulls and 10 bones on a bus in Chhapra, in the state of Bihar, by fellow passengers who had noticed a jagged bone sticking out of a bag beneath his seat. The investigating officer of the incident, Ravinder Nalwa, reported to a Reuters journalist that, "during the interrogation the gang members confessed that the hollow human thigh bones were in great demand in monasteries and were used as blow-horns, and the skulls as vessels to drink from at religious ceremonies".

Buddhist monks in India likewise admitted that human thigh bones and skulls were used by followers of a Tibetan school of Buddhism. A 2009 report from The National stated that alleged bone smuggler Kamal Sah was identified by civilians in Bihar state and handed over to police with two bags of human skulls and bones. When questioned on the subject, the police refused to acknowledge the authorities' failure to stamp out the practice and simply claimed that the police lacked "equipment, manpower and expertise to stop this practice". The criminal lawyer, Majid Menon, acknowledges that the dire economic conditions for vast numbers of people living in such states as Bihar, West Bengal, Jharkhand and some parts of Uttar Pradesh, have favored the practice of body snatching and given room for bone smugglers to flourish.

According to estimates, 20,000–25,000 human skeletons are smuggled out of India every year through Nepal, China, and Bangladesh. The skeletons reach markets in the US, Japan, Europe and the Middle East, mostly for medical institutions. The price for a complete skeleton in these markets ranges from $700 to $1500 depending on the quality and size. In India, a full skeleton costs around $350 in the open market. Young Brothers, a Calcutta-based bone dealer, sells a human skeleton for $300. While the complete skeletons mostly find their way to medical laboratories mostly in the West, the assorted bones and skulls are used for religious rituals mostly in Hindu and Buddhist-dominated areas. As part of their tantric rituals, many tantrics drink wine in human skulls in places such as Nepal and the state of Assam in India.

And even though to date police have been unable to unearth any irregularity in the skeleton trade, the exporter-turned-moralist, Sanker Narayan Sen, maintains that the people from the Domar caste are often responsible for body snatching and later process the procured cadavers for export. The Government of India had twice earlier banned exports, only to revoke its decision on each occasion. According to the Exporters Association, the CBI in 2014 had once again recently concluded its investigations and submitted a report exonerating such body snatchers and exporters.

=== Spain ===
In April 2000, the skull of antipope Benedict XIII was stolen from the ruined palace of Argillo in Sabiñán, Spain. The thieves sent an anonymous letter to the mayor of Illueca asking for 1,000,000 ₧ (€6,000). The Spanish Civil Guard recovered the skull in September 2000 and found that the thieves were two local brothers. They were sentenced in November 2006 to six months in prison, substituted with €2,190.

=== United Kingdom ===
Rare reports of body snatching continue to occur. One prominent case involved the removal of the remains of Gladys Hammond from Yoxall Churchyard near Lichfield in south Staffordshire in 2004. Hammond's remains were taken by animal rights activists who were campaigning against Darley Oaks Farm, a licensed facility that bred guinea pigs for scientific research. Hammond was the mother-in-law of one of the farm's co-owners. After a four-year investigation by Staffordshire Police, four leaders of the Save the Newchurch Guinea Pigs campaign group (three men: Kerry Whitburn of Edgbaston, John Smith of Wolverhampton, John Ablewhite of Manchester; and one woman: Josephine Mayo of Staffordshire) were jailed for conspiracy to blackmail. The men received 12 years each and the woman received four years. The police said the conspiracy included the removal of Hammond's remains, which were recovered by police following information given by one of the four.

=== United States ===
In February 2006, Michael Mastromarino, then a 42-year-old former New Jersey-based oral surgeon and CEO and executive director of operations at Biomedical Tissue Services, was convicted along with three employees of illegally harvesting human bones, organs, tissue and other cadaver parts from individuals awaiting cremation. Their crimes also included forging numerous consent forms and selling the illegally obtained body parts to medical companies without consent of their families. BTS sold its products to five companies, including Life Cell Corporation of New Jersey, and Regeneration Technologies of Florida.

In 2005, it was discovered that several of the broadcaster Alistair Cooke's bones were removed in New York City and replaced with PVC pipe before his cremation. The director Toby Dye made a documentary titled Body Snatcher of New York about this case in 2010.

There is still a demand for corpses for transplantation surgery in the form of allografts, and modern body snatchers meet this demand. Tissue gained in this way is medically unsafe, as it can cause immunosuppression and create a high risk of infection.

== In popular culture ==
=== Film ===
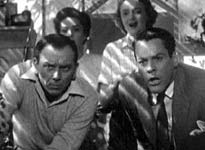
Screenshot from the trailer of Invasion of the Body Snatchers (1956)

- The 1956 science fiction film Invasion of the Body Snatchers, directed by Don Siegel, depicts body snatching as a loss of personal autonomy where aliens take over the bodies of the main characters' loved ones. The movie provided awareness on the issue of body snatching and interest in the history of its uses. Body snatching was portrayed in a new way of the moral consequences and surrounding effect it has on the stolen body's loved ones.
- In the 1985 film The Doctor and the Devils, Timothy Dalton plays an anatomist who runs Edinburgh's School of Anatomy in the 19th century. The characters in this film steal corpses after murdering locals and use them for their medical school.
- In the 2008 film I Sell the Dead, Dominic Monaghan and Larry Fessenden play two men who make a living stealing and selling corpses.

=== Literature ===
- A famous 1884 short story by Robert Louis Stevenson, The Body Snatcher, was adapted into a film starring Boris Karloff and Bela Lugosi. This story accurately portrayed the act of body snatching and common uses in its background, taking inspiration from the Burke and Hare murders with regard to using murder to obtain the bodies for educational purposes. This story and film showed how body snatching was viewed as a dark practice with disturbing elements.
- Two other works mentioning the idea of robbing a grave are The Case of Charles Dexter Ward and Herbert West–Reanimator, both by H.P. Lovecraft. One of the main characters, Joseph Curwen, is a merchant and slave trader who steals corpses of well-known individuals around the world and brings them to Providence to torture them until they share their secrets. This reflects the concept of body snatching as this character secretly removed a corpse from grave sites proving it as an unethical act.
- In the 1985 novel City of Joy written by French Author and Fulbright Scholar, Dominique Lapierre, in order to pay for his daughter's wedding, a dying rickshaw driver sells his bones for science. Hours after demise and before properly mourned, bone traders come to collect his bones. This provides the metaphorical practice of body snatching where a body is surrender, or stolen, and used for science such as in medical schools.
- In Tess Gerritsen's 2007 novel The Bone Garden, set in Boston in 1830, the protagonist Norris Marshall, a talented but poor medical student, attempts to pay his college tuition by working as a "resurrectionist".
- In Mark Twain's 1876 novel The Adventures of Tom Sawyer, Injun Joe murders Dr. Robinson when he and Muff Potter are hired by him for body snatching.
- In Jonathan L. Howards' 2009 novel Johannes Cabal the Necromancer, the eponymous protagonist practices body snatching.
- In Charles Dickens's 1859 novel A Tale of Two Cities, Jerry Cruncher works as a "resurrection man" stealing bodies to resurrect them in addition to his work as a porter and messenger at Tellson's Bank.

=== Music ===
- The Pet Shop Boys' song "The Resurrectionist" appeared as a bonus track on "I'm with Stupid," the first single from their 2006 album Fundamental. The track is inspired by the book The Italian Boy: Murder and Grave-Robbery in 1830s London by Sarah Wise. (See London Burkers)
- The ninth track of leATHERMØUTH's 2009 album XØ, titled "Bodysnatchers 4 Ever", describes a man and his lover taking fresh bodies, which they use in order to live forever.
- The second track on Radiohead's 2007 album In Rainbows is titled "Bodysnatchers".
- The debut single of experimental band Ralph and the Hexagons, "My Weekend Plans", is about an attempted act of body snatching, although this is referred to as grave robbing throughout the song.
- The sixth track of Creature Feature's album It Was A Dark And Stormy Night... is titled "Grave Robber At Large". It is about a stereotypical early 19th century body snatcher, featuring the hook "Death is my business, and business is good!".

== See also ==
- 1788 Doctors' riot
- Anatomy Act 1832
- Anatomy murder
- Eloise Cemetery
- Frankenstein
- Ed Gein
- Anatoly Moskvin
- Murder Act 1751
- Night Doctors
- Posthumous execution – Ceremonial mutilation of a corpse as punishment
- Thomas Sewall
- Stolen body hypothesis – Theory to explain the empty tomb of Jesus
- 1862 Wardsend Cemetery riot
- Chinese ghost marriage
