= Night Witches (disambiguation) =

Night Witches was the German nickname for an all-female Soviet World War II bomber regiment. It may also refer to:

- Night Witch, a comic series in the Rivers of London universe, which refers to the Soviet regiment
- The Night Witches, a comic series about the Soviet regiment, written by Garth Ennis and drawn by Russ Braun
- "Night Witches", a 2014 song from Heroes (Sabaton album) about the Soviet regiment
- Night Doctors, also known as Night Witches, bogeymen in African-American folklore
- "The Night Witches", a 2017 story in the Doctor Who: The Early Adventures series
- Night Witches, a team in the Boulder County Bombers roller derby league
- Night Witches (role-playing game)
