= 1788 doctors' riot =

1788 riot in New York City

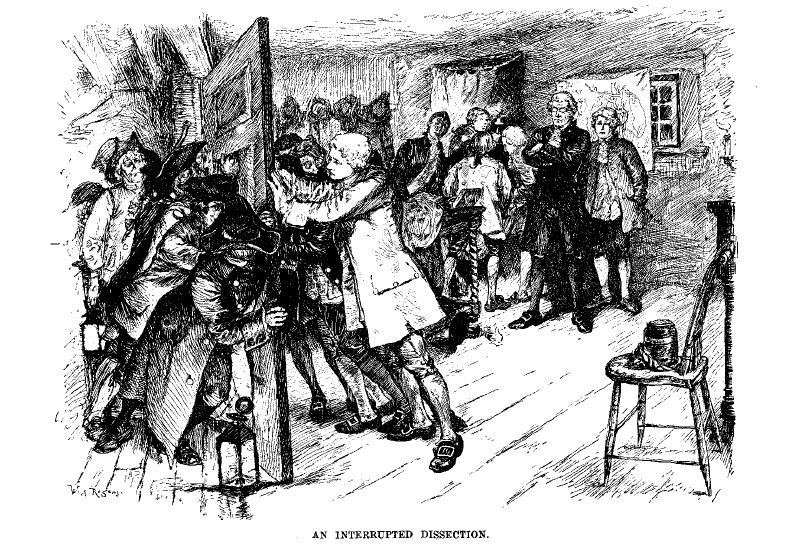
- An interrupted dissection, by William Allen Rogers, Harper's Magazine, October 1882, vol. 65, p. 668
- Date: April 1788
- Location: New York City, United States
- Caused by: Theft of corpses by doctors

Casualties
- Deaths: 6–20

The doctors' riot was an incident that occurred in April 1788 in New York City, where the illegal procurement of corpses from the graves of the recently deceased caused a mass expression of discontent from poorer New Yorkers that was directed primarily at physicians and medical students.

== Background ==
By the end of the American Revolution, roughly one fifth of New York City's population was black, most of whom were slaves. Their low social standing allowed slaves' bodies to be buried only outside the city limits. Most often, they were buried in a few plots north of Chambers Street, across the street from the Pauper's Cemetery, often with several bodies to a grave, in a site now marked by the African Burial Ground National Monument, then known as the "Negroes Burying Ground".

Both cemeteries were close to Columbia College, which housed the city's only school of medicine. Taboos associated with the violation of corpses made it difficult to procure cadavers for dissection and study and throughout the 18th century, the law considered dissection as a worse punishment than death. Many students and doctors would exhume bodies from the nearby graveyards because of the socially-marginalized status of their occupants. "Resurrection", as body-snatching or grave-robbing was called, was the cheapest, surest way to obtain the remains of the newly deceased, especially in the winter, when bodies decayed more slowly.

== Riot ==
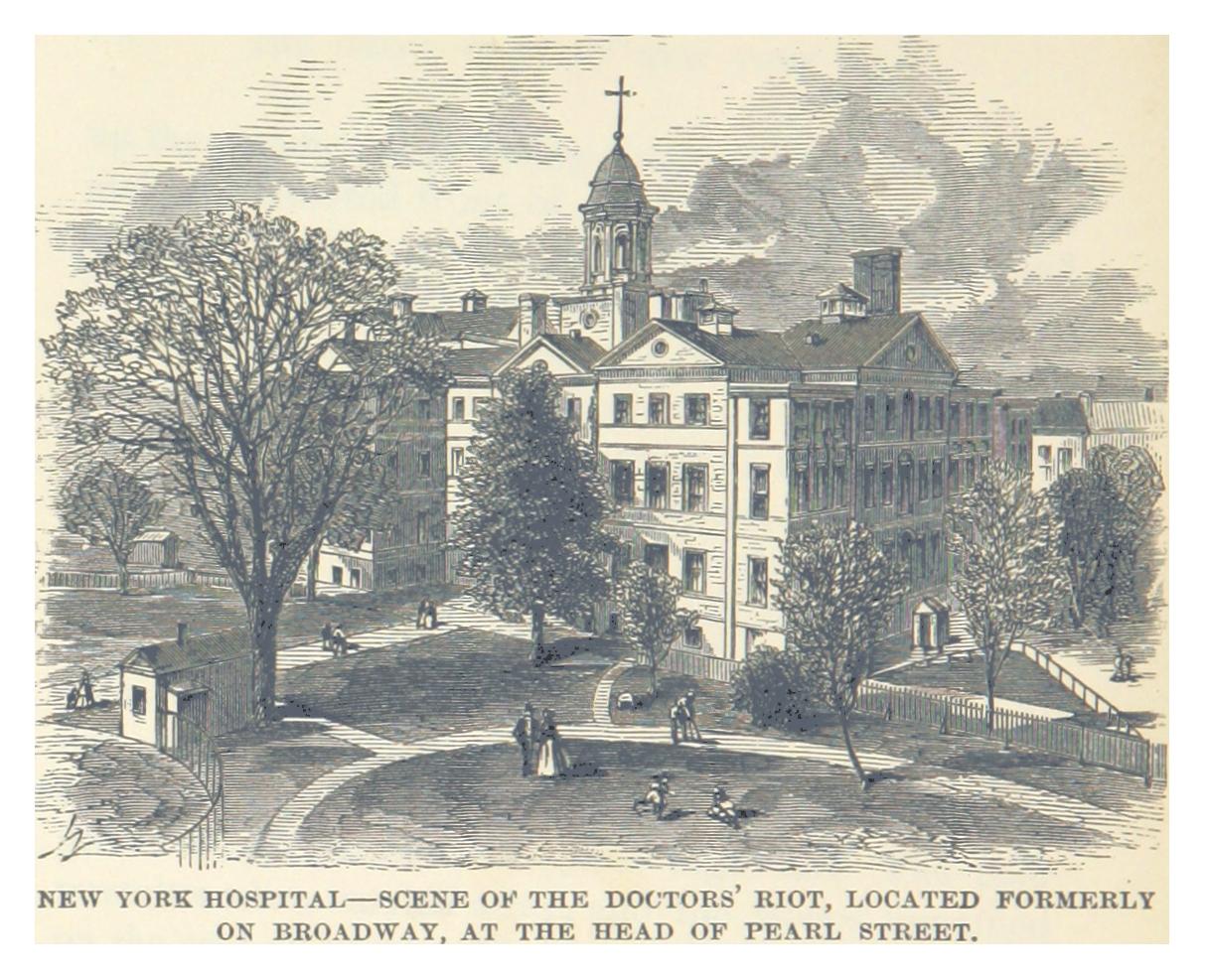
New York Hospital, scene of the riot

Because there was then no known method to preserve an entire corpse, thefts were performed hastily, often in winter to slow the rate of decomposition. In the winter of 1788, the number of corpses being exhumed by students increased substantially. The activities of medical students and physicians, who were known colloquially as "Resurrectionists" in the black cemetery, were noticed by a group of freedmen who, on February 3, petitioned the Common Council to take action against it. The petition was largely ignored, and no effort was made to stop the unlicensed exhumations.

In April 1788, a group of children were playing outside the New York Hospital, next to a room where a student of the physician Richard Bayley, who was known to exhume corpses from the two cemeteries, was dissecting an arm. Bayley, born and bred in Connecticut, had received his medical education in England, where body-snatching was more common. There were whispers about him "cutting up his patients and performing cruel experiments upon the sick."

The student, John Hicks, waved the arm out at the children, telling a boy whose mother had recently died that it belonged to her. The boy ran home and told his father of that. He, after exhuming his wife's coffin and finding it empty, gathered a group of concerned citizens who marched to the hospital and began to mass around the building.

The mob eventually broke into the hospital and, after becoming incensed upon finding several bodies in various stages of mutilation, pulled Richard Bayley's assistant Wright Post and a number of his students into the street, where the mayor of New York City, James Duane intervened and ordered them escorted to the jailhouse for protection.

A crowd of 2,000 people had gathered, and news spread of the horrors seen in the hospital, leading to widespread rioting, with the few physicians remaining in New York City being forced into hiding. A large group of rioters descended upon Broadway, searching for John Hicks, who was felt by the crowd to be the main source of blame. John Hicks was the son of prominent former mayor of New York Whitehead Hicks. As they assembled in front of the courthouse and threw rocks, militia and cavalry were called in to repel them. The riot lasted a few days, ceasing when Governor Clinton sent the militia to patrol the streets until a calm environment was ensured.

At least three rioters and three militiamen died in the confrontation; some estimate up to 20 dead. The protesters also destroyed all the available human specimens.

== Effects ==
Public opinion of physicians in New York stood very low for many years, and while some students were brought to trial, Hicks was not among them. Post-mortem dissection was considered an indignity to the dead, and the city fathers even forbade using bodies abandoned in the rougher parts of the city. A year later, in January 1789, a statute was finally put into law in order to codify the proper treatment of corpses, with harsh punishments imposed for those who violated it. Anyone who broke the law would stand on the pillory or be publicly whipped, fined, or imprisoned.

== See also ==
- List of incidents of civil unrest in New York City
- List of incidents of civil unrest in the United States
- Burke and Hare murders
