= Anatomy Act of Quebec =

1843 Quebec law for procuration of cadavers for medical schools

The Anatomy Act of Quebec allows legal procuration of unclaimed bodies from government institutions for use by medical schools in Quebec. The law was passed in 1843, then amended in 1883. Prior to its establishment, illegal cadaver trade by body-snatchers was common, including students paying their fees with bodies exhumed from cemeteries.
