= Nighthawking =

Nighttime archaeological theft

Nighthawking is a form of archaeological looting: the theft of archaeological artifacts from protected archaeological sites and areas under the cover of darkness, most commonly by members of the public with the use of a commercial metal detector. See archaeological looting and grave robbery for more details. This article describes the situation in Great Britain.

== Nighthawking and the law ==
Nighthawking breaks the law on a number of points:

1. Trespass: Nighthawking is often performed on private land where permission to survey and dig has not been given or has been refused. Any disturbance with the land or dispersal of any substance makes it aggravated trespass which is more routinely prosecuted.
2. Digging on scheduled sites: Digging on any sites which are scheduled monuments without prior consent from the Secretary of State for Culture, Media and Sport is illegal in the United Kingdom.
3. Declaration of treasure: The Treasure Act 1996 requires all finds that are legally defined as treasure to be declared to a local coroner or the police within 14 days. Nighthawkers rarely declare their finds due to the method of acquisition. Breach of this law can result in a £5,000 fine, a term of imprisonment up to three months or both.
4. Theft: In Britain, ownership of finds on private lands, unless declared treasure, rests with the land owners.

== Impact on metal detecting in the United Kingdom ==
Nighthawkers, being criminals, are distinct from law-abiding metal detectorists. Hobbyist groups as The National Council for Metal Detecting or the Federation of Independent Detectorists are not to be confused with such criminal activity. It has been claimed, but not proven, that nighthawkers use such groups as a method of obtaining information about archaeological sites.

== Prevalence ==
Nighthawking was the subject of a 2008 study undertaken by Oxford Archaeology and collectively funded by English Heritage, Cadw, Historic Scotland, National Museum, National Museum of Wales and the Portable Antiquities Scheme. The primary aim of the study "Nighthawks and Nighthawking: Damage to Archaeological Sites in the United Kingdom and Crown Dependencies caused by illegal searching and removal of antiquities", was to assess the level of damage caused by Nighthawking to British archaeological heritage and to study the adequacy of current law in dealing with Nighthawking. The review, determined an average of at least 1.5 incidents a month. Other relevant bodies associated with the study are Archaeology Guernsey, Jersey Heritage Trust, Manx National Heritage, National Museums Scotland and the Northern Ireland Environment Agency.

In the 2020s, some sources report a "nighthawking epidemic" on the rise in the UK.

== See also ==
- Operation Icarus - Police investigation into the organised theft and black market trade of religious and church artefacts in England and Wales
