= Wright Post =

American surgeon (1766–1828)

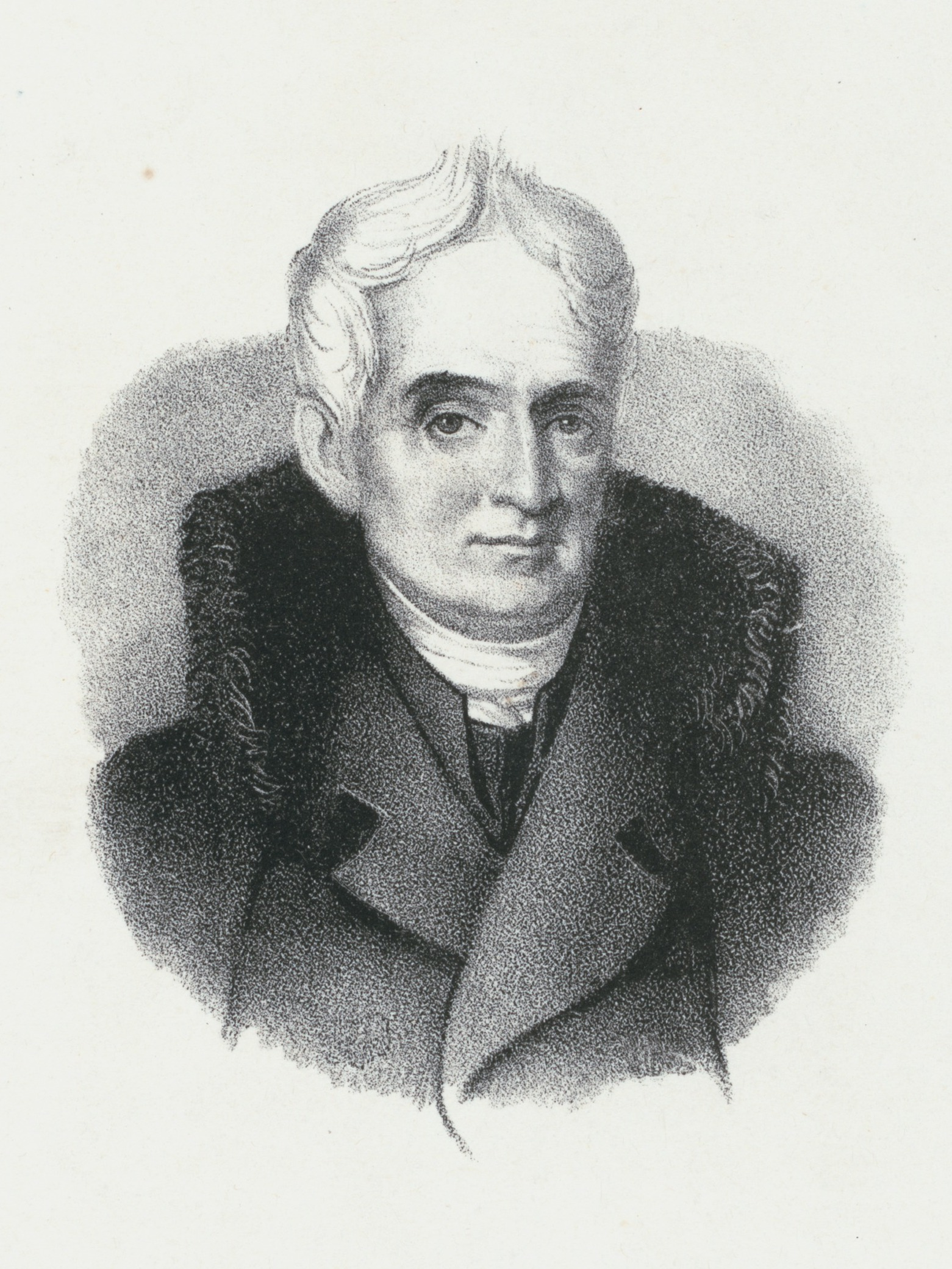
- Born: February 19, 1766; North Hempstead, New York
- Died: June 14, 1828 (aged 62); Throggs Neck, New York
- Occupation: Surgeon
- Spouse: Mary Magdalen Bayley

Wright Post (February 19, 1766 – June 14, 1828) was an American surgeon. Post was born at North Hempstead, Long Island on February 19, 1766. He studied medicine for six years in New York and London, and began to practice in New York in 1786. In London he became one of favorite pupils of the revolutionary surgeon John Hunter. During the 1788 doctor's riot, he was attacked by a mob of angry citizens, only to be saved by the intervention of mayor James Duane. In 1790, he married Mary Magdalen Bayley, daughter of Richard Bayley and sister of Elizabeth Ann Seton (later known as Mother Seton, and the first native-born citizen of the United States to be declared a saint). In 1792, he became a professor of surgery, and afterward of anatomy and physiology, in Columbia College. He visited the celebrated schools of Europe, and returned in 1793 with a splendid anatomical cabinet. In 1813 he became a professor of anatomy in the College of Physicians and Surgeons, and was its president from 1821 to 1826. Post was one of the pioneers among American surgeons, and was long remembered as a successful operator, especially in the ligation of vital arteries. He died at his home in Throggs Neck, New York on June 14, 1828.
