= Night Doctors =

Bogeymen of African American folklore

Night Doctors (also known as Night Riders, Night Witches, Ku Klux Doctors and Student Doctors) are bogeymen of African American folklore, resulting from some factual basis.

The term Night Doctor is often broadly used, referring to doctors who would illegally or unethically find means of procuring African American corpses for study during cadaver shortages – a result of southern black bodies being a valuable resource for dissection and autopsy studies in medical colleges. Multiple methods were used, the most common being graverobbing (or body snatching) of impoverished communities; other doctors would pay slave owners for the bodies of deceased slaves. For many slaves, death was thought of as the time their body would finally rest and suffer no longer. In contrast, many slave owners believed they had right to a slave's body even after death. Other Night Doctors, known as Needle Men or Black Bottle Men, would secretly poison African American patients for their cadavers after death. Stories of graverobbing, murder, and various enforced medical experimentation led to the development of African American folklore that told of doctors who would abduct, kill, and dissect bodies.

== Body snatching ==
Throughout the late 18th and early 19th centuries in the United States, the demand for cadavers exceeded the supply when hands-on dissection became popular in medical schools. The importance of human bodies in explaining general anatomy and fundamental methods like amputation has existed since ancient times. However, the need was intensified in the 19th century by the increased acceptability of dissecting human bodies. The necessity for dead bodies was met by grave-robbing and using slave bodies. The government put into place various countermeasures to deter grave robbers. However, these measures took time and money. Therefore, African American bodies were the most common ones to be robbed since they were legally, economically, and socially disadvantaged. Hence, the most frequent targets of grave robbers were African Americans, immigrants, and the impoverished. Grave robbers avoided stealing white American bodies because the dissection of white cadavers carried far greater risks for physicians. The bodies of African Americans were often sold to chattel for dissection by slave owners after their death. There is an overwhelming amount of evidence suggesting that the bodies of impoverished people, African Americans, and underprivileged individuals were used to improve the medical training of white elites. Grave robbers and their crimes were frequently overlooked by white Americans since grave robbing had no direct impact on them. The tales of night doctors, who bought and stole bodies, became part of African American history and traditions.

Body snatching increased during the post-revolutionary period because medical students started to perform dissections rather than simply observing professors. In the early 19th century, most states legislated against grave robbery. Even though grave robbing was formally prohibited, the penalty was comparatively light since grave robbing was considered misconduct rather than a felony. The punishment for grave robbing was a possible fine and a short period of imprisonment. Due to these permissive attitudes, relatives of the lately departed had to take it upon themselves to watch their loved ones' graves. Following this, grave robbery was very frequent even though there were laws prohibiting it in some states. Because of grave robbing, several riots took place between 1765 and 1852, the most well-known of which was New York Doctors' Riot of 1788. In the New York Doctors' riot of 1788, the unauthorized acquisition of bodies from the graves of the recently departed sparked a massive outburst of anger and dissatisfaction among impoverished people, specifically aimed at doctors and medical trainees. In January 1789, a year after the riot, a law was successfully passed that regulated the appropriate treatment of dead bodies, with heavy penalties inflicted on anyone who disobeyed the law. The Anatomy Act 1832, which handed unclaimed remains to scientists and eventually ended grave robbery in Britain, was instrumental in enacting legislation in the United States that curtailed grave robbing. Massachusetts passed an identical, albeit less harshly worded, Anatomy Act of 1831, which legalized the use of dead bodies for dissection and anatomical studies. Most states soon passed similar legislation, and by the turn of the century, cadavers were almost entirely sourced from unclaimed remains.

An example of a medical college that used the bodies of African Americans, immigrants, and impoverished people is the Medical College of Georgia. Excavations at the Medical College of Georgia in 1989 yielded more than 9,000 bones. No records exist, and none of the remains have been identified. However, it fits the inflammatory story to claim that they were mainly from working-class individuals and approximately 80% of those were African Americans. In addition to being the majority of cadavers, many teaching hospitals would only perform new live surgical techniques and demonstrations on African American patients. The consequences of employing the majority of African American bodies led to the dehumanization of African American people in the medical system, a lack of confidence between African American people and medical experts, and a reluctance among African American people to donate their bodies for medical purposes. The inordinate use of African American bodies for autopsy and medical studies unwittingly formed a view of black people as nothing more than medical experimentation material. The usage of African American bodies as experimental subjects has a long history in the United States, dating back to the use of Henrietta Lacks' cancer cells for research purposes without her proper consent to the Tuskegee Syphilis Study. In both of these instances, patients did not give consent to the medical projects and research being done on them. They were not informed and were blatantly misled. Medical injustice to people of color still remains, leaving a mistrust of the medical system throughout the country.

== Needle and Black Bottle Men ==
Johns Hopkins Hospital and New Orleans' Charity Hospital (now replaced by the UMCNO) are noted originators of student Night Doctor stories. Cadavers used by Johns Hopkins University were highly disproportionate (2/3 African American) to the surrounding population at the time, and Charity Hospital was known for multiple racist incidents. Many African Americans were distrusting of the hospitals, or told by older generations to avoid them. A quote from The Immortal Life of Henrietta Lacks once explained that,

You'd be surprised how many people disappeared in East Baltimore when I was a girl. I'm telling you, I lived here in the fifties when they got Henrietta, and we weren't allowed to go anywhere near Hopkins. When it got dark and we were young, we had to be on the steps, or Hopkins might get us.

Both hospitals contributed to stories of Night Doctors with specific killing habits.

The Needle Men would poke unsuspecting individuals in the arm with a poisoned needle; after death, records would be falsified to give other explanations for the victim's passing.

I sure don't go out much at this time of year. You take a chance just walkin' on the streets. Them Needle Men's is everywhere. They always come 'round in the fall, and they're 'round to about March. You see, them Needle Mens is medical students from the Charity Hospital tryin' to git your body to work on. That's 'cause stiffs are very scarce at this time of the year.

The Black Bottle Men would offer African American patients a black bottle of 'medicine,' leading to their death shortly afterwards. The bottle is now thought to have contained a mixture of cascara and milk of magnesia, which when properly administered worked as a common laxative of the period. Incorrect usage, however, could cause severe side effects.

== Modern day consequences ==
Night Doctors, as well as other systemic and racial issues in American medicine (the most notable being the Tuskegee Syphilis Study), have left many modern-day repercussions on black communities in search of medical care. Many medical studies performed on African Americans were done without their consent, leaving some today distrusting and wary of the medical system which has wronged them in the past. African American communities tend to be underfunded, with less access to health care, education, insurance, and resources; and certain African American patients, taken less seriously by medical professionals, have been denied pain medication because they are perceived to be faking or in less pain.
