= Johannes Cabal the Detective =

Novel by Jonathon L. Howard

Johannes Cabal the Detective is a 2010 supernatural fiction/dark comedic/Ruritanian romance mystery novel by Jonathan L. Howard and the second book in the Johannes Cabal series. The novel follows Cabal, an infamous necromancer on adventures in the fictional Central European countries of Mirkavia and Senza.

== Synopsis ==
The novel follows the necromancer Cabal, as he is awaiting execution as a result of a botched book theft. He's able to escape by stealing a government official's identity, but this proves to cause more trouble than he expected when he ends up getting caught up in a series of strange events on a luxury aeroship.

== Reception ==
Critical reception has been positive. NPR gave the novel a positive review, writing "You needn't have read the first book to enjoy Howard's latest pulpy adventure, but odds are, once you've experienced the author's dryly funny, dexterous prose — and seen how well it breathes life (as it were) into his unapologetically amoral main character, you'll want to seek it out." The Denver Post also praised the work, calling it a "delight" and commenting that "Howard has taken his central character and kept him true to his core, while sending him off on an adventure that could not be anticipated from "Johannes Cabal the Necromancer.""
