= Jonathan L. Howard =

British writer and game designer

Jonathan L. Howard is a British writer and game designer, known mainly for his novels about Johannes Cabal the Necromancer. He lives with his wife and daughter near Bristol.

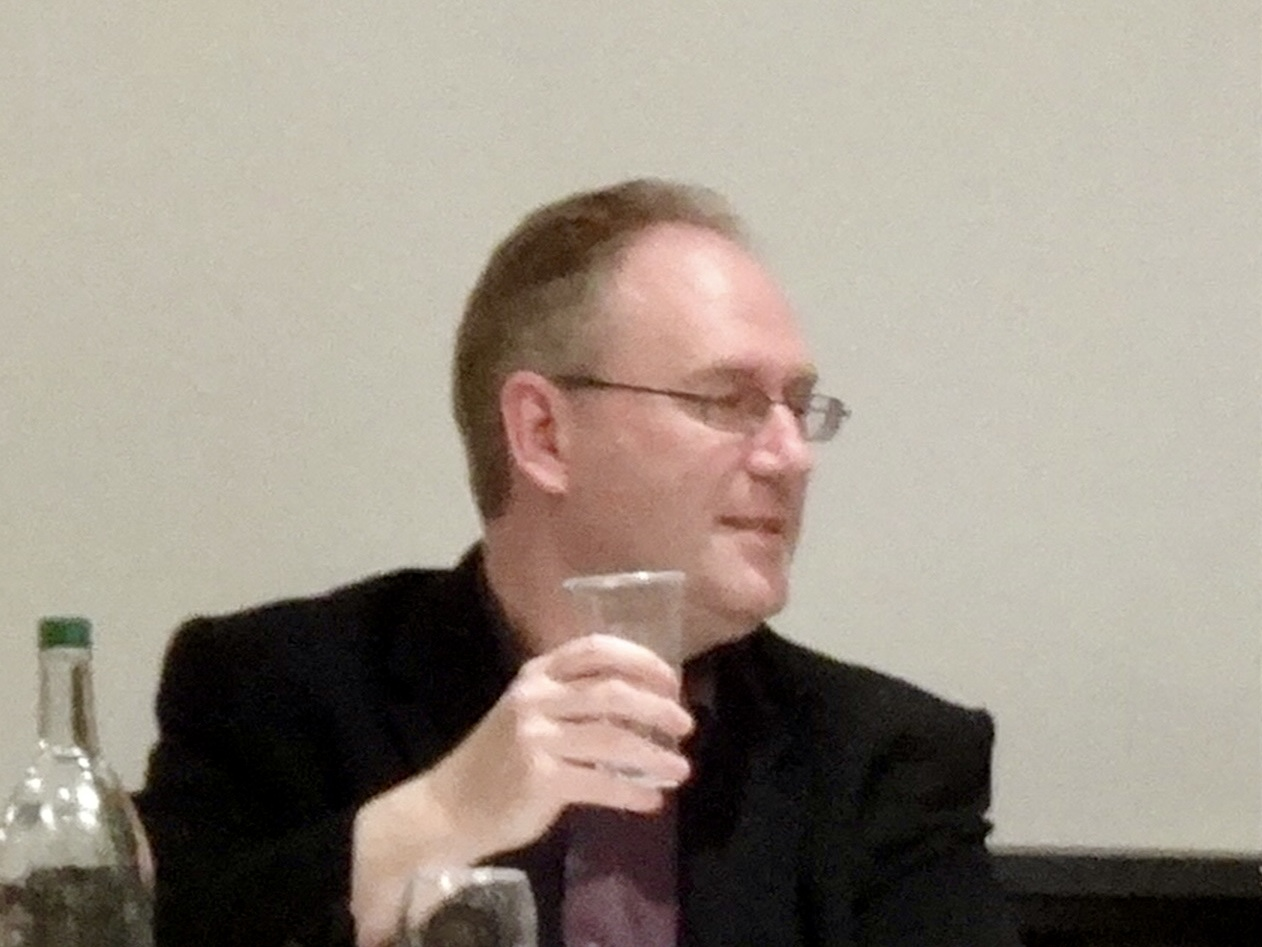
Jonathan L. Howard

== Work ==
Howard worked as scriptwriter and video game writer since the early 1990s, and co-wrote the Broken Sword series of games, among others. He came to readers' attention with his series of black comedy novels about the necromancer Johannes Cabal.

Other works include the Russalka Chronicles, a series of young adult submarine warfare science fiction novels. Set on the ocean planet Russalka, named after the mythical mermaid by its Russian colonists, they follow young civilian submariner Katya Kuriakova as she lives through a time of increasing conflict between the colonists' two main factions and the remnants of a failed Terran invasion. The first novel, Katya's World (2012) was well received by critics, with Publishers Weekly noting its "strong cast and a believable sense of danger", and io9 highlighting that, unusually for young-adult fiction, the novel featured a broad cast of competent adult supporting characters and refrained from giving the protagonist a romantic interest.

He also wrote the series "Goon Squad" an ongoing episodic story that unfolds in monthly issues. It is set in an alternate version of Manchester where the existence of “special talents”—people who possess unique powers or abilities—has been public knowledge since the 1940s. The series follows The Goon Squad, a team of special talents who work for the police to catch high-ranking criminals. The series started in January 2014, took a hiatus in 2015 and continued in January 2016. The last installment ("The End of the Year Show") was released in 2016. However, the story was left at a cliffhanger so there is the possibility of a continuation.

Howard is also a writer of the computer game Atomfall (Rebellion Developments, 2025). He wrote a related comic strip about the game which appeared in the Judge Dredd Megazine as part of the marketing of the game.

== Bibliography ==
The Johannes Cabal series

- Novels:

- Johannes Cabal the Necromancer, 2009
- Johannes Cabal the Detective, 2010
- Johannes Cabal: The Fear Institute, 2011
- The Brothers Cabal, 2014
- Johannes Cabal and the Blustery Day: And Other Tales of the Necromancer, 2015 (collection)
- The Fall of The House of Cabal, 2016

- Short fiction (included in the 2015 collection):

- "Johannes Cabal and the Blustery Day," 2004
- "Exeunt Demon King," 2006
- "The Ereshkigal Working," 2011
- "The House of Gears," 2011
- "The Death of Me," 2013
- "Ouroboros Ouzo", 2014
- "A Long Spoon", 2014

- Short story (title unknown) in the Of Shadows, Stars, and Sabers anthology (February 2025)

The Russalka Chronicles novels
- Katya's World, 2012
- Katya's War, 2013

The Goon Squad Series

- "GOON SQUAD Issue #1 "The New Girl."", 2014
- "GOON SQUAD Issue #2 "Nightclubbing"", 2014
- "GOON SQUAD Issue #3 "By the Water, By the Grave"", 2014
- "GOON SQUAD Issue #4 "Exterminating Angel"", 2014
- "GOON SQUAD Issue #5 "A Star in Strange Ways"", 2014
- "GOON SQUAD Issue #6 "Holy Fool"", 2014
- "GOON SQUAD Issue #7 "Dead Man Tells Tale"", 2014
- "GOON SQUAD "2014 Summer Special"", 2014
- "GOON SQUAD Issue #8 "Pomona Island"", 2016
- "GOON SQUAD Issue #9 "Life During Wartime"", 2016
- "GOON SQUAD Issue #10 "Shadow of the Vivisector"", 2016
- "GOON SQUAD Issue #11 "The Man from Switzerland"", 2016
- "GOON SQUAD Issue #12 "The End of the Year Show"", 2016

Carter & Lovecraft Series

- Carter & Lovecraft, 2015
- After the End of the World, 2017

Standalone novels
- The Shadow on the Glass (Call of Cthulhu), 2024

Short story collections
- Kyth the Taker, 2017
