= Assault: Retribution =

1998 video game

- North American cover art
- Developer: Candle Light Studios
- Publishers: EU: Telstar; NA: Midway Home Entertainment
- Designers: Allan Shortt; Dean Betton; Jon Egglton
- Programmers: Allan Shortt; Chris White; Duncan Chambers
- Composer: Will Davies
- Platform: PlayStation
- Release: EU: September 1998; NA: November 18, 1998
- Genre: Action
- Modes: Single-player, multiplayer

Assault, known in North America as Assault: Retribution, is a 1998 action video game developed by Candle Light Studios for the PlayStation console. It was published in North America by Midway Games and in Europe by Telstar.

== Gameplay ==
Assault: Retribution is a 3D combat shoot 'em up style game that heavily focuses on the combat. The game is set in an outer-space environment with hordes of aliens attacking the player. Players can take control of either two characters Reno or Kelly, the two soldiers sent down to protect the city of Arcadia from the aliens.

== Development ==
Assault was the sole game developed by Candle Light Studios, a development forged from a team of ex-Accolade designers who had worked on the futuristic combat sports title, Pitball. Before release the game was proclaimed a Contra killer by PSM Online. A port for Nintendo 64 was planned, but never released.

Candle Light Studios was based in Manchester, England. It consisted of a team of 8 people.

== Reception ==
Reception

Aggregate score
Aggregator	Score
GameRankings	60%

Review scores
Publication	Score
AllGame	3/5
Electronic Gaming Monthly	5.125/10
Game Informer	7.25/10
GamePro	1.5/5
GameRevolution	C+
GameSpot	4.2/10
Hyper	66%
IGN	5.5/10
PlayStation Official Magazine – UK	6/10
Official U.S. PlayStation Magazine	3/5
Tampa Bay Times	B+
Pittsburgh Post-Gazette	2/5

The game received mixed reviews according to the review aggregation website GameRankings. Craig Harris of IGN said, "It's obvious these guys watched a lot of science-fiction movies before sitting down and designing Assault. Literally, this game looks like Robocop killing Starship Troopers aliens". Peter Bartholow of GameSpot said, "While the basics may sound playable enough, Assault's problems are almost too many to list in this review."
