= Psychic assault =

Psychic assault is a term used by academic legal writers as a synonym for assault (or common assault) in order to distinguish that offence from the related crime of battery and so avoid confusion. The need for this term arises from the fact that the word assault is frequently used to refer collectively both to that offence and to battery.

The word 'psychic' is used to denote the fact that the actus reus of the offence that is correctly described as assault consists of affecting the mind of the other person (whereas battery consists of the application of force). See Psyche (psychology) for more on the psyche.
