= Johannes Cabal the Necromancer =

2009 novel by Jonathan L. Howard

- Author: Jonathan L. Howard
- Publisher: Doubleday Group
- Publication place: United States
- Pages: 304 (U.S. hardback)
- ISBN: 0-385-52808-6 (US)
- Website: www.jonathanlhoward.com/necromancer.html

Johannes Cabal the Necromancer is a 2009 supernatural fiction and black comedy novel written by Jonathan L. Howard. It is the first book of an ongoing series chronicling the ventures of Johannes Cabal, a necromancer of some little infamy.

== Summary ==
Johannes Cabal is a necromancer who has sold his soul to Satan in order to gain his abilities. His goal has always been to completely restore the dead to their previous living state, but Cabal has now found that his lack of a soul is standing in the way of his research. Bored with running Hell and dealing with bureaucracy, Satan offers Cabal a deal: if Cabal can get 100 souls, Satan will return his. However, this deal is not without its difficulties: Cabal only has one year to gather these souls, and he must run a carnival during this time as well.

== Reception ==
Critical opinion has been mixed. The Wisconsin State Journal was mixed in their opinion, as they felt that the work had some initial promise but "loses a bit of steam partway through". AudioFile praised the audiobook narration by Christopher Cazenove, who they felt "delivers a wickedly clever, macabre tale of horror and suspense."

=== Awards ===
- Alternative Realities Award at the Coventry Inspiration Book Awards (2014, won)
