= Assault and battery =

Assault and battery is the combination of two violent crimes: assault (harm or the threat of harm) and battery (physical violence). This legal distinction exists only in jurisdictions that distinguish assault as threatened violence rather than actual violence.

Assault and Battery may also refer to:

- Assault & Battery (Rose Tattoo album), a 1981 album by Rose Tattoo
  - "Assault and Battery", a song from the album
- Assault & Battery (Nuclear Assault album), a 1997 compilation album by Nuclear Assault
- "Assault and Battery", a song by Hawkwind from their 1975 album Warrior on the Edge of Time
- "Assault and Battery", a song by Howard Jones from his 1985 album Dream into Action
- "Assault and Battery", a song by Swollen Members from their 1999 album Balance (Swollen Members album)
- "Robbery, Assault and Battery", a song by Genesis from their 1976 album A Trick of the Tail
- Assault & Battery Studios, the former name of a recording facility in London

== See also ==
- Assault (disambiguation)
- Battery (disambiguation)
