= Grave robbery =

Act of uncovering a tomb or crypt to steal artifacts or personal effects

Grave robbery, tomb robbing, or tomb raiding is the act of uncovering a grave, tomb or crypt to steal commodities; the term looting is also used. It is usually perpetrated to take and profit from valuable artefacts or personal property. (Note: All three long-used terms bear their plain (natural) meaning, specifically that robbing and raiding in this context mean stealing. In English, Welsh and Scottish law "to rob"/"robbery" is limited to an intentional threat or attack against a person so as to steal - i.e. some form of assault or battery. In more common colloquial use the term "rob" is also used transitively with any type of place meaning to steal from. This means that, internationally, stealing of coffins/urns containing remains, components of these items or taking bodies from their proper, intended final resting place is also caught by the term) A related act is body snatching, a term denoting the contested or unlawful taking of a body (usually from a grave), which can be extended to the unlawful taking of organs alone.

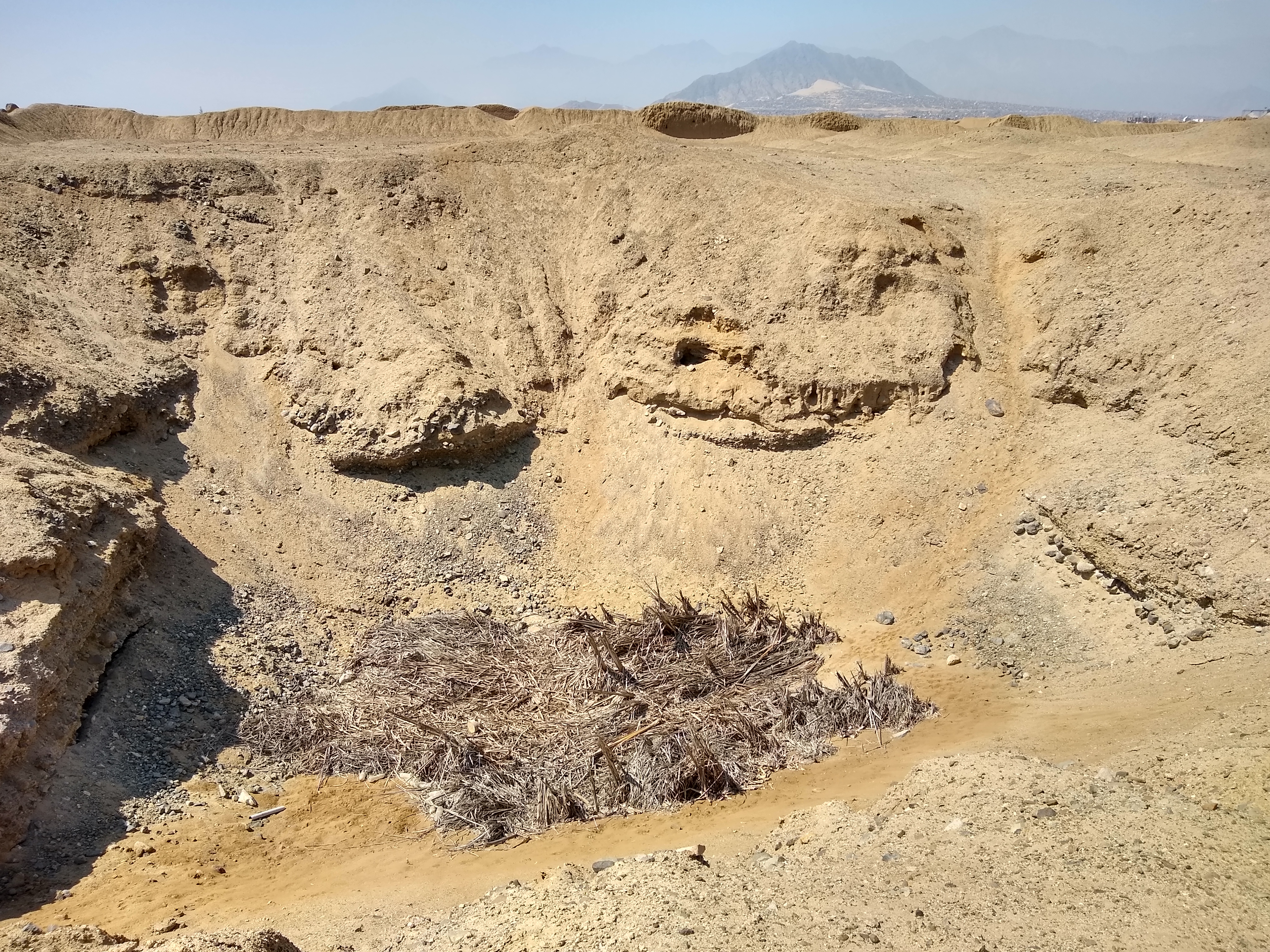
Hole that was dug by looters in Chan Chan, Peru

Grave robbing has caused great difficulty to the studies of archaeology, art history, and history. Countless precious grave sites and tombs have been robbed before scholars were able to examine them. In any way, the archaeological context and the historical and anthropological information are destroyed:

Looting obliterates the memory of the ancient world and turns its highest artistic creations into decorations, adornments on a shelf, divorced from historical context and ultimately from all meaning.

Grave robbers who are not caught usually sell relatively modern items anonymously and artifacts on the black market. Those intercepted, in a public justice domain, are inclined to deny their guilt. Though some artifacts may make their way to museums or scholars, the majority end up in private collections.

== Effects on archaeology around the world ==
=== China ===
Grave robbing in China is a practice stretching back to antiquity; the classic Chinese text Lüshi Chunqiu, dating to the 2nd century BCE, advised readers to plan simple burials to discourage looting. The presence of jade burial suits and other valuables in tombs were powerful temptations to rob graves.

In modern China, grave robbing has been perpetrated by both amateurs (such as farmers and migrant laborers) and by professional thieves associated with transnational criminal networks. The practice reached epidemic proportions in the 1980s, as the development and construction boom following the reform and opening up led to many archaeological sites being revealed. Other peaks of tomb robbing occurred in the early 2000s and in the 2010s, when the plunder of graves was on the upswing due to an increase in global and domestic demand (and prices) for Chinese antiquities. The provinces of Henan, Shaanxi, and Shanxi were particularly affected by tomb robbing.

=== Egypt ===
Ancient Egyptian tombs are one of the most common examples of tomb or grave robbery. Most of the tombs in Egypt's Valley of the Kings were robbed within one hundred years of their sealing (including the tomb of the famous King Tutankhamen, which was raided at least twice before its discovery by European archeologists in 1922). As most of the artifacts in these ancient burial sites have been discovered, it is through the conditions of the tombs and presumed articles that are missing in which historians and archaeologists are able to determine whether the tomb has been robbed. Egyptian pharaohs often kept records of the precious items in their tombs, so an inventory check is presumed for archaeologists. Oftentimes, warnings would be left by the Pharaohs in the tombs of calamities and curses that would be laid upon any who touched the treasure, or the bodies, which did little to deter grave robbers. There are many examples of grave robbing in the Ancient World outside of Egypt.

=== Classical Antiquity ===
The Romans (Byzantium) also suffered decades of theft and destruction of tombs, crypts, and graves.

=== Europe ===
In parts of Europe, graves are robbed on an accelerating scale. Many grave robbers work with metal detectors and some of the groups are organised criminals, feeding the black market with highly prized archaeological artifacts.

Merovingian graves in France and Germany and Anglo-Saxon graves in England contain many metal grave goods, mostly of iron. Grave robbers often leave them, being only interested in gold and silver. Grave contexts, ceramics, iron weapons and skeletons are typically destroyed in the process.

In Eastern Europe, including Southeast Europe and the European part of Russia, grave robbers target all kinds of historically important graves, from prehistoric tombs to World War II graves.

=== North America ===
Modern grave robbing in North America also involves long-abandoned or forgotten private Antebellum Period to pre-Great Depression era grave sites. These sites are often desecrated by grave robbers in search of old and valuable jewellery. Affected sites are typically in rural, forested areas where once-prominent, wealthy landowners and their families were interred. The remote and often undocumented locations of defunct private cemeteries make them particularly susceptible to grave robbery. The practice may be encouraged by default upon the discovery of a previously unknown family cemetery by a new landowner.

One notable historical incident occurred during the evening of November 7, 1876, when a group of counterfeiters attempted to steal Abraham Lincoln's body from his grave in Springfield, Illinois, in an attempt to secure the release of their imprisoned leader, counterfeit engraver Benjamin Boyd. However, a Secret Service agent was present and had notified the police beforehand, so the grave robbers only succeeded in dislodging the lid of his coffin. As a consequence, when Lincoln was reburied, additional security measures were implemented to prevent further grave robbery attempts.

=== Central America ===
Grave robbers often sold stolen Aztec or Mayan goods on the black market for an extremely high price. The buyers (museum curators, historians, etc.) didn't often suffer the repercussions of being in possession of stolen goods; the blame (and charges) were placed upon the lower-class grave robbers. Today's antiquities trade has become a streamlined industry, the speed at which these artifacts enter the market has grown compared to pre-internet times. Laws to prevent grave robbing have been enacted in these regions, but due to extreme poverty, these grave robberies continue to grow each year.

== Against minority populations ==
=== African Americans ===
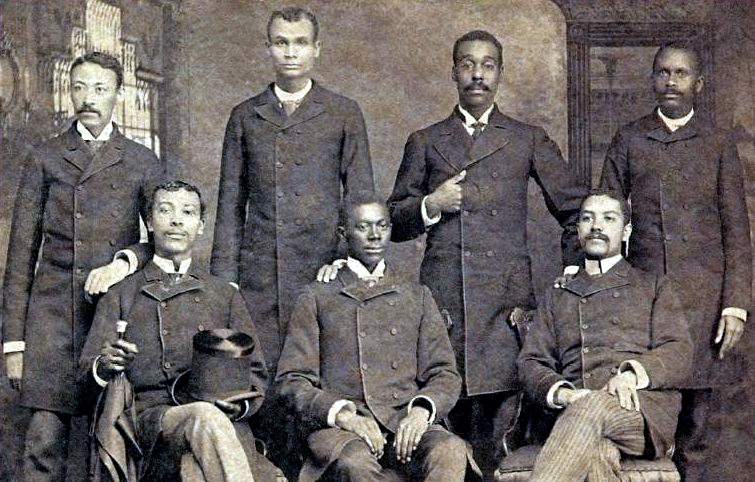
Leonard Medical School Graduating Class of 1889

During the 1800s, African Americans in the United States would often be compelled to bury their dead in a potter's field, not having the access or money for a proper funeral. When buried in potter's fields, the dead were not normally buried very deeply. A grave robber could wait discreetly in the distance until nobody else was in sight, then quickly and easily disinter the body from its shallow resting place.

Once the railroad was invented and tracks laid, the sale of the bodies of African American slaves from the South for dissection began in earnest. The bodies were robbed from graves by night doctors and shipped to medical schools in the northern part of the United States. One New England anatomy professor reported that, in the 1880s and 1890s, he entered into an arrangement in which he received, twice each semester, a shipment of 12 bodies of southern African Americans. "They came in barrels labeled [as containing] turpentine and were shipped to a local hardware store that dealt in painting materials".

State laws in Mississippi and North Carolina were passed in the 19th century which allowed medical schools to use the remains of those at the bottom of society's hierarchy—the unclaimed bodies of poor persons and residents of almshouses, and those buried in potter's fields for anatomical study. The option to dissect Confederate soldiers was also available, as Mississippi and North Carolina legally released those bodies to the families of the deceased. The North Carolina law also provided that the bodies of whites never be sent to an African American medical college (such as the Leonard Medical School). These African American medical schools typically obtained unclaimed Black ‘‘potter’s field bodies’’.

=== Indigenous Australians ===
The practice of grave robbery against Aboriginal Australians can be traced back to the early days of British colonisation, when Aboriginal burial sites were viewed merely as sites of scientific curiosity and anthropological study, and sought to collect and study their remains before they disappeared altogether.

This belief was reflected in the work of anthropologists and scientists who travelled to Australia in the nineteenth and twentieth centuries to collect Aboriginal remains for study. These remains were not only taken without the consent of Indigenous communities but were used to advance racist and pseudoscientific theories about their supposed inferiority.

It was a common practice carried out by medical students who needed corpses for dissection and research. This practice continued until the late nineteenth century when laws were introduced to regulate the supply of cadavers for medical research.

This was all part of a broader pattern of colonial violence against Indigenous Australians, which included forced removal from their land, massacres, and the forced assimilation of Indigenous children into white Australian society.

One of the most notorious examples of grave robbery in Australia is the case of the Tasmanian Aboriginals (see also: Black War). After the last full-blooded Tasmanian Aboriginal woman died in 1876, her body was exhumed and her skeleton sent to the Royal College of Surgeons in London for study. It was not until 1976, a century later, that her remains were finally returned to Australia for a proper burial.

Probably the most prolific documented individual pillager of Indigenous burial sites was George Murray Black, who ransacked around 1,800 graves around Victoria, eastern South Australia and southern New South Wales.

The practice continued well into the twentieth century, with some cases reported as recently as the 1970s. The theft and desecration of Aboriginal burial sites and remains has had profound and ongoing impacts on Indigenous communities in Australia. For many Indigenous Australians, the loss of their ancestors' remains has denied them the opportunity to mourn and grieve their loved ones. It has also perpetuated a legacy of trauma and dispossession that has been passed down through the generations.

Efforts to repatriate stolen Indigenous remains and protect Indigenous burial sites have been ongoing in Australia for many years. In recent years, there has been a growing movement to return stolen remains to their traditional owners for proper burial and commemoration.

== Deterrents ==
=== Geography ===
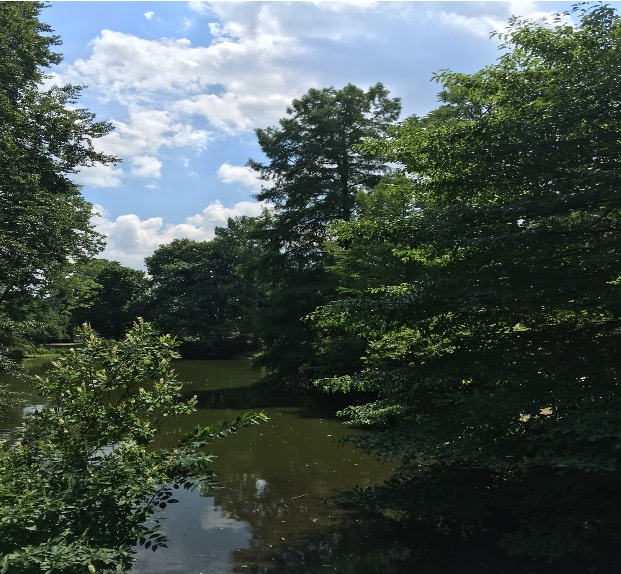
Examples of the terrain within Mount Auburn Cemetery

The geography and placement of burial grounds became a deterrent within itself. This is partly because without the accessibility of the automobile (in the early 19th century), the transportation of bodies was difficult.

An example of this is Mount Auburn Cemetery, in Cambridge Massachusetts. It was the first rural cemetery inside the United States. The rural location of the cemetery created transportation issues. In addition, the terrain of and around the area was formidable, as the designer, Henry Alexander Scammell Dearborn, wanted to leave the natural terrain (including ponds and hills) within the cemetery. If someone wanted to rob a grave, they would have to maneuver around these obstacles and navigate large stretches of land in the dark. Note that Mount Auburn Cemetery is over 175 acres (71 ha). Other cemeteries, of the time, that were originally built away from populated areas for similar reasons, include: Mount Hope Cemetery in Bangor, Maine (1834); Laurel Hill Cemetery in Philadelphia, Pennsylvania (1836); Mount Pleasant Cemetery in Taunton, Massachusetts (1836); Mount Hope Cemetery in Rochester, New York (1838); Green-Wood Cemetery in Brooklyn, New York (1838); and, Green Mount Cemetery in Baltimore, Maryland (1838).

=== Mortsafes ===
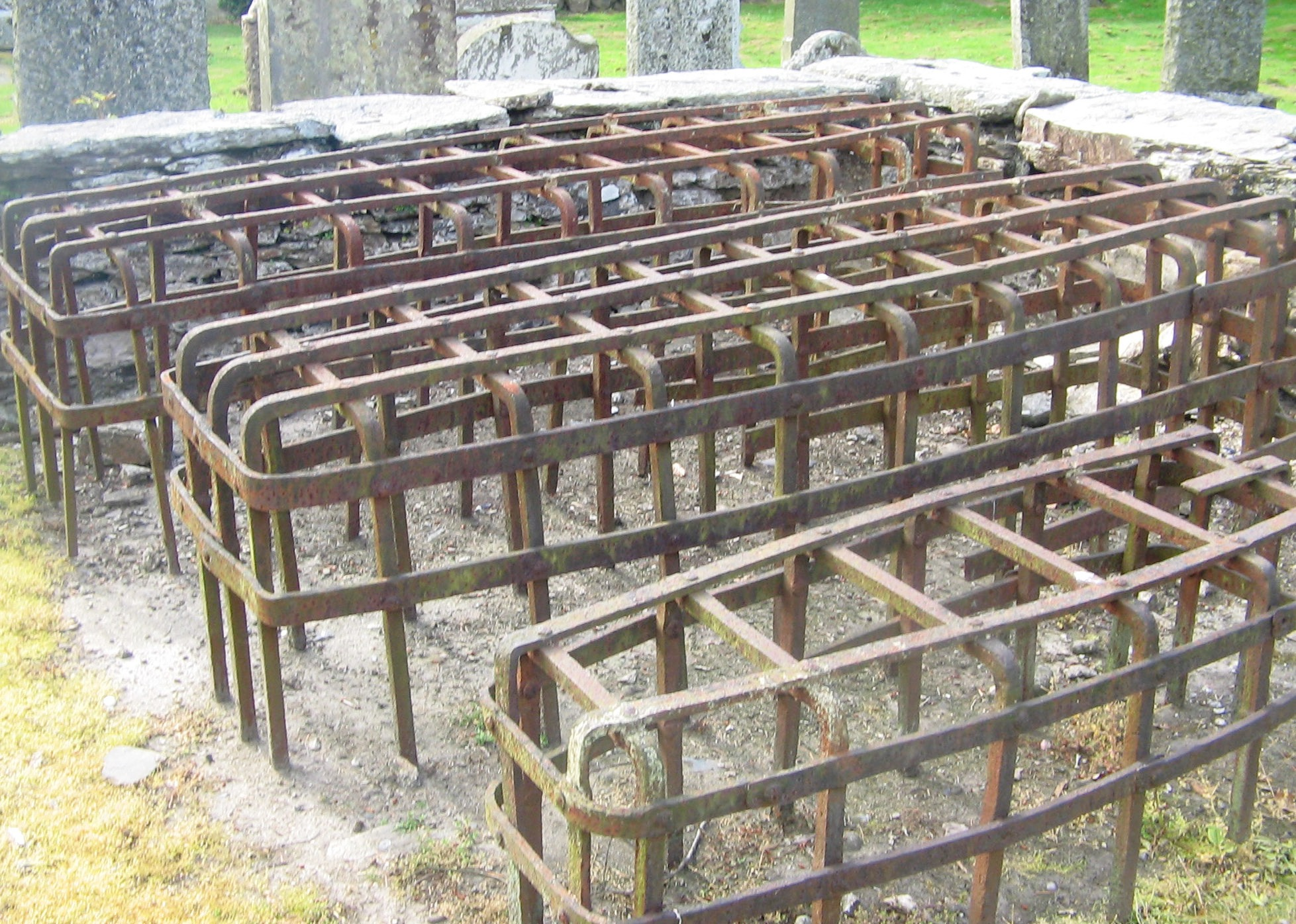
Mortsafes at Logeriat Church in Perthshire, Scotland

A mortsafe or mort safe was an iron coffin or framework which helped to protect a grave by preventing the body from being dug up and taken away. Mortsafes were specific for the task of preventing bodies from being stolen for purposes of medical dissections. Other variants included movable stone slabs capable of being hoisted over the fresh grave. All work on the principle of greatly increasing the required time for criminals to access the grave.

These deterrents, used commonly in Scotland, would be rented from the sexton until the body decomposed and were used on a circulating basis. At the passage of the Dissections Act the purpose became redundant and they were left where last used, sometimes being incorporated into the grave marker by addition of inscription.

=== Mort houses ===
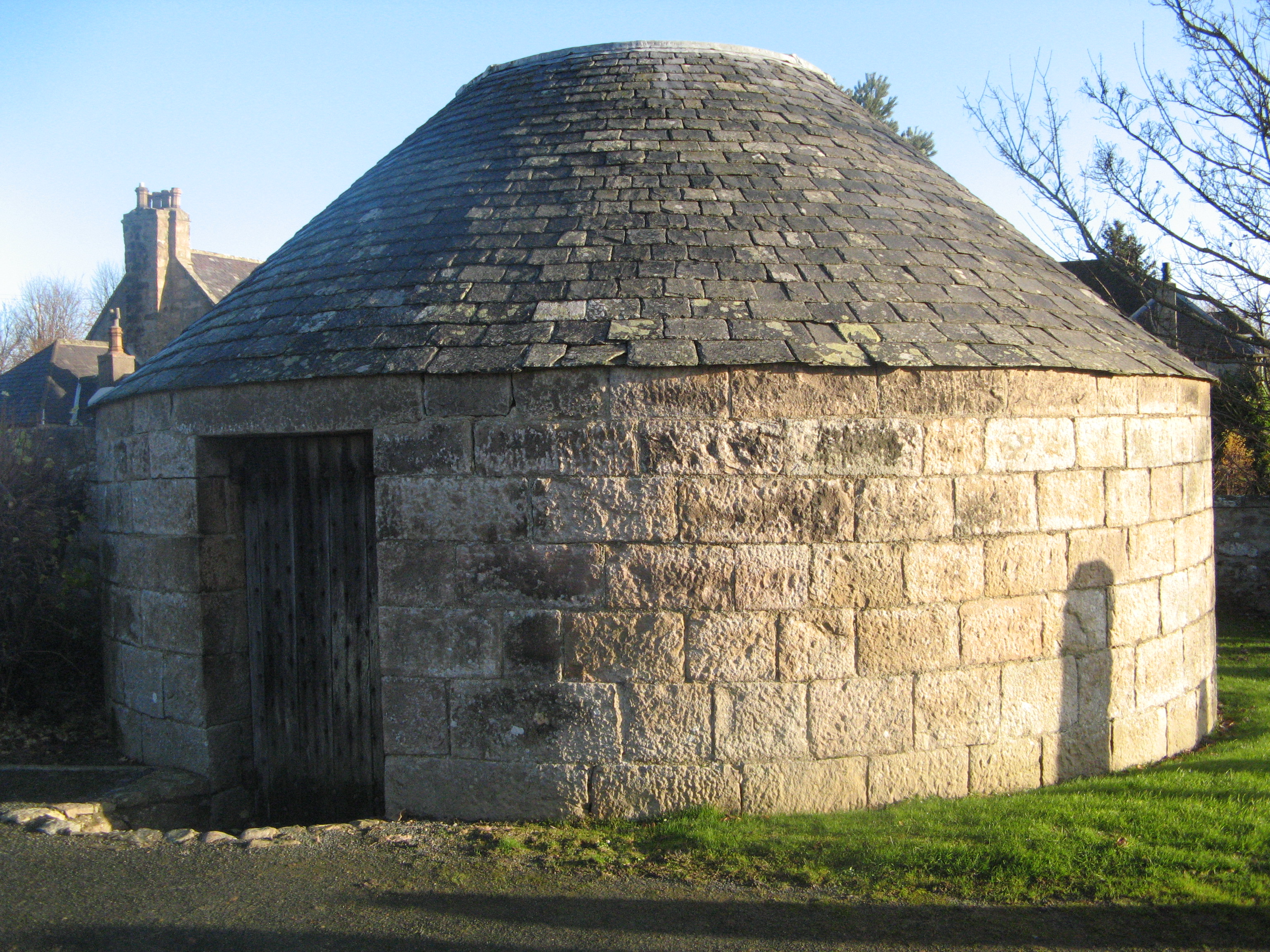
Udny Mort House in Aberdeenshire, north-east Scotland

A mort house, ossuaries or dead house was used to store bones (usually skulls and femurs) gleaned from graves a year or two after burial. They are common throughout northern Europe. They usually predate any graverobbing periods and indeed serve no purpose in relation to graverobbing as they stored bones not bodies.

Up to 31 recorded mort houses were scattered throughout Scotland and northern England. Usually these structures were built within or near cemeteries to make transportation easier. Prior to grave robbers, they were used to store dead bodies in the winter, being that the ground was too cold and in some cases impossible to dig into. An example is the Udny Mort House built in 1832, Aberdeenshire, north-east Scotland and still standing today.

=== Coffin collars ===
The coffin collar was an iron collar often fixed to a piece of wood. It was fixed around the neck of a corpse and then bolted to the bottom of a coffin. Most common reports of these collars being used came from Scotland around the 1820s.

=== Family mausoleums ===
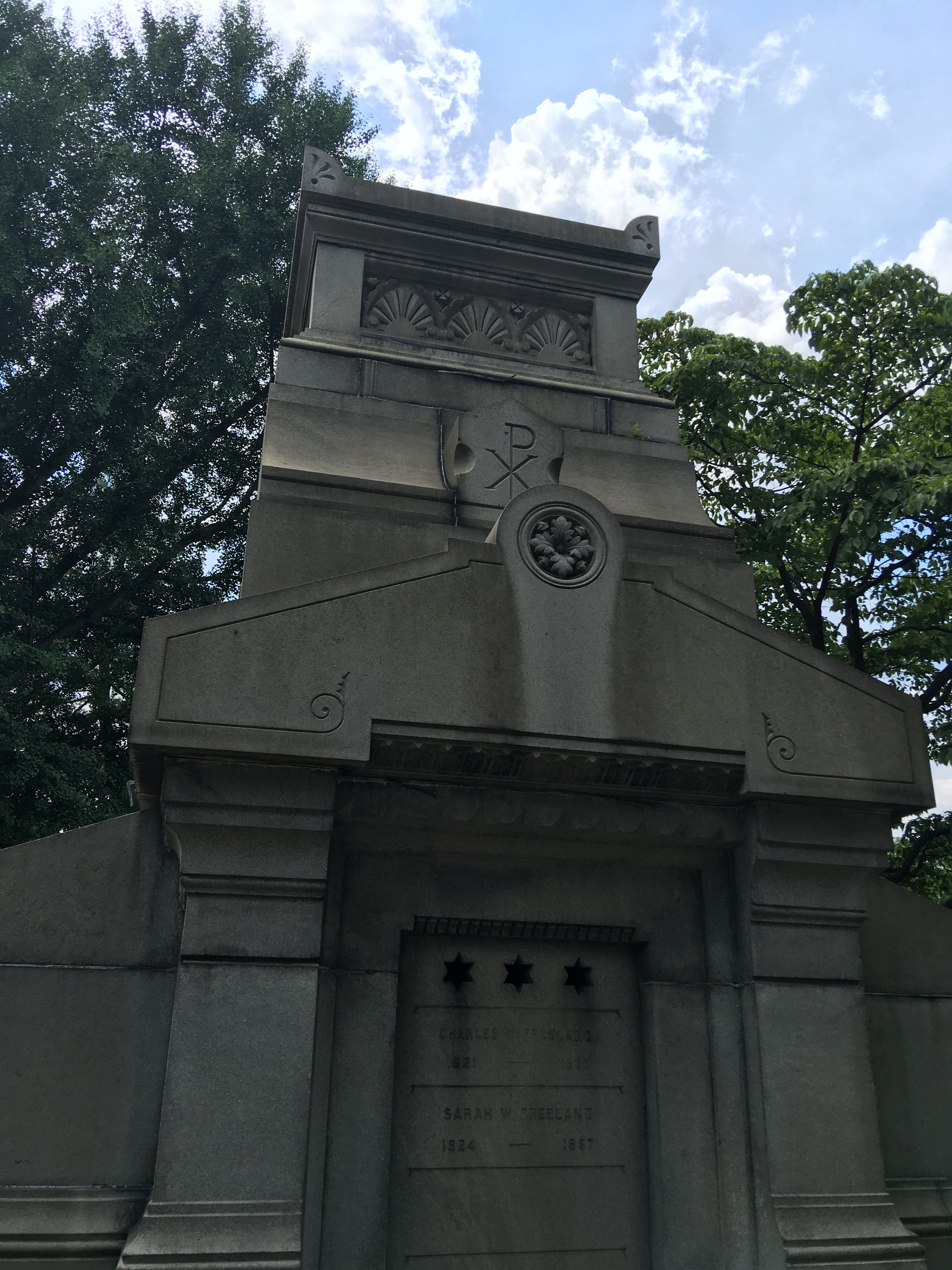
The Freeland Mausoleum at Mount Auburn Cemetery in Cambridge, Massachusetts

Mausolea do not play a major role in the history of graverobbing and are largely built as a display of wealth rather than security.

Historically mausoleums have been used as a sign of a family's wealth and a symbol of gentry and nobility in many countries. In the mid and late 19th century in North America, more and more families began to buy mausoleums. The belief was that it would be easier for a Resurrectionist or grave robber to dig up a grave rather than to topple down iron or steel doors guarding the mausoleum. A flaw in the design of the mausoleum was the stained glass or other windows within. Almost every family between the 18th and 19th century had a religious affiliation. Many of these families (usually with a Christian affiliation) would put stained glass within the mausoleums. The grave robbers would then just have to smash the glass to break in and to retrieve the body. Making it even easier, around the 1830s families began to fear burying family members alive. To remedy this, families would put a spare key somewhere within the mausoleum and create doors with two way locks. Grave robbers could break a window, recover the body, find the key, and walk straight out the front door of the mausoleum.

=== Cemetery vaults ===
Unlike mausolea, cemetery vaults did play a functional role in protection against graverobbing. These feature strongly in French and British layouts. Typically these would be a semi-enclosed stone structure with an ornamental cast iron access gate and usually plainer rails to the roof or sides.

Although the protective function of the vaults became redundant by 1840 most mid 19th century cemeteries continue to include vaults as a visual focal point in their layouts. This is often a critical point within overall composition.

=== Guards and guarding ===
One of the most simplistic and low-tech methods to prevent grave robbing was to have an individual guard over the newly buried body. This was done until decomposition of the body was brought to a point where they would no longer be desirable for medical use. If families did not have enough money to hire an individual to watch over the grave for a select number of days, the family would delegate this duty amongst them and close friends. As grave robbing became a lucrative business in the 19th century, a bribe would convince some guards to look the other way.

In Scotland, construction of guard towers became common in the late 18th century, usually in a position overlooking most of the burial ground.

=== Deception ===
Within the Great Pyramid of Giza (completed around 2560 BC), an Egyptian deterrent system was built to guard the tomb of Pharaoh Khufu. This system consists of blocks and grooves to protect the King's Chamber from tomb robbers. Some experts believe that Pharaoh Khufu's tomb has actually not been found because of the deterrent system; instead, what had been found by grave robbers were fake chambers.

== See also ==
- Body snatching
- Nighthawking
- Speyer wine bottle
- Tomb of Lepejou
- Treasure hunting

== Notes and references ==
Notes

== Bibliography ==
- Atwood, Roger (2004), Stealing History, Tomb Raiders, Smugglers, and the Looting of the Ancient World, New York City: St. Martin's Press
- Daniel, Glyn (1950), A Hundred and Fifty Years of Archaeology, Cambridge, Massachusetts: Harvard University Press
- Gardiner, Alan (2007) [1961], The Egyptians: An Introduction, Oxford: Oxford University Press (The Folio Society)
- Peters, Bernard C. (1997), "Indian-Grave Robbing at Sault Ste. Marie, 1826.", The Michigan Historical Review, vol. 23, no. 2
- Shelton, Jo-Ann (1998), As the Romans Did (2nd ed.), Oxford: Oxford University Press
- Craughwell, Thomas (2007), Stealing Lincoln's Body, Cambridge, Massachusetts: Harvard University Press
- Peet, T. E. (1930), The great Tomb-Robberies of the Twentieth Egyptian Dynasty, Oxford.
- Redman, Samuel (2016), Bone Rooms: From Scientific Racism to Human Prehistory in Museums, Cambridge, Massachusetts: Harvard University Press
- Lennox, Suzie (2016-09-30), Bodysnatchers: Digging Up The Untold Stories of Britain's Resurrection Men, Barnsley, South Yorkshire: Pen and Sword History, p. 39,65, ISBN 9781473866577
