= Midwifery =

Pregnancy and childbirth-related profession

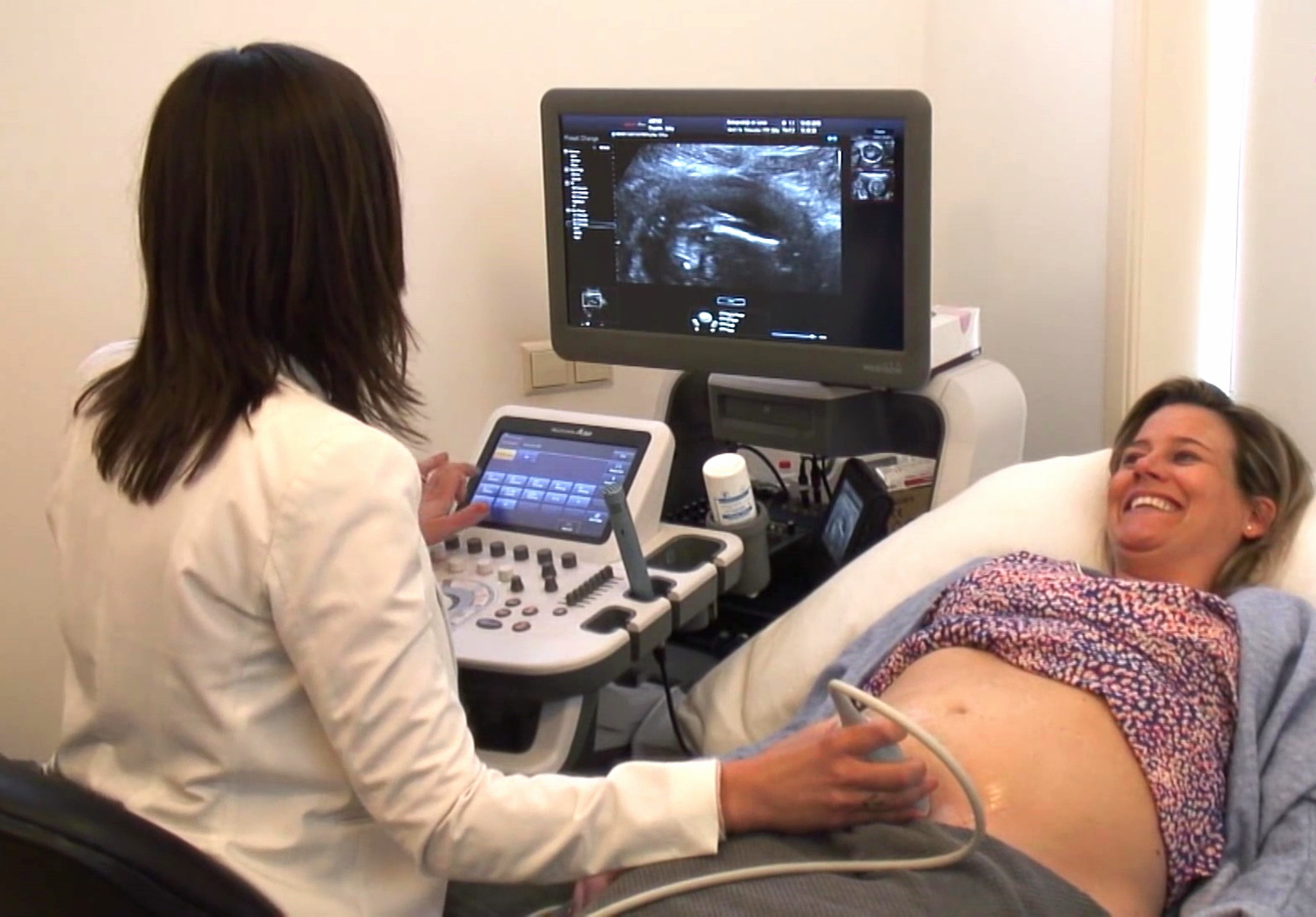
- A pregnancy check-up by a midwife in a birth center
- Focus: Pregnancy; Childbirth; Postpartum; Newborn care; Women's health; Reproductive health
- Specialist: Midwife

Midwifery is the health science and health profession that deals with pregnancy, childbirth, and the postpartum period (including care of the newborn), in addition to the sexual and reproductive health of women throughout their lives. In many countries, midwifery is a medical profession (special for its independent and direct specialized education; should not be confused with the medical specialty, which depends on a previous general training). A professional in midwifery is known as a midwife.

A 2015 Cochrane review concluded that "most women should be offered midwifery-led continuity models of care and women should be encouraged to ask for this option although caution should be exercised in applying this advice to women with substantial medical or obstetric complications." The review found that midwifery-led care was associated with a reduction in the use of epidurals, with fewer episiotomies or instrumental births, and a decreased risk of losing the baby before 24 weeks' gestation. However, midwifery-led care was also associated with a longer mean length of labor as measured in hours.

== Midwifery-led continuity of care ==
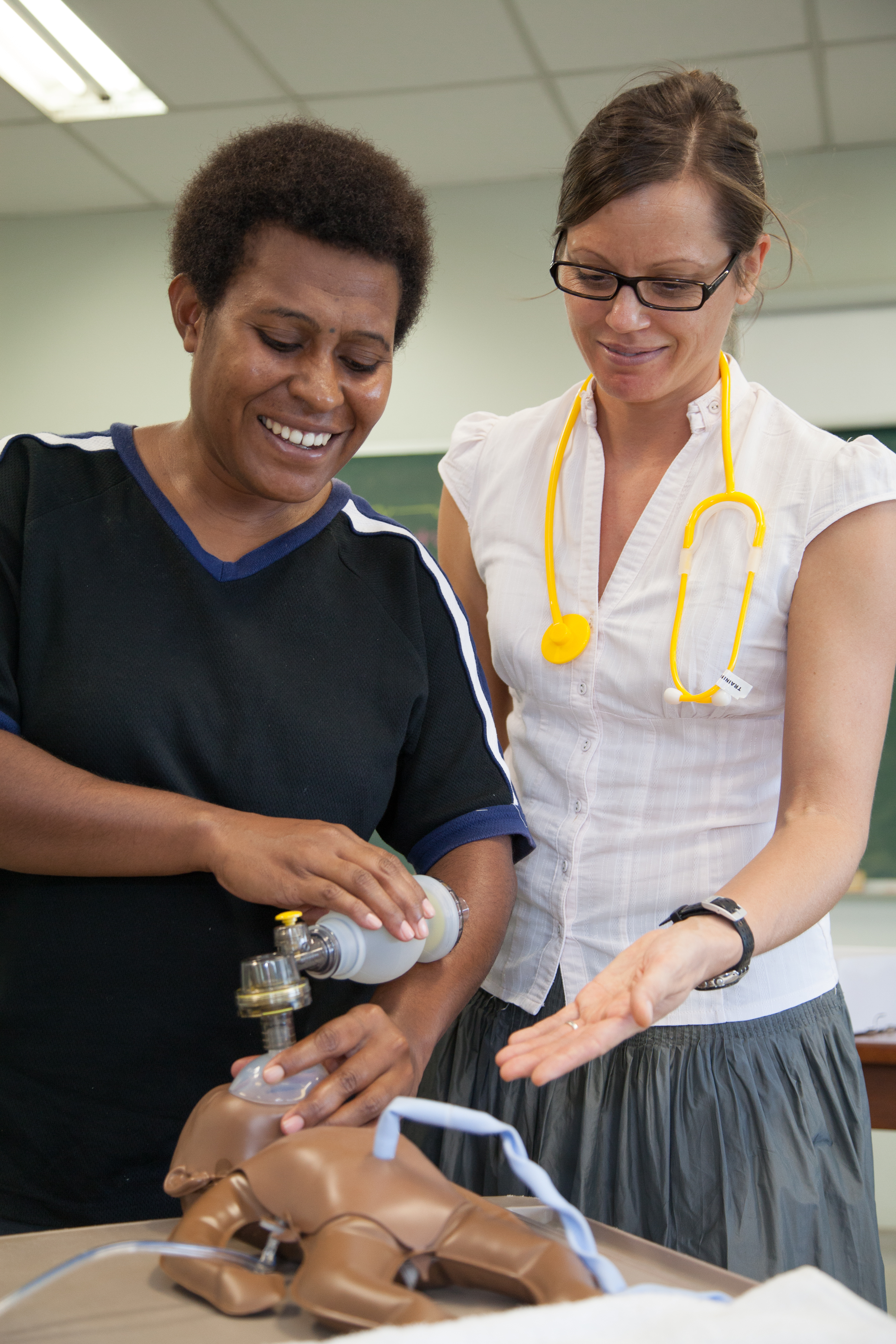
Clinical midwifery facilitator training midwives

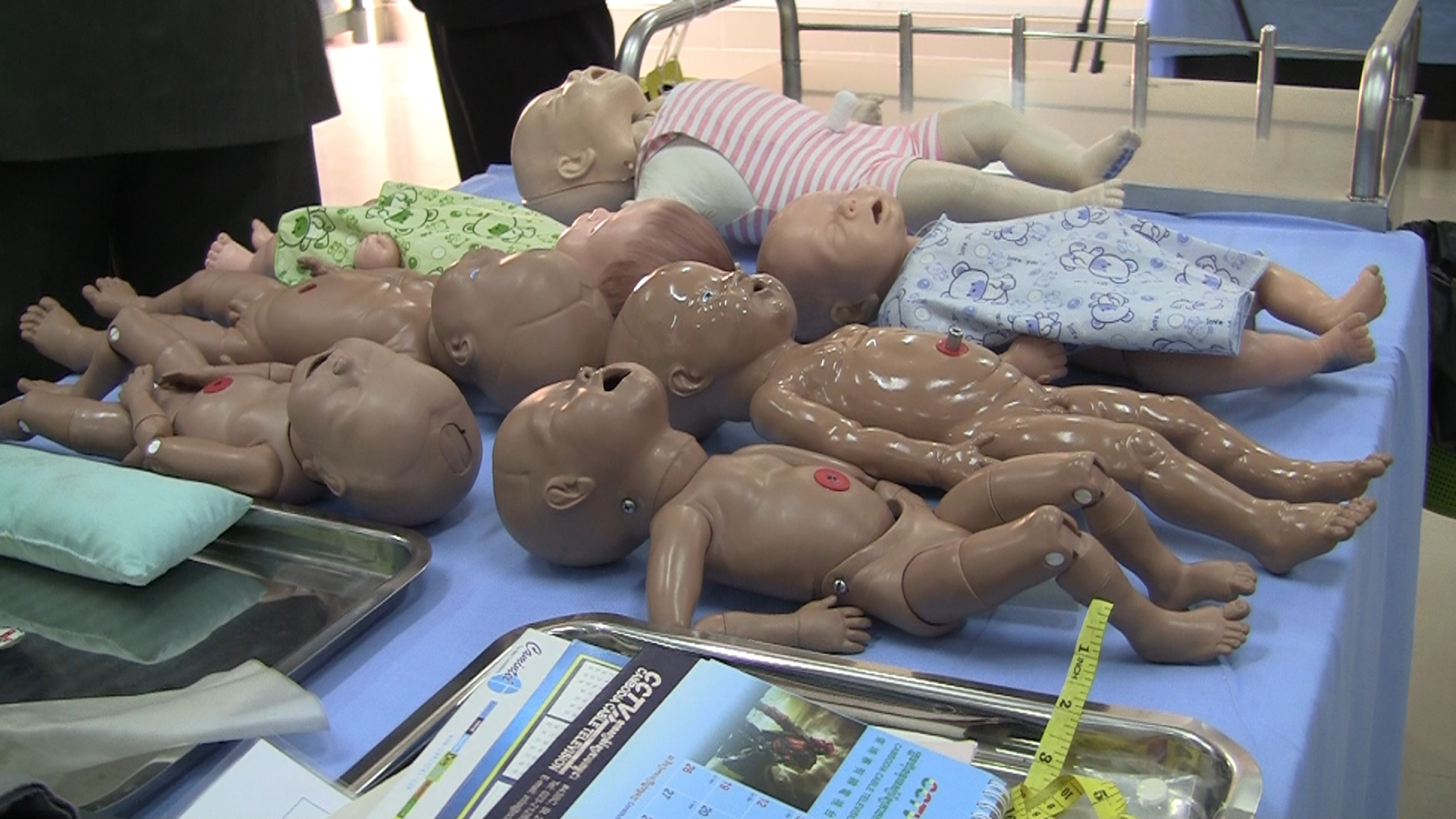
"Babies" for student practice

Midwifery-led continuity of care is where one or more midwives have the primary responsibility for the continuity of care for childbearing women, with a multidisciplinary network of consultation and referral with other health care providers. This is different from "medical-led care" where an obstetrician or family physician is primarily responsible. In "shared-care" models, responsibility may be shared between a midwife, an obstetrician and/or a family physician. The midwife is part of very intimate situations with the mother. For this reason, many say that the most important thing to look for in a midwife is comfort with them, as one will go to them with every question or problem.

According to a Cochrane review of public health systems in Australia, Canada, Ireland, New Zealand and the United Kingdom, "most women should be offered midwifery-led continuity models of care and women should be encouraged to ask for this option although caution should be exercised in applying this advice to women with substantial medical or obstetric complications." Midwifery-led care has effects including the following:

- a reduction in the use of epidurals, with fewer episiotomies or instrumental births.
- a longer mean length of labour as measured in hours
- increased chances of being cared for in labour by a midwife known by the childbearing woman
- increased chances of having a spontaneous vaginal birth
- decreased risk of preterm birth
- decreased risk of losing the baby before 24 weeks' gestation, although there appears to be no differences in the risk of losing the baby after 24 weeks or overall

There was no difference in the number of Caesarean sections. All trials in the Cochrane review included licensed midwives, and none included lay or traditional midwives. Also, no trial included out of hospital birth.

Compared to women in other care models, women in continuity models of midwifery care are more satisfied with their care. The updated version of the Cochrane review also shows a cost-saving effect in continuity models, compared to other midwifery models of care.

In continuity models of midwifery care, the midwife-woman relationship is developing over time. The deepened relationship has shown to be of great importance and is in a systematic review described as "the vehicle through which personalised care, trust and empowerment are achieved in the continuity of care midwifery model".

In some cultures, midwifery is the most traditional way of carrying out a pregnancy and childbirth, and it has been conducted for multiple generations. Child birthing women in these cultures, take Zimbabwe for example, feel that health facilities are not as comforting as cultural roots of care. Also, according to the World Health Organization, women should be able to have their children where ever they feel the most safe, so if having a midwife and proceeding with an at-home birth is what makes some women feel safe, then midwifery-led continuity of care might be the best option for them.

== History ==
=== Ancient history ===
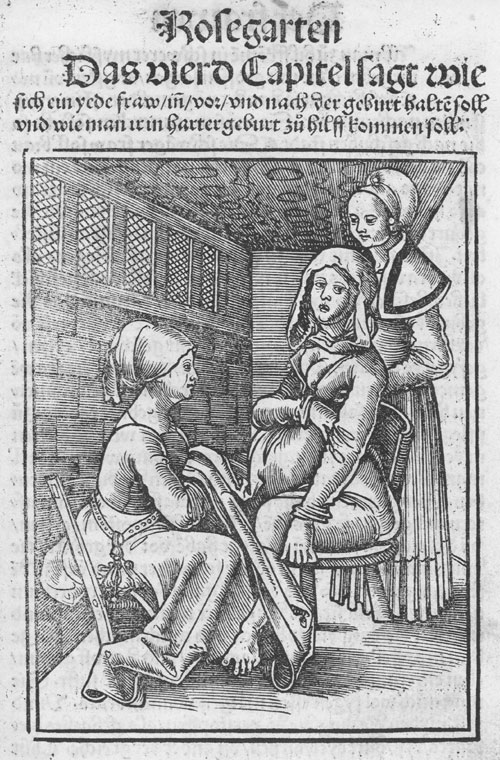
A woman giving birth on a birth chair, from a work by German physician Eucharius Rößlin

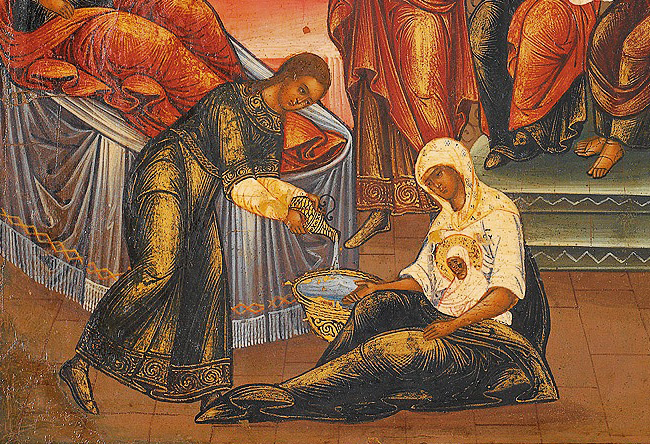
Icon Birth of Mary (detail). Russia, 17th century

In ancient Egypt, midwifery was a recognized female occupation, as attested by the Ebers Papyrus which dates from 1900 to 1550 BCE. Five columns of this papyrus deal with obstetrics and gynecology, especially concerning the acceleration of parturition (the action or process of giving birth to offspring) and the birth prognosis of the newborn. The Westcar papyrus, dated to 1700 BCE, includes instructions for calculating the expected date of confinement and describes different styles of birth chairs. Bas reliefs in the royal birth rooms at Luxor and other temples also attest to the heavy presence of midwifery in this culture.

Midwifery in Greco-Roman antiquity covered a wide range of women, including old women who continued folk medical traditions in the villages of the Roman Empire, trained midwives who garnered their knowledge from a variety of sources, and highly trained women who were considered physicians. However, there were certain characteristics desired in a "good" midwife, as described by the physician Soranus of Ephesus in the 2nd century. He states in his work, Gynecology, that "a suitable person will be literate, with her wits about her, possessed of a good memory, loving work, respectable and generally not unduly handicapped as regards her senses [i.e., sight, smell, hearing], sound of limb, robust, and, according to some people, endowed with long slim fingers and short nails at her fingertips." Soranus also recommends that the midwife be of sympathetic disposition (although she need not have borne a child herself) and that she keep her hands soft for the comfort of both mother and child. Pliny, another physician from this time, valued nobility and a quiet and inconspicuous disposition in a midwife. There appears to have been three "grades" of midwives present: The first was technically proficient; the second may have read some of the texts on obstetrics and gynecology; but the third was highly trained and reasonably considered a medical specialist with a concentration in midwifery.

Agnodice or Agnodike (Gr. Ἀγνοδίκη) was the earliest historical, and likely apocryphal, midwife mentioned among the ancient Greeks.

Midwives were known by many different titles in antiquity, ranging from iatrinē (Gr. nurse), maia (Gr., midwife), obstetrix (Lat., obstetrician), and medica (Lat., doctor). It appears as though midwifery was treated differently in the Eastern end of the Mediterranean basin as opposed to the West. In the East, some women advanced beyond the profession of midwife (maia) to that of gynaecologist (iatros gynaikeios, translated as women's doctor), for which formal training was required. Also, there were some gynecological tracts circulating in the medical and educated circles of the East that were written by women with Greek names, although these women were few in number. Based on these facts, it would appear that midwifery in the East was a respectable profession in which respectable women could earn their livelihoods and enough esteem to publish works read and cited by male physicians. In fact, a number of Roman legal provisions strongly suggest that midwives enjoyed status and remuneration comparable to that of male doctors. One example of such a midwife is Salpe of Lemnos, who wrote on women's diseases and was mentioned several times in the works of Pliny.

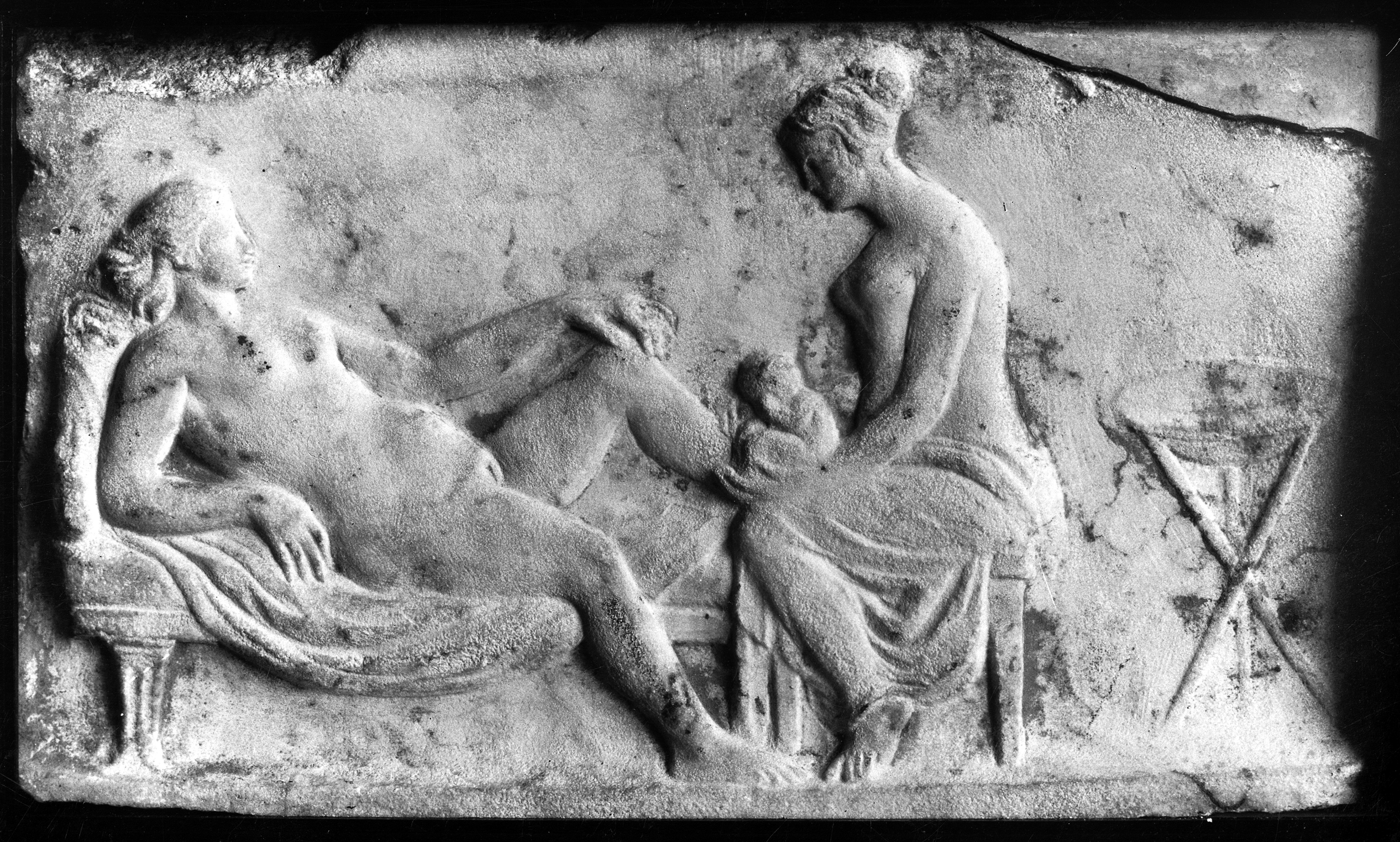
Ancient Roman relief carving of a midwife

However, in the Roman West, information about practicing midwives comes mainly from funerary epitaphs. Two hypotheses are suggested by looking at a small sample of these epitaphs. The first is the midwifery was not a profession to which freeborn women of families that had enjoyed free status of several generations were attracted; therefore it seems that most midwives were of servile origin. Second, since most of these funeral epitaphs describe the women as freed, it can be proposed that midwives were generally valued enough, and earned enough income, to be able to gain their freedom. It is not known from these epitaphs how certain slave women were selected for training as midwives. Slave girls may have been apprenticed, and it is most likely that mothers taught their daughters.

The actual duties of the midwife in antiquity consisted mainly of assisting in the birthing process, although they may also have helped with other medical problems relating to women when needed. Often, the midwife would call for the assistance of a physician when a more difficult birth was anticipated. In many cases the midwife brought along two or three assistants. In antiquity, it was believed by both midwives and physicians that a normal delivery was made easier when a woman sat upright. Therefore, during parturition, midwives brought a stool to the home where the delivery was to take place. In the seat of the birthstool was a crescent-shaped hole through which the baby would be delivered. The birthstool or chair often had armrests for the mother to grasp during the delivery. Most birthstools or chairs had backs which the patient could press against, but Soranus suggests that in some cases the chairs were backless and an assistant would stand behind the mother to support her. The midwife sat facing the mother, encouraging and supporting her through the birth, perhaps offering instruction on breathing and pushing, sometimes massaging her vaginal opening, and supporting her perineum during the delivery of the baby. The assistants may have helped by pushing downwards on the top of the mother's abdomen.

Finally, the midwife received the infant, placed it in pieces of cloth, cut the umbilical cord, and cleansed the baby. The child was sprinkled with "fine and powdery salt, or natron or aphronitre" to soak up the birth residue, rinsed, and then powdered and rinsed again. Next, the midwives cleared away any and all mucus present from the nose, mouth, ears, or anus. Midwives were encouraged by Soranus to put olive oil in the baby's eyes to cleanse away any birth residue, and to place a piece of wool soaked in olive oil over the umbilical cord. After the delivery, the midwife made the initial call on whether or not an infant was healthy and fit to rear. She inspected the newborn for congenital deformities and testing its cry to hear whether or not it was robust and hearty. Ultimately, midwives made a determination about the chances for an infant's survival and likely recommended that a newborn with any severe deformities be exposed.

A 2nd-century terracotta relief from the Ostian tomb of Scribonia Attice, wife of physician-surgeon M. Ulpius Amerimnus, details a childbirth scene. Scribonia was a midwife and the relief shows her in the midst of a delivery. A patient sits in the birth chair, gripping the handles and the midwife's assistant stands behind her providing support. Scribonia sits on a low stool in front of the woman, modestly looking away while also assisting the delivery by dilating and massaging the vagina, as encouraged by Soranus.

The services of a midwife were not inexpensive; this fact that suggests poorer women who could not afford the services of a professional midwife often had to make do with female relatives. Many wealthier families had their own midwives. However, the vast majority of women in the Greco-Roman world very likely received their maternity care from hired midwives. They may have been highly trained or possessed only a rudimentary knowledge of obstetrics. Also, many families had a choice of whether or not they wanted to employ a midwife who practiced the traditional folk medicine or the newer methods of professional parturition. Like a lot of other factors in antiquity, quality gynecological care often depended heavily on the socioeconomic status of the patient.

=== Post-classical history ===
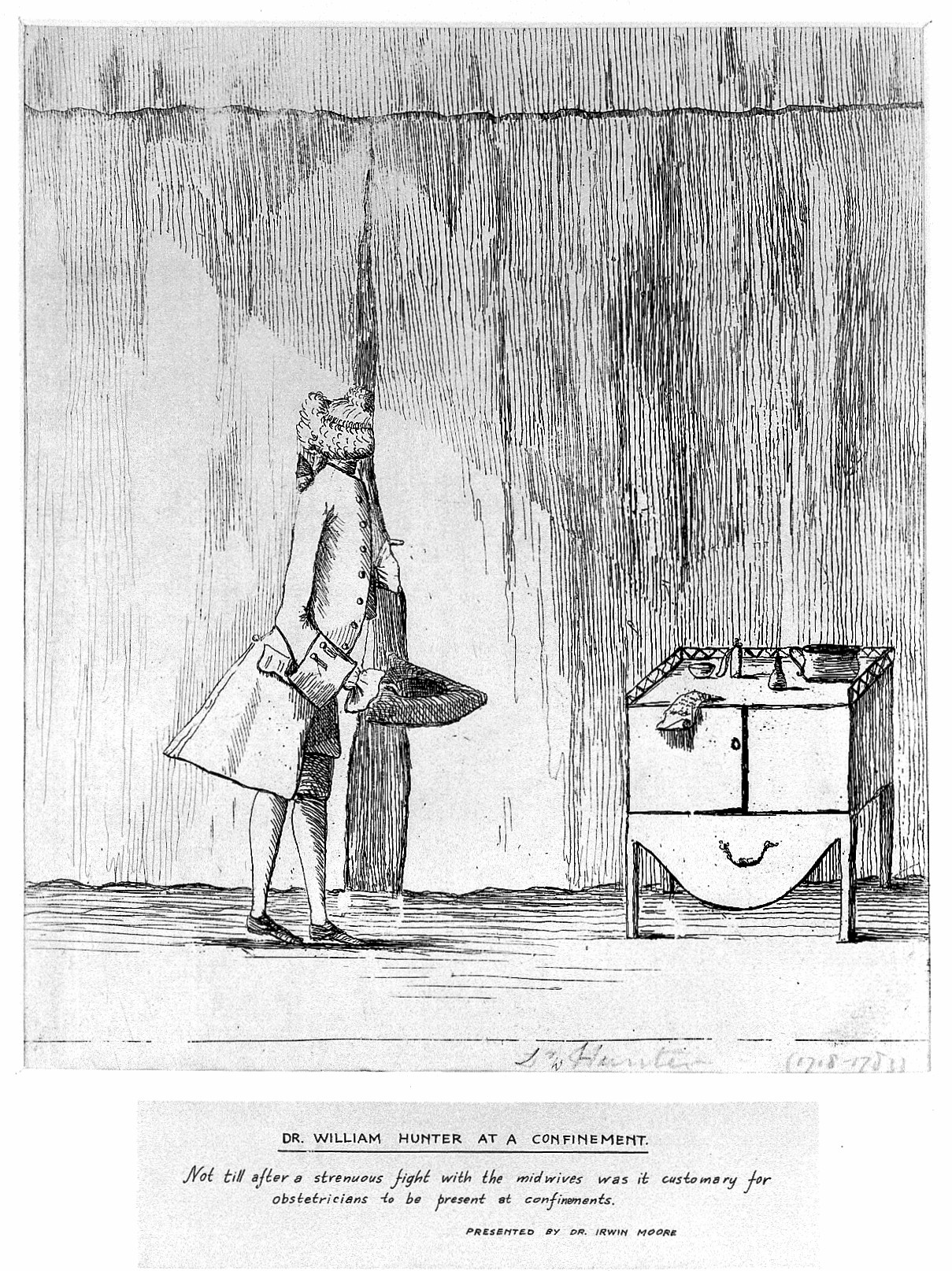
18th-century etching of William Hunter attending a pregnant woman. The caption notes that "not until a strenuous fight with the midwives was it customary for obstetricians to be present at confinements."

=== Early Modern history ===
Midwives were usually older, married or widowed women with their own grown children. However, this was not an absolute, but a commonly recognized pattern. Many midwives were teenagers or unmarried. Throughout the seventeenth century, the literacy of English midwives was quite high, usually surpassing the clientele base they served. By 1634, most English midwives in London could read, which is important since many of them may not have been able to write, only leaving a simple mark as their signature. By the 1660s, country midwives also had high literacy rates which was remarkable considering female literacy was very low during this period.

=== Modern history ===
From the 18th century, a conflict between surgeons and midwives arose, as medical men began to assert that their modern scientific techniques were better for mothers and infants than the folk medicine practiced by midwives. As doctors and medical associations pushed for a legal monopoly on obstetrical care, midwifery became outlawed or heavily regulated throughout the United States and Canada. In Northern Europe and Russia, the situation for midwives was a little easier - in the Duchy of Estonia in Imperial Russia, Professor Christian Friedrich Deutsch established a midwifery school for women at the Imperial University of Dorpat in 1811, which existed until World War I. It was the predecessor for the Tartu Health Care College. Training lasted for 7 months and in the end a certificate for practice was issued to the female students. Despite accusations that midwives were "incompetent and ignorant", some argued that poorly trained surgeons were far more of a danger to pregnant women. In 1846, the physician Ignaz Semmelweiss observed that more women died in maternity wards staffed by male surgeons than by female midwives, and traced these outbreaks of puerperal fever back to (then all-male) medical students not washing their hands properly after dissecting cadavers, but his sanitary recommendations were ignored until acceptance of germ theory became widespread.

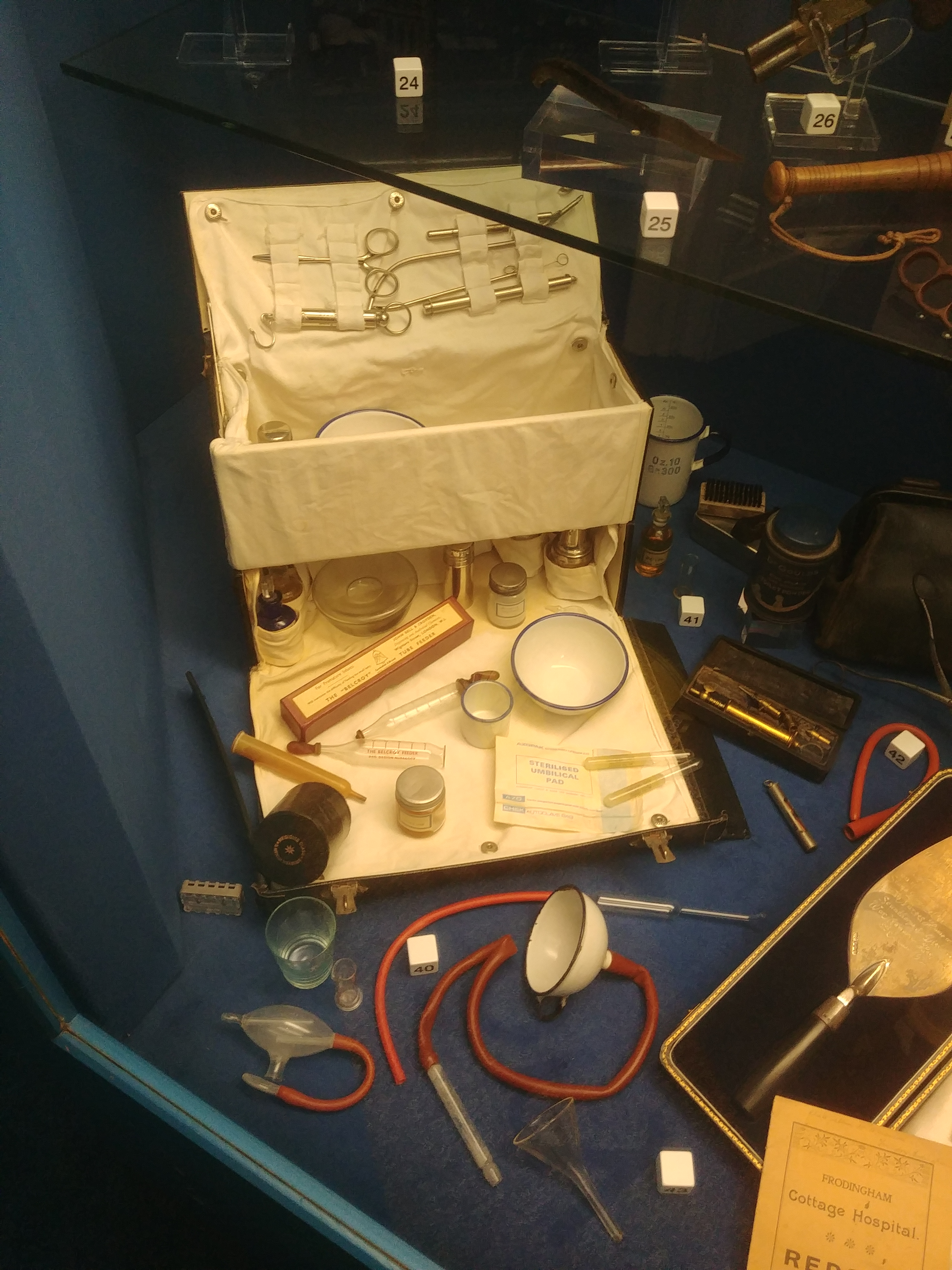
Midwife's case and contents, Scunthorpe Maternity Hospital, 1920s/30s (North Lincolnshire Museum)

The argument that surgeons were more dangerous than midwives lasted until the study of bacteriology became popular in the early 1900s and hospital hygiene was improved. Women began to feel safer in the setting of the hospitals with the amount of aid and the ease of birth that they experienced with doctors. "Physicians trained in the new century found a great contrast between their hospital and obstetrics practice in women's homes where they could not maintain sterile conditions or have trained help." German social scientists Gunnar Heinsohn and Otto Steiger theorize that midwifery became a target of persecution and repression by public authorities because midwives possessed highly specialized knowledge and skills regarding not only assisting birth, but also contraception and abortion.

==== Contemporary ====
At late 20th century, midwives were already recognized as highly trained and specialized professionals in obstetrics. However, at the beginning of the 21st century, the medical perception of pregnancy and childbirth as potentially pathological and dangerous still dominates Western culture. Midwives who work in hospital settings also have been influenced by this view, although by and large they are trained to view birth as a normal and healthy process. While midwives play a much larger role in the care of pregnant mothers in Europe than in America, the medicalized model of birth still has influence in those countries, even though the World Health Organization recommends a natural, normal and humanized birth.

The midwifery model of pregnancy and childbirth as a normal and healthy process plays a much larger role in Sweden and the Netherlands than the rest of Europe, however. Swedish midwives stand out, since they administer 80 percent of prenatal care and more than 80 percent of family planning services in Sweden. Midwives in Sweden attend all normal births in public hospitals and Swedish women tend to have fewer interventions in hospitals than American women. The Dutch infant mortality rate is one of the lowest rate in the world, at 4.0 deaths per thousand births, while the United States ranked twenty-second. Midwives in the Netherlands and Sweden owe a great deal of their success to supportive government policies.

== See also ==
- Afghanistan Midwifery Project
- Childbirth and obstetrics in antiquity
- Global Library of Women's Medicine
- International Confederation of Midwives
- Obstetrics
- Midwifery in Maya society
- History of medicine in the United States
