= History of anatomy in the 19th century =

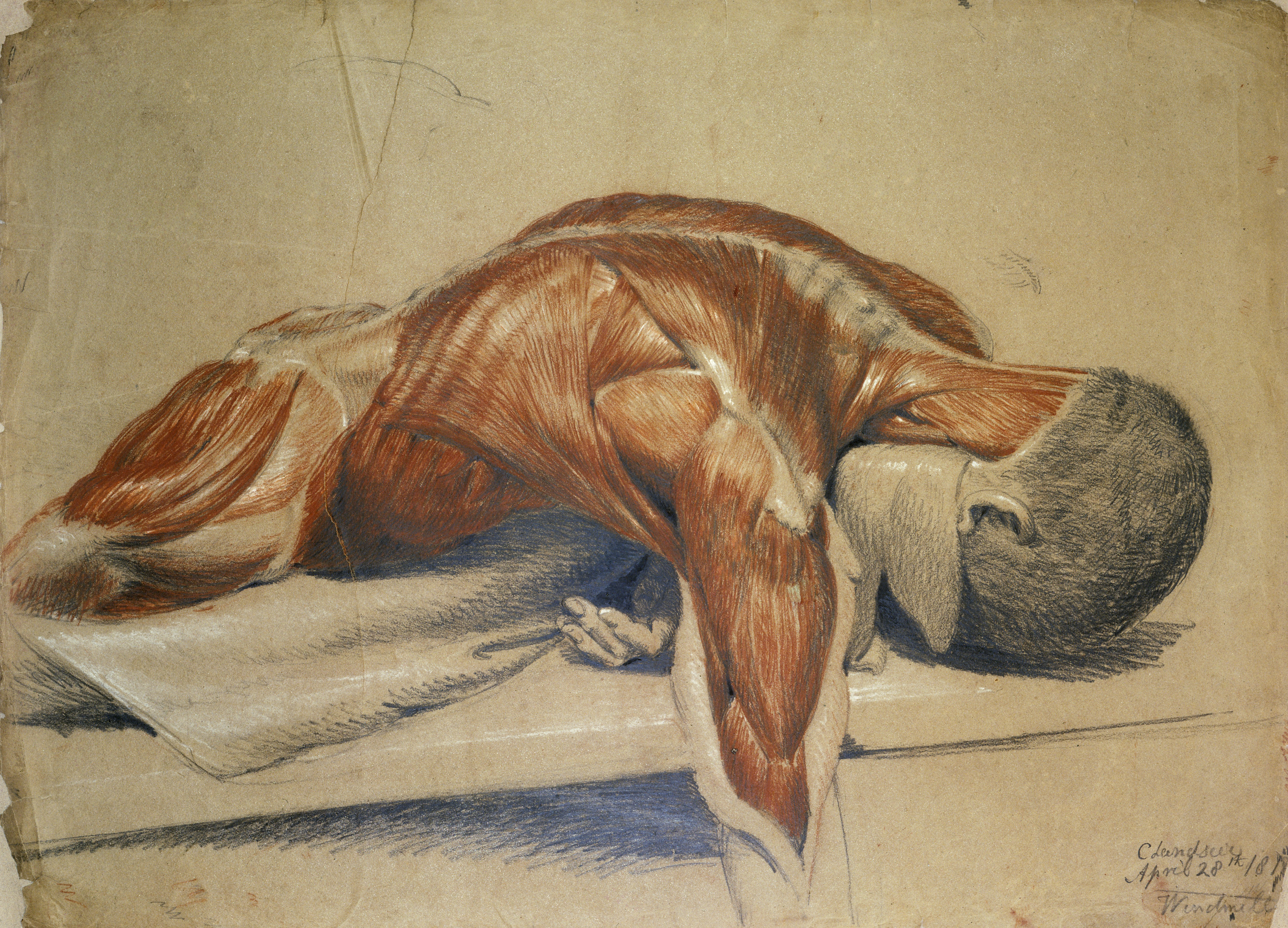
A dissected body, lying prone on a table – one of the series of anatomical paintings made by the 19th Century English painter Charles Landseer.

The history of anatomy in the 19th century saw anatomists largely finalise and systematise the descriptive human anatomy of the previous century. The discipline also progressed to establish growing sources of knowledge in histology and developmental biology, not only of humans but also of animals.

== Anatomical science ==
=== Sommerring ===
Samuel Thomas von Sömmerring originally published a clear, accurate and precise system in German (1791–1796), then in Latin (1794–1800). There was a second German edition in 1800–1801 and a further eight-volume edition (1841–1844) revised and with additional material by Th.L.W. Bischoff, Friedrich Gustav Jakob Henle, E.H. Huschke, Theile, G.G. Valentin, Vogel, and Rudolph Wagner. The arrangement of the edition is:

- Vol. 1: Wagner details the life, correspondence and literary writings of Sommerring;
- Vol. 2: Anatomy of the bones and ligaments;
- Vol. 3: Anatomy of the muscles and the vascular system by Theile;
- Vol. 4: microscopic anatomy of the nervous system by Valentin, including the brain, the spinal cord, and the ganglia;
- Vol. 5: Anatomy of the organs by Huschke – this part of the work had been left incomplete by Sommerring but he had left extensive material to work on;
- Vol. 6: An entire and complete system of general anatomy, deduced from personal observation by Henle and other careful observers, the materials being in general new, and in all instances confirmed and rectified;
- Vol. 7: Developmental biology of mammals and humans, by Bischoff;
- Vol. 8: Pathological anatomy of the human body, by Vogel, but only the generalities of the subject.

This was translated into French by Jourdan, and published in 1846 under the name of Encyclopedie anatomique. The eighth volume was translated into English in the year 1847.

=== Bichat ===
The Anatomie Generale of Xavier Bichat is a monument of his scientific ability and scholarship. His Anatomie Descriptive is distinguished by clear and natural arrangement, precise and accurate description, and the general ingenuity with which the subject is treated. The physiological observations are in general correct, often novel, and always highly interesting. Bichat died during the preparation of the third volume and the work was completed by P.J. Roux and M.F.R. Buisson.

=== Gray ===
Henry Gray, an English anatomist and surgeon at St. George's Hospital, published Gray's Anatomy. With the artist abilities and help of Henry Vandyke Carter, Gray produced an inexpensive and accessible anatomy textbook for medical students. Dissecting unclaimed bodies from workhouse and hospital mortuaries through the Anatomy Act 1832, the two worked for 18 months on what would form the basis of the book. Their work was first published in 1858.

== Social and political issues ==
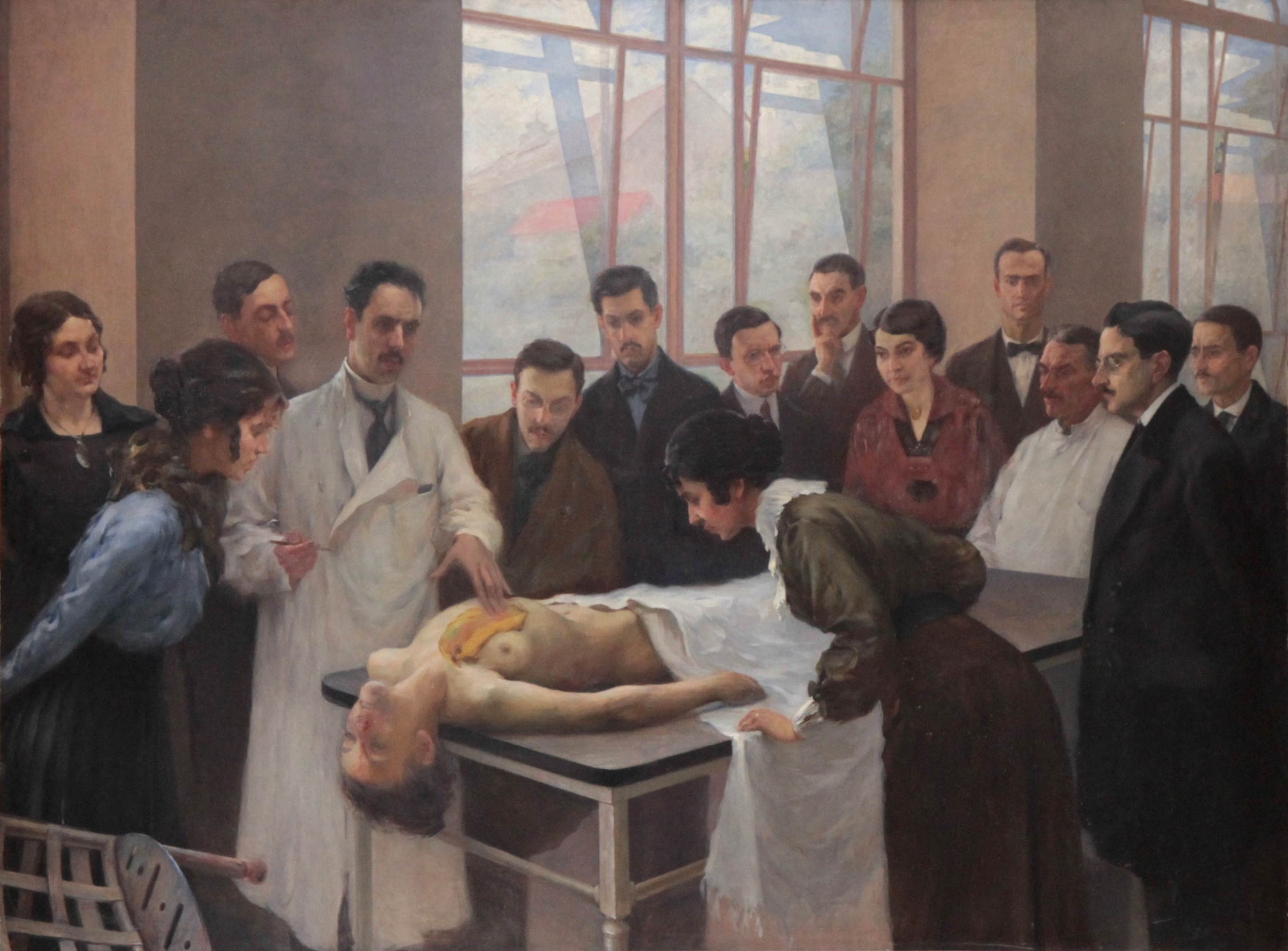
The Master (1914), by Carlos Bonvalot, shows an Anatomy lesson in the early 20th century

The growth of medical science and medical practice created an increased demand for human cadavers for use in medical colleges, particularly for anatomy demonstrations. Before the 19th century, most were bodies of executed criminals or, more rarely, corpses donated by relatives. The reason being, having the body dissected after death was considered to be a fate worse than death. The Murder Act 1751 permitted that the bodies of murderers be dissected after death to contribute to medical knowledge. After the criminal was hanged, medical students would be there as the body was taken down from the gallows and would argue over who would dissect the body, making the anatomist as feared as the executioner himself.

As demand began to outstrip supply, shortage of corpses often discouraged medical schools from scrutinizing their suppliers too closely. Criminal elements were attracted to the lucrative trade and resurrectionists, resorted to Body snatching to supply the market. The scale of the problem can be seen from the 1831 confessions of the London Burkers, who admitted to stealing 500–1000 bodies for anatomists, over a twelve-year career. They received 8–10 guineas for each cadaver accepted.

The practices of the body snatchers caused widespread fear and revulsion as the indignities and humiliation of exhumation were compounded by the horror of being the subject of dissection. The criminal temptations ultimately led to the 1827–1828 West Port murders in Edinburgh, UK, where likely candidates were killed and sold for cash. The murders led to the passing of the Anatomy Act 1832 which finally provided for an adequate and legitimate supply of corpses.

== Bibliography ==
- Burch, Druin (2007). Digging up the Dead: The Life and Times of Astley Cooper, an Extraordinary Surgeon. Chatto & Windus, London.
- MacDonald, H.P. (2005) Human Remains: Episodes in Human Dissection ISBN 0-522-85157-6
- Porter, R. (1997) The Greatest Benefit to Mankind: A Medical History of Humanity from Antiquity to the Present ISBN 0-00-215173-1, pp314–320
- Richardson, R. (2001) Death, Dissection and the Destitute ISBN 0-226-71240-0
- Rosner, L. (2010) The Anatomy Murders: Being the True and Spectacular History of Edinburgh's Notorious Burke and Hare and of the Man of Science Who Abetted Them in the Commission of Their Most Heinous Crimee ISBN 0-8122-4191-6
- Sappol, M. (2002) A Traffic of Dead Bodies: Anatomy and Embodied Social Identity in Nineteenth-century America ISBN 0-691-05925-X
- Shultz, S. M. (1992). Body Snatching: The Robbing of Graves for the Education of Physicians in Early Nineteenth Century American History. Jefferson, NC: McFarland. ISBN 978-0-7864-2232-6.
- Moore, W. (2006). The Knife Man: Blood, Body-Snatching and the Birth of Modern Surgery. London: Transworld Publishers Ltd. ISBN 0-553-81618-7.
