= Ibn Jumayʿ =

12th-century Egyptian physician

Abū al-Makārim Hibat Allāh ibn Zayn al-Dīn ibn Jumayʿ (هبة الله بن جميع, died 1198 / AH 594) was an Egyptian Jewish physician, and the chief physician at the court of Saladin.

== Life ==
Ibn Jumayʿ was born to a Jewish family in Fustat, Egypt. He studied with the physician Ibn al-ʿAynzarbī (died 1153/AH 548) and entered the service of Saladin. According to Ibn Abi Usaibia's Lives of the Physicians, Ibn Jumayʿ wrote eight works on medical-related subjects.

A contemporary of Moses Maimonides, Ibn Jumayʿ "became famous for having prevented a person having a cataleptic fit from being buried alive. He was the author of a number of medical writings, including al-Irshād li-maṣāliḥ, dedicated to al-Baysanī, the vizier to Saladin, and completed by Ibn Jumayʿ al-Isrā’īlī's son Abū Tahir Ismāʿīl."

== Works ==
- Kitāb al-irshād li-masālih an-nufūs waʿl-ajssad [Guide to the Welfare of Souls and Bodies]
- (ed. and tr. by Hartmut Fähndrich) Treatise to Salāh ad-Dīn on the revival of the art of medicine, English and Arab text, Wiesbaden: Steiner, 1983.
