= Carlos Bonvalot =

Portuguese painter (1893–1934)

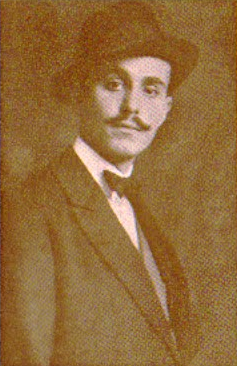
- Born: 24 July 1893; Paço de Arcos, Oeiras, Portugal
- Died: 13 February 1934 (aged 40); Cascais, Portugal
- Occupations: Painter, conservator-restorer

Carlos Augusto Bonvalot (24 July 1893 – 13 February 1934) was an early 20th-century Portuguese painter, noted for his portraits of an intimist nature and for his realist depictions of daily life around the town of Cascais. Apart from painting, Bonvalot was an important authority in conservation and restoration of artworks; most notably, he was a pioneer in the country in the technical examination of paintings using X-rays.
