= Global Library of Women's Medicine =

- Producer: The Foundation for The Global Library of Women's Medicine
- History: 2008-present

Access
- Cost: Open access

Coverage
- Disciplines: Women's health

Print edition
- ISSN: 1756-2228

Links
- Website: www.glowm.com

The Global Library of Women's Medicine (GLOWM) is a free and publicly available resource of clinical information on women's health launched on 20 November 2008. Its purpose is to provide expert support to obstetricians, gynecologists, and reproductive health professionals.

== History ==
The site is contributed to by over 750 people and its main feature is a large library of specially commissioned chapters on most aspects of women's medicine, constantly reviewed and updated. This is supported by an online Learning Assessment option, providing Certificates of Study Completion plus Continuing Professional Development awards for those who undertake this assessment successfully.

The site also includes extensive information on Safer Motherhood providing practical guidance for nurses, midwives and other healthcare workers and it offers a free Safer Motherhood app so that these resources can accompany care providers during their daily work. Whilst the resources provided by GLOWM are designed to be relevant everywhere, there is an additional special focus on the needs of LMICs.

GLOWM is run as a not-for-profit undertaking and it accepts no advertising or commercial sponsorship; its income is dependent on personal donations and unrestricted educational grants.

The editor-in-chief is Professor Kristina Gemzell Danielsson, Department of Women's and Children's Health, Karolinska Institutet, Stockholm, Sweden.

The website has been certified to be "fully compliant with the HONcode standard for trustworthy health information" by the Health On the Net Foundation.

== Welfare of Women ==
The Welfare of Women (WoW) global health program aims to provide women worldwide with clear, reliable and accessible health information, regardless of location, literacy or language, through health messages delivered as short animated videos with voice commentary in different languages. The simple messages are supplemented with text-based information and suggested links to reliable online resources for those seeking deeper knowledge.
