= Afghanistan Midwifery Project =

Non-profit organization

The Afghanistan Midwifery Project (AMP) is a non-profit organization that is dedicated to helping the women of Afghanistan through childbirth, and other women's health issues. Afghanistan currently rests near the bottom of the World Health Organization's list for infant mortality rates, child birth fatalities, and prenatal care.

The primary goal of AMP is to train Afghan women to become midwives. With this training, Afghan women can help themselves and can continue train others to care for pregnant, nursing, and women in labor.

== The Afghanistan Women's Clinic ==
AMP was previously known as the Afghan Women's Clinic, as the effort was dedicated to supporting one small clinic with donations from the friends and family of the American female soldiers serving in the area.
