= Emmylou Harris albums discography =

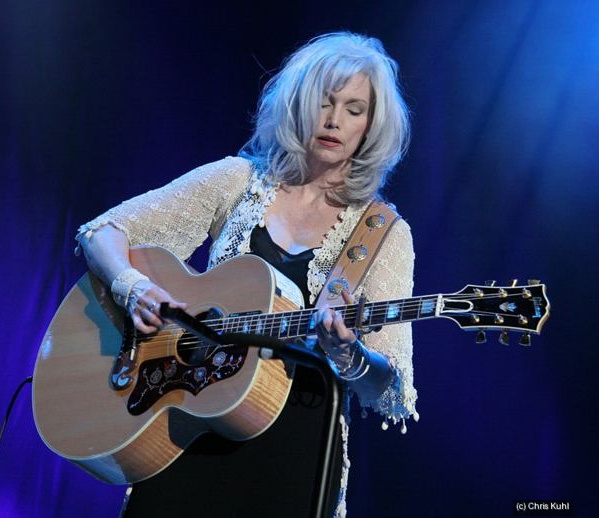
- Emmylou Harris in 2006
- Studio albums: 28
- Soundtrack albums: 1
- Live albums: 5
- Compilation albums: 15
- Video albums: 4
- Solo studio albums: 22
- Collaborative studio albums: 6

The albums discography of American singer–songwriter Emmylou Harris contains 28 studio albums: 22 of which were solo releases while six were released collaboratively with other artists. Her albums discography also includes 15 compilation albums, five live albums, one soundtrack album, four video albums and two box sets. Harris's first studio album Gliding Bird was released in 1969 by Jubilee Records.

In 1975, Reprise Records released her second studio collection titled Pieces of the Sky. It reached the top ten of the American Billboard Top Country Albums chart and the top 50 of the Billboard 200 all-genre chart. It was among seven studio albums released during the 1970s and 1980s that certified gold from the Recording Industry Association of America. It was followed in December 1975 by Elite Hotel, which topped the Billboard country albums chart and peaked at number 25 on the Billboard 200. It also reached the top 20 on the UK Albums Chart and the top five on the Dutch Albums Chart. Her fourth studio collection Luxury Liner was issued in December 1976, which also topped the American country chart and made similar international chart positions. It was also her second album to certify silver by the British Phonographic Industry.

In January 1978, her fifth studio collection Quarter Moon in a Ten Cent Town reached number three on the Top Country Albums list, her third top 40 Billboard 200 entry and her second charting disc in Australia. It was followed in April 1979 by her sixth album titled Blue Kentucky Girl which made similar Billboard chart positions and was her first to enter Canada's RPM Country Albums chart. Her next two studio releases, Roses in the Snow and Evangeline, certified gold in sales from the RIAA. Both collections and 1981's Cimarron reached the Billboard country top five. Harris release five more solo studio efforts during the 1980s, along with the charting compilation Profile II: The Best of Emmylou Harris. In 1987, she collaborated alongside Dolly Parton and Linda Ronstadt for the album Trio. It certified platinum in sales, while topping the Billboard country chart and reached number six on the Billboard 200.

In 1992, Harris's second live album At the Ryman was released and marked her final disc for Warner Bros. Records. In 1993, the Asylum/Elektra labels issued Cowgirl's Prayer and also released Wrecking Ball in 1995. The latter reached chart positions in the United Kingdom, Switzerland and Norway. It was followed by the live album Spyboy in 1998. During the 2000s, the Nonesuch label released a series of Harris's studio discs. This began with Red Dirt Girl in 2000, which returned Harris to the Billboard country top five. In 2003 came the release of Stumble into Grace, which reached similar chart positions. Two more solo studio albums followed through 2011.

Collaboratively, Harris reunited with Dolly Parton and Linda Ronstadt for the 1999 gold-selling album Trio II. Harris and Ronstadt collaborated separately the same year on Western Wall: The Tucson Sessions. Both releases reached top ten Billboard country positions. In 2006, Harris joined Mark Knopfler for All the Roadrunning. It reached the top 20 of the Billboard 200, while also reaching top ten positions in the Netherlands, Norway, Sweden and the United Kingdom. A corresponding live album and video album were released in conjunction with the studio disc. In 2013, Harris joined Rodney Crowell for the album Old Yellow Moon via Nonesuch Records. The album reached the Billboard country top five and number 29 on the Billboard 200. The duo released The Traveling Kind in 2015, which made similar chart positions.

== Studio albums ==
=== Studio albums as lead artist ===
List of studio albums, with selected chart positions and certifications, showing other relevant details
Title	Album details	Peak chart positions										Certifications
Title	Album details	US	US Cou.	AUS	BEL	CAN	CAN Cou.	NED	NOR	SWE	UK	Certifications
Gliding Bird (Note: Gliding Bird was released by Jubilee Records as "Emmy Lou Harris".)	Released: January 23, 1970; Label: Jubilee; Formats: LP	—	—	—	—	—	—	—	—	—	—	
Pieces of the Sky	Released: February 7, 1975; Label: Reprise; Formats: LP, cassette	45	7	—	—	46	—	—	—	—	—	RIAA: Gold
Elite Hotel	Released: December 29, 1975; Label: Reprise; Formats: LP, cassette	25	1	—	—	64	—	3	18	—	17	BPI: Silver; RIAA: Gold
Luxury Liner	Released: December 28, 1976; Label: Reprise; Formats: LP, cassette	21	1	96	—	40	—	3	—	15	17	BPI: Silver; RIAA: Gold
Quarter Moon in a Ten Cent Town	Released: January 6, 1978; Label: Reprise; Formats: LP, cassette	29	3	55	—	26	8	10	—	31	40	RIAA: Gold
Blue Kentucky Girl	Released: April 13, 1979; Label: Warner Bros.; Formats: LP, cassette	43	3	61	—	—	6	21	—	—	—	RIAA: Gold
Light of the Stable	Released: November 1979; Label: Warner Bros.; Formats: LP, cassette	102	22	—	—	—	—	—	—	—	—	
Roses in the Snow	Released: April 30, 1980; Label: Warner Bros.; Formats: LP, cassette	26	2	88	—	—	2	47	—	—	—	RIAA: Gold
Evangeline	Released: January 16, 1981; Label: Warner Bros.; Formats: LP, cassette	22	5	40	—	—	—	43	19	—	53	RIAA: Gold
Cimarron	Released: November 13, 1981; Label: Warner Bros.; Formats: LP, cassette	46	6	91	—	—	—	—	—	—	—	
White Shoes	Released: October 6, 1983; Label: Warner Bros.; Formats: LP, cassette	116	22	—	—	—	—	—	—	—	—	
The Ballad of Sally Rose	Released: February 22, 1985; Label: Warner Bros.; Formats: LP, CD, cassette	171	8	—	—	—	—	—	—	—	—	
Thirteen	Released: February 14, 1986; Label: Warner Bros.; Formats: LP, CD, cassette	157	9	—	—	—	—	—	—	—	—	
Angel Band	Released: July 7, 1987; Label: Warner Bros.; Formats: LP, CD, cassette	166	23	—	—	—	—	—	—	—	—	
Bluebird	Released: January 10, 1989; Label: Warner Bros.; Formats: LP, CD, cassette	—	15	—	—	—	19	—	—	—	—	
Brand New Dance	Released: October 16, 1990; Label: Warner Bros.; Formats: LP, CD, cassette	—	45	—	—	—	—	—	—	—	—	
Cowgirl's Prayer	Released: September 28, 1993; Label: Asylum/Elektra; Formats: CD, cassette	152	34	—	—	—	19	—	—	—	—	
Wrecking Ball	Released: September 26, 1995; Label: Elektra; Formats: CD, cassette	94	—	—	58	—	—	—	30	27	46	
Red Dirt Girl	Released: September 12, 2000; Label: Nonesuch; Formats: CD, cassette	54	5	93	39	29	3	77	5	5	45	
Stumble into Grace	Released: September 23, 2003; Label: Nonesuch; Formats: CD	58	6	92	32	—	—	42	11	12	52	
All I Intended to Be	Released: June 10, 2008; Label: Nonesuch; Formats: CD, music download	22	4	58	20	24	—	41	7	10	40	
Hard Bargain	Released: April 26, 2011; Label: Nonesuch; Formats: CD, music download	18	3	—	39	19	—	15	11	15	30	
"—" denotes a recording that did not chart or was not released in that territory.

=== Studio albums as a collaborative artist ===
List of studio albums, with selected chart positions and certifications, showing other relevant details
Title	Album details	Peak chart positions									Certifications
Title	Album details	US	US Cou.	AUS	CAN	CAN Cou.	NED	NOR	SWE	UK	Certifications
GP (as part of Gram Parsons & The Fallen Angels)	Released: January, 1973; Label: Reprise; Formats: LP	—	—	—	—	—	—	—	—	—	
Grievous Angel (as part of Gram Parsons & The Fallen Angels)	Released: January, 1974; Label: Reprise; Formats: LP	195	—	—	—	—	—	—	—	—	
Trio (with Dolly Parton and Linda Ronstadt)	Released: March 2, 1987; Label: Warner Bros.; Formats: LP, CD, cassette	6	1	12	4	—	22	—	29	60	RIAA: Platinum
Trio II (with Dolly Parton and Linda Ronstadt)	Released: February 9, 1999; Label: Asylum; Formats: CD, cassette	62	4	66	—	4	69	—	—	—	RIAA: Gold
Western Wall: The Tucson Sessions (with Linda Ronstadt)	Released: August 24, 1999; Label: Asylum; Formats: CD, cassette	73	6	—	—	—	—	35	41	—	
All the Roadrunning (with Mark Knopfler)	Released: April 24, 2006; Label: Mercury/Warner Bros.; Formats: CD	17	—	41	—	—	3	1	2	8	BPI: Gold; BVMI: Gold; IFPI (NOR): Platinum; IFPI (SWI): Platinum
Old Yellow Moon (with Rodney Crowell)	Released: February 26, 2013; Label: Nonesuch; Formats: CD, music download	29	4	—	—	—	22	6	12	42	
The Traveling Kind (with Rodney Crowell)	Released: March 12, 2015; Label: Nonesuch; Formats: LP, CD, music download	78	8	—	—	—	—	—	—	65	
Old Yellow Moon (with Rodney Crowell)	Released: February 26, 2013; Label: Nonesuch; Formats: CD, music download	29	4	—	—	—	22	6	12	42	
"—" denotes a recording that did not chart or was not released in that territory.

== Compilation albums ==
List of compilation albums, with selected chart positions and certifications, showing other relevant details
Title	Album details	Peak chart positions			Certifications
Title	Album details	US	US Cou.	UK	Certifications
Profile: Best of Emmylou Harris	Released: November 1978; Label: Warner Bros.; Formats: LP, cassette	81	9	—	MC: Gold; RIAA: Gold
Her Best Songs	Released: 1980; Label: K-tel; Formats: LP, cassette	—	—	36	
Collection	Released: 1982; Label: Warner Bros.; Formats: LP	—	—	—	
Profile II: The Best of Emmylou Harris	Released: September 17, 1984; Label: Warner Bros.; Formats: LP, CD, cassette	176	24	—	
Duets	Released: July 24, 1990; Label: Warner Bros.; Formats: LP, CD, cassette	—	24	—	
Songs of the West	Released: January 1, 1994; Label: Warner Western; Formats: CD, cassette	—	—	—	
Selections from Portraits	Released: 1996; Label: Reprise; Formats: CD	—	—	—	
Anthology: The Warner/Reprise Years	Released: May 1, 2001; Label: Rhino/Warner Bros.; Formats: CD	—	53	—	
Producer's Cut	Released: February 25, 2003; Label: Warner Bros.; Formats: CD	—	—	—	
The Very Best of Emmylou Harris: Heartaches & Highways	Released: July 19, 2005; Label: Rhino/Warner Bros.; Formats: CD	133	23	—	
Original Album Series	Released: April 5, 2011; Label: Rhino; Formats: CD	—	—	—	
Original Album Series, Vol. 2	Released: September 2, 2013; Label: Rhino; Formats: CD	—	—	—	
The Complete Trio Collection (with Dolly Parton and Linda Ronstadt)	Released: September 9, 2016; Label: Rhino; Formats: CD	125	7	47	
Farther Along (with Dolly Parton and Linda Ronstadt)	Released: September 9, 2016; Label: Rhino; Formats: CD	—	—	—	
The Studio Albums: 1980–1983	Released: April 13, 2019; Label: Warner Bros.; Formats: LP	—	—	—	
"—" denotes a recording that did not chart or was not released in that territory.

== Live albums ==
List of live albums, with selected chart positions and certifications, showing other relevant details
Title	Album details	Peak chart positions								Certifications
Title	Album details	US	US Cou.	BEL	NED	GER	NOR	SWE	UK	Certifications
Last Date	Released: October 1982; Label: Warner Bros.; Formats: LP, cassette	65	9	—	—	—	—	—	—	
At the Ryman	Released: January 10, 1992; Label: Warner Bros.; Formats: CD, cassette	184	32	—	—	—	—	—	—	
Spyboy	Released: August 11, 1998; Label: Eminent; Formats: CD, cassette	180	27	—	100	—	31	46	57	
Real Live Roadrunning (with Mark Knopfler)	Released: November 14, 2006; Label: Mercury/Warner Bros.; Formats: CD	—	—	—	—	44	—	—	—	BVMI: Gold
Ramble in Music City: The Lost Concert	Released: September 3, 2021; Label: Nonesuch; Formats: LP, CD	—	—	134	—	—	—	—	—	
The Last Roundup: Live from the Bijou Café in Philadelphia 3/16/1973 (as part of Gram Parsons & The Fallen Angels)	Released: November 24, 2023; Label: Amoeba; Formats: LP, CD, music download	—	—	—	—	—	—	—	—	—
"—" denotes a recording that did not chart or was not released in that territory.

== Soundtrack albums ==
List of soundtrack albums, with selected chart positions and certifications, showing other relevant details
Title	Album details	Peak chart positions					Certifications
Title	Album details	US	US Cou.	AUS	CAN	CAN Cou.	Certifications
Honeysuckle Rose (credited as "Willie Nelson and Family")	Released: July 18, 1980; Label: Columbia; Formats: LP, cassette	11	1	34	24	4	MC: Gold; RIAA: Platinum

== Video albums ==
List of video albums, showing all relevant details
Title	Album details
At the Ryman	Released: March 13, 1992; Label: Warner/Reprise Video; Formats: LaserDisc, VHS
20th Anniversary (with The Hot Band)	Released: 1997; Label: Grapevine; Formats: VHS
Spyboy – Live from the Legendary Exit/In	Released: February 9, 1999; Label: Eminent/Grapevine; Formats: DVD, VHS
Real Live Roadrunning	Released: November 14, 2006; Label: Mercury/Universal; Formats: DVD

== Box sets ==
List of box sets, with selected chart positions, showing other relevant details
Title	Album details	Peak chart positions
Title	Album details	US Country
Portraits	Released: October 8, 1996; Label: Rhino/Warner Bros.; Formats: CD	—
Songbird: Rare Tracks and Forgotten Gems	Released: September 18, 2007; Label: Rhino; Formats: CD	49
"—" denotes a recording that did not chart or was not released in that territory.
