= Songbird: Rare Tracks and Forgotten Gems =

Songbird: Rare Tracks & Forgotten Gems

Box set by Emmylou Harris
- Released: September 18, 2007
- Recorded: 1969–2006
- Genres: Country, folk, rock
- Label: Rhino

Emmylou Harris chronology
Real Live Roadrunning (2006)	Songbird: Rare Tracks & Forgotten Gems (2007)	All I Intended to Be (2008)

Professional ratings
Review scores
Source	Rating
AllMusic	4.5/5 stars
The Austin Chronicle	4/5 stars
Paste Magazine	5/5 stars

Songbird: Rare Tracks & Forgotten Gems is a 2007 box set of songs personally selected by Emmylou Harris: "I've selected not greatest hits, but personal favorites that, with a few exceptions, have never appeared on any other compilations, but were important gems in the string of pearls that each album strives to become. Also included are special collaborations, unreleased live and demo tracks, as well as contributions to tribute projects, which I may now gather into this fold.”

Discs one and two serve as a retrospective of Emmylou's solo career, including at least one song from each of her previous studio and live albums, and two cuts from her time with Gram Parsons. Discs three and four consist of collaborations with other performers, tribute album tracks, and unreleased material. Overall, 13 of the 78 tracks were previously unreleased. The DVD collects 9 videos filmed between 1975 and 2005, plus a public service announcement for Animal Rescue.

== Packaging ==
The 5-disc set (4 CDs & 1 DVD) is packaged in a multi-fold cardboard sleeve bound to mimic a photographic album. A 200-page liner-notes and biography booklet, liberally graced with photos, is also bound to mimic a photographic album. Both faux miniature photo albums are housed in a CD-sized cardboard slipcase.

== Track listing ==
- previously unreleased material

=== Disc One ===
#	Title	Songwriter	Length	Producer	Guests	Source	Date	Notes
1	"Clocks"*	Emmylou Harris	2:48	Ray Ellis		Gliding Bird	1970	Alternate Version
2	"The Angels Rejoiced Last Night"	Charlie Louvin, Ira Louvin	2:23	Gram Parsons, Jim Dickson	Gram Parsons	Sleepless Nights by Gram Parsons	1973	
3	"The Old Country Baptizing"	Carl Story	4:02	John M. Delgatto, Marley Brant	Gram Parsons & The Fallen Angels	Live 1973 by Gram Parsons & The Fallen Angels	March 13, 1973	Live
4	"Coat of Many Colors"	Dolly Parton	3:42	Brian Ahern		Pieces of the Sky	1975	
5	"For No One"	John Lennon, Paul McCartney	3:42	Brian Ahern		Pieces of the Sky	1975	
6	"Ooh Las Vegas"	Ric Grech, Gram Parsons	3:43	Brian Ahern		Elite Hotel	1975	
7	"Satan's Jewel Crown"	Traditional	3:13	Brian Ahern		Elite Hotel	1975	
8	"Tulsa Queen"	Rodney Crowell, Emmylou Harris	4:47	Brian Ahern		Luxury Liner	1977	
9	"My Songbird"	Jesse Winchester	3:09	Brian Ahern		Quarter Moon in a Ten Cent Town	1978	
10	"Green Rolling Hills"	Utah Phillips	3:38	Brian Ahern	Fayssoux Starling McLean	Quarter Moon in a Ten Cent Town	1978	
11	"One Paper Kid"	Walter Martin Cowart	2:57	Brian Ahern	Willie Nelson	Quarter Moon in a Ten Cent Town	1978	
12	"Sorrow In The Wind"	Jean Ritchie	3:30	Brian Ahern	Cheryl White, Sharon White	Blue Kentucky Girl	1979	
13	"Rough And Rocky"	Charles Justice, Shoji Tabuchi	3:52	Brian Ahern		Blue Kentucky Girl	1979	
14	"Jordan"	Traditional	2:10	Brian Ahern	Johnny Cash	Roses in the Snow	1980	
15	"The Darkest Hour Is Just Before Dawn"	Ralph Stanley	3:24	Brian Ahern	Ricky Skaggs	Roses in the Snow	1980	
16	"Ashes by Now"	Rodney Crowell	4:31	Brian Ahern	Dr. John	Evangeline	1981	
17	"How High the Moon"	Nancy Hamilton, Morgan Lewis	3:23	Brian Ahern		Evangeline	1981	
18	"Spanish Johnny"	Paul Siebel	3:50	Brian Ahern	Waylon Jennings	Evangeline	1981	
19	"Last Cheater's Waltz"	Sonny Throckmorton	5:35	Brian Ahern		Cimarron	1981	
20	"Racing In The Streets"	Bruce Springsteen	5:32	Brian Ahern		Last Date	1982	
21	"Like an Old Fashioned Waltz"	Sandy Denny	3:20	Brian Ahern		White Shoes	1983	

=== Disc Two ===
#	Title	Songwriter	Length	Producer	Guests	Source	Date	Notes
1	"The Sweetheart Of The Rodeo"	Emmylou Harris, Paul Kennerley	3:40	Emmylou Harris, Paul Kennerley	Dolly Parton, Linda Ronstadt, Vince Gill, Gail Davies	The Ballad of Sally Rose	1985	
2	"When I Was Yours"	Emmylou Harris, Paul Kennerley	2:45	Emmylou Harris, Paul Kennerley		Thirteen	1985	
3	"My Father's House"	Bruce Springsteen	4:48	Emmylou Harris, Paul Kennerley	Dolly Parton, Linda Ronstadt	Thirteen	1986	
4	"Bright Morning Star"	Traditional	2:33	Emory Gordy, Jr., Emmylou Harris		Angel Band	1987	
5	"When He Calls"	Paul Kennerley	2:44	Emory Gordy Jr., Emmylou Harris		Angel Band	1987	
6	"Lonely Street"	Carl Belew, W.S. Stevenson, Kenny Sowder	3:12	Richard Bennett, Emmylou Harris		Bluebird	1988	
7	"Brand New Dance"	Paul Kennerley	3:27	Richard Bennett, Allen Reynolds		Brand New Dance	1990	
8	"Get Up John"	Bill Monroe, Marty Stuart, Jerry Sullivan	3:14	Richard Bennett, Allen Reynolds		At the Ryman	1992	Live
9	"If I Could Be There"	Kieran Kane, Jamie O'Hara	3:46	Richard Bennett, Allen Reynolds		At the Ryman	1992	Live
10	"Ballad Of A Runaway Horse"	Leonard Cohen	5:39	Richard Bennett, Allen Reynolds		Cowgirl's Prayer	1993	
11	"Going Back To Harlan"	Anna McGarrigle	4:55	Daniel Lanois		Wrecking Ball	1995	
12	"Sweet Old World"	Lucinda Williams	5:06	Daniel Lanois		Wrecking Ball	1995	
13	"All My Tears"	Julie Miller	5:08	Buddy Miller, Emmylou Harris		Spyboy	1998	Live
14	"Prayer In Open D"	Emmylou Harris	3:59	Buddy Miller, Emmylou Harris		Spyboy	1998	Live
15	"Bang The Drum Slowly"	Emmylou Harris, Guy Clark	4:53	Malcolm Burn		Red Dirt Girl	2000	
16	"Boy From Tupelo"	Emmylou Harris	3:49	Malcolm Burn		Red Dirt Girl	2000	
17	"Lost Unto This World"	Emmylou Harris, Daniel Lanois	4:35	Malcolm Burn		Stumble into Grace	2003	
18	"Man Is An Island"	Kate McGarrigle, Anna McGarrigle, Jane McGarrigle	4:45	Brian Ahern		Light of the Stable reissue	2004	
19	"Cup Of Kindness"	Emmylou Harris	3:54	Malcolm Burn		Stumble into Grace	2003	

=== Disc Three ===
#	Title	Songwriter	Length	Producer	Guests	Source	Date	Notes
1	"Falling In A Deep Hole"*	Bill Danoff, Taffy Danoff	2:38			unissued		
2	"1917"	David Olney	5:22	Glyn Johns	Linda Ronstadt	Western Wall: The Tucson Sessions	1999	
3	"Palms of Victory"*	John B. Matthias	3:07	Brian Ahern	Dolly Parton, Linda Ronstadt	Trio sessions outtake	1978	
4	"Softly and Tenderly"*	Traditional	5:29	George Massenburg	Dolly Parton, Linda Ronstadt	Trio II sessions outtake	1998	
5	"My Dear Companion"	Jean Ritchie	2:56	George Massenburg	Dolly Parton, Linda Ronstadt	Trio	1987	
6	"Mary Danced With Soldiers"	Paul Kennerley	3:06	Randy Scruggs, Nitty Gritty Dirt Band	Nitty Gritty Dirt Band	Will the Circle Be Unbroken: Volume Two	1989	
7	"I Don't Love You Much Do I"	Guy Clark, Richard Leigh	2:37	Guy Clark, Miles Wilkinson	Guy Clark	Boats to Build	1992	
8	"All I Left Behind"*	Emmylou Harris, Anna McGarrigle, Kate McGarrigle	3:17		Anna McGarrigle, Kate McGarrigle, Michele Pepin	unissued demo		
9	"I Remember You"	Steve Earle	2:51	Twangtrust	Steve Earle	Jerusalem	2002	
10	"Golden Ring"	Bobby Braddock, Rafe Van Hoy	3:59	Emmylou Harris, Michele Pepin	Linda Ronstadt, Anna McGarrigle, Kate McGarrigle	Tammy Wynette Remembered	1998	
11	"Sonny"	Ron Hynes	4:18	Donal Lunny	Dolores Keane, Mary Black	Bringing It All Back Home	1991	
12	"In the Garden"*	Traditional	2:49	Daniel Lanois		All the Pretty Horses project, not issued	1996	
13	"Love Still Remains"	Kate Wolf	4:35	Nina Gerber		Treasures Left Behind: Remembering Kate Wolf	1998	
14	"Snake Song"	Townes Van Zandt	2:32	Freddy Fletcher, Eric Paul		Poet: A Tribute to Townes Van Zandt	2001	
15	"Hobo's Lullaby"	Goebel Reeves	2:43	Emmylou Harris		Folkways: A Vision Shared	1988	
16	"Wondering"	Joe Werner	3:03	Gail Davies		Caught in the Webb: A Tribute to the Legendary Webb Pierce	2002	
17	"Immigrant Eyes"*	Guy Clark, Roger Murrah	3:40	Paul Kennerley		unissued	2001	
18	"Juanita"	Chris Hillman, Gram Parsons	2:40	Sheryl Crow, Emmylou Harris	Sheryl Crow	Return of the Grievous Angel: A Tribute to Gram Parsons	1999	
19	"She"	Chris Ethridge, Gram Parsons	4:49	Stephen Street	Chrissie Hynde/The Pretenders	Return of the Grievous Angel: A Tribute to Gram Parsons	1999	
20	"Sin City"	Chris Hillman, Gram Parsons	4:00	Emmylou Harris, Paul Kremen	Beck	Return of the Grievous Angel: A Tribute to Gram Parsons	1999	
21	"Wheels"	Chris Hillman, Gram Parsons	3:27	John Starling, Bill Wolf, The Seldom Scene	Lou Reid/The Seldom Scene	15th Anniversary Celebration	1988	

=== Disc Four ===
#	Title	Songwriter	Length	Producer	Guests	Source	Date	Notes
1	"Beyond The Blue"	Beth Nielsen Chapman, Gary Nicholson	4:33	Buddy Miller, Steve Fishell	Patty Griffin	Where the Heart Is: Original Soundtrack	2000	
2	"First In Line"*	Paul Kennerley	3:34		John Starling	Spring Training	1990	
3	"Highway Of Heartache"*	Carl Jackson	3:04	Carl Jackson	Carl Jackson	Spring Training	1990	
4	"Alone and Forsaken"	Hank Williams Sr	3:31	Mark Knopfler	Mark Knopfler & His Band	Hank Williams: Timeless	2001	
5	"Child Of Mine"	Carole King, Gerry Goffin	3:27	Emmylou Harris		Til Their Eyes Shine ... The Lullaby Album	1992	
6	"Heaven Ain't Ready For You Yet"	Paul Kennerley	3:56	Glyn Johns		The Legend of Jesse James	1980	
7	"Wish We Were Back In Missouri"	Guy Humphreys, Paul Kennerley	4:03	Glyn Johns		The Legend of Jesse James	1980	
8	"Mama's Hungry Eyes"	Merle Haggard	3:41		Brian Ahern	Mama's Hungry Eyes: A Tribute to Merle Haggard	1994	
9	"Here We Are"	Rodney Crowell	2:53	Billy Sherrill	George Jones	My Very Special Guests	1979	
10	"Waltz Across Texas Tonight"*	Rodney Crowell, Emmylou Harris	3:43	Allen Reynolds, Richard Bennett		Cowgirl's Prayer sessions	1993	
11	"Snowin' On Raton"*	Townes Van Zandt	3:42	Allen Reynolds, Richard Bennett		Brand New Dance sessions	1990	
12	"Gone"*	Liz Meyer	3:37	Allen Reynolds, Richard Bennett		Cowgirl's Prayer sessions	1993	
13	"Don't Let Our Love Die"*	Michael Dowling, Alan O'Bryant	3:18	Carl Jackson	Carl Jackson	Spring Training sessions		
14	"The Pearl"	Emmylou Harris	5:19	Julia Olin		Concerts for a Landmine-Free World	2000	Live
15	"Wildwood Flower"	Traditional	3:47	Randy Scruggs	Randy Scruggs, Iris DeMent	Crown of Jewels	1998	
16	"Love And Happiness"	Emmylou Harris, Kimmie Rhodes	4:21	Mark Knopfler, Chuck Ainlay	Mark Knopfler	All the Roadrunning	2006	
17	"When We're Gone, Long Gone"	Kieran Kane, Jamie O'Hara	4:01	George Massenburg	Linda Ronstadt, Dolly Parton	Trio II	1998	

=== DVD ===
1. "Together Again" – with The Hot Band, featuring James Burton (1975)
2. "Making Believe" – with The Hot Band, featuring Albert Lee, from the BBC's The Old Grey Whistle Test (April 11, 1977)
3. "Blue Kentucky Girl" – from PBS' Soundstage (1978)
4. "Satan's Jewel Crown" – from PBS' Soundstage (1978)
5. "Mr. Sandman" – Promotional video (1981)
6. "I Don't Have to Crawl" – Promotional video (1981)
7. "I Ain't Living Long Like This" – with Spyboy (1998)
8. "Love Hurts" – at The Grand Ole Opry, with Elvis Costello (February 17, 2006)
9. "Imagine" – from CMT's Crossroads (January 4, 2004)
10. "PSA: Emmylou Harris on Animal Rescue"

== Personnel ==
=== Disc 1 ===
- Vocals: Johnny Cash, Emmylou Harris, Waylon Jennings, Fayssoux Starling McLean, Willie Nelson, Gram Parsons, Ricky Skaggs, Barry Tashian
- Guitar: Brian Ahern, Mike Auldridge, Jock Bartley, James Burton, Rodney Crowell, Rick Cunha, Jerry Douglas, Amos Garrett, Emmylou Harris,
  Bernie Leadon, Albert Lee, Gram Parsons, Herb Pedersen, Frank Reckard, Tony Rice, Ricky Skaggs, John Starling, Barry Tashian
- Pedal Steel: Hank DeVito, Steve Fishell, Neil Flanz, Ben Keith, Al Perkins
- Mandolin: Byron Berline, Wayne Goodwin, Albert Lee, Ricky Skaggs
- Bass: Brian Ahern, Mike Bowden, Emory Gordy, Emmylou Harris, Ray Pohlman, Kyle Tullis
- Keyboards: Tony Brown, Glen Hardin, Dr. John, Don Johnson, Lynn Langham, Bill Payne
- Accordion: Lincoln Davis Jr.
- Drums: Hal Blaine, N. D. Smart, Ron Tutt, John Ware
- Percussion: Brian Ahern
- Viola: Ricky Skaggs
- Fiddle: Byron Berline, Ricky Skaggs
- Saxophone: Wayne Goodwin
- Recorder: Jim Horn
- Harmonica: Mickey Raphael
- Harmony & Backing Vocals: Rodney Crowell, Emory Gordy, Don Johnson, Herb Pedersen, Tony Rice, John Starling, Cheryl White, Sharon White

=== Disc 2 ===
- Vocals: Brady Blade, Vince Gill, Carl Jackson, Daryl Johnson, Daniel Lanois, Buddy Miller, Dolly Parton, Linda Ronstadt
- Guitar: Brian Ahern, Richard Bennett, Malcolm Burn, Steve Earle, Steve Fishell, Carl Jackson, Ethan Johns, Daniel Lanois, Albert Lee,
  Chris Leuzinger, Kate McGarrigle, Buddy Miller, Al Perkins, Kevin Salem
- Pedal Steel: Steve Fishell
- Banjo: Brian Ahern, Kate McGarrigle, Al Perkins
- Mandolin: Richard Bennett, Sam Bush, Vince Gill, Daniel Lanois, Frank Reckard, Jon Randall Stewart
- Bass: Brian Ahern, Richard Bennett, Mike Bowden, Malcolm Burn, Emory Gordy, Tony Hall, Daryl Johnson, Daniel Lanois, Dave Pomeroy, Bob Wray
- Keyboards: Malcolm Burn, Glen Hardin, David Hoffner, Shane Keister, Daniel Lanois, Carl Marsh, Anna McGarrigle, Kate McGarrigle, Bobby Wood
- Accordion: Anna McGarrigle
- Drums: Larry Atamanuik, Brady Blade, Brian Blade, Malcolm Burn, Ethan Johns, Russ Kunkel, Larry Mullen, Jr., Milton Sledge, Steve Turner
- Percussion: Malcolm Burn, Tony Hall, Daryl Johnson, Joe Loesch, Kenny Malone, Larry Mullen, Billy Thomas
- Fiddle: Sam Bush, Mark O'Connor, Buddy Spicher
- Strings: Roy Huskey Jr., Mark O'Connor
- Irish Pipes: Ethan Johns, Liam O'Flynn, Davy Spillane
- Harmony & Backing Vocals: Larry Atamanuik, Mary Black, Malcolm Burn, Sam Bush, Kathy Chiavola, Iris Dement, Emory Gordy, Daryl Johnson,
  Dolores Keane, Mary Ann Kennedy, Daniel Lanois, Anna McGarrigle, Kate McGarrigle, Julie Miller, Al Perkins, Pam Rose, Jane Siberry, Jon Randall Stewart

=== Disc 3 ===
- Vocals: Eric Ambel, Mary Black, Guy Clark, Sheryl Crow, Steve Earle, Jonathan Edwards, Beck Hansen, Chrissie Hynde, Dolores Keane, Anna McGarrigle,
  Kate McGarrigle, Dolly Parton, Michele Pepin, Lou Reid, Linda Ronstadt
- Guitar: Brian Ahern, Eric Ambel, Pat Bergeson, James Burton, Mark Casstevens, Guy Clark, Sheryl Crow, Jerry Douglas, Steve Earle, Jonathan Edwards,
  Jeff Hanna, Beck Hansen, Smokey Hormel, Ethan Johns, Paul Kennerley, Daniel Lanois, Greg Leisz, Scott Neubert, Mark O'Connor, Michele Pepin,
  David Rawlings, Tony Rice, Randy Scruggs, Adam Seymour, Tim Smith, Verlon Thompson, Jeff Trott, Kenny Vaughan
- Pedal Steel: Mike Auldridge, Johnny Cox, Greg Leisz, JayDee Maness
- Banjo: Steve Earle, Kate McGarrigle
- Mandolin: John Duffey, Steve Earle, David Grisman, Albert Lee, Mark O'Connor, Marty Stuart
- Spanish guitar: Ethan Johns
- Bass: Travis Clark, Steve Earle, Kenny Edwards, Emory Gordy, Andy Hobson, Roy Huskey, Daniel Lanois, Bernie Leadon, Kelley Looney, Justin Meldal-Johnsen, Edgar Meyer, Michele Pepin, Rob Price, Lou Reid, Tim Smith, Gillian Welch
- Keyboards: Peter Bonta, Steve Earle, Aaron Embry, Daryl Johnson, Paul Kennerley, Chris Nole, Bill Payne, Benmont Tench
- Accordion: Bob Carpenter, Pat Crowley, Anna McGarrigle, Joey Miskulin, Wix Wickens
- Drums: Martin Chambers, Ken Coomer, Jimmie Fadden, Victor Indrizzo, Dave Lewis, Robbie Magruder, Kenny Malone, John McColgan, Kate McGarrigle,
  Bob Mummert, Will Rigby, Joey Waronker, Greg Williams
- Percussion: Sylvain Clavet, Patrick Earle, Ethan Johns
- Fiddle: Mark O'Connor, Gabe Witcher
- Irish Pipes: Liam O'Flynn, Davy Spillane
- Strings: Roy Huskey, Ethan Johns, Alison Krauss, David Lindley, Mark O'Connor
- Harmonica: Pat Bergeson, Steve Earle
- Harmony & Backing Vocals: Bob Carpenter, Jeff Hanna, Jimmy Ibbotson, Anna McGarrigle, Patty Mitchell, David Rawlings, Gillian Welch

=== Disc 4 ===
- Vocals: Iris Dement, Patty Griffin, Carl Jackson, George Jones, Mary Ann Kennedy, Mark Knopfler, Dolly Parton, Linda Ronstadt, Pam Rose, John Starling
- Guitar: Brian Ahern, Richard Bennett, Rodney Crowell, Dan Dugmore, Guy Fletcher, Carl Jackson, Ethan Johns, Mark Knopfler, Albert Lee, Chris Leuzinger,
  Buddy Miller, Al Perkins, Emily Robison, Pam Rose, Randy Scruggs, John Starling, Jon Randall Stewart
- Pedal Steel: Hank DeVito, Steve Fishell
- Banjo: Bernie Leadon
- Mandolin: Sam Bush, Glen Duncan, David Grisman, Mike Henderson, Mary Ann Kennedy, Martie Maguire
- Bass: Emory Gordy, Roy Huskey, Daryl Johnson, Dave Pomeroy, Bob Wray, Glenn Worf
- Keyboards: Jim Cox, Guy Fletcher, Tim Gorman, Glen Hardin, David Hoffner, John Jarvis, Geraint Watkins
- Accordion: Nick DeCaro
- Drums: Larry Atamanuik, Chad Cromwell, Danny Cummings, Patty Griffin, Levon Helm, Jim Keltner, Paul McInerney, Milton Sledge, Harry Stinson,
  Steve Turner, John Ware
- Percussion: Daryl Johnson
- Harmonica: Mickey Raphael
- Fiddle: Sam Bush, Glen Duncan, Alison Krauss
- Strings: Nick DeCaro, Emory Gordy, Roy Huskey
- Harmony & Backing Vocals: Mary Chapin Carpenter, Donivan Cowart, Tim Gorman, Levon Helm, Carl Jackson, Paul Kennerley, Albert Lee, Jody Payne,
  Jon Randall Stewart

== Chart performance ==
Chart (2007)	Peak position
U.S. Billboard Top Country Albums	49

== Release history ==
Release history and formats for Songbird: Rare Tracks and Forgotten Gems
Region	Date	Format	Label	Ref.
North America	September 18, 2007	CD	Warner Bros. Records	
