= Songs of the West (Emmylou Harris album) =

Compilation album by Emmylou Harris
- Released: January 1, 1994
- Genre: Country
- Length: 35:53
- Label: Warner Bros.
- Producer: Brian Ahern; Paul Kennerley; Emmylou Harris; Allen Reynolds; Richard Bennett

Emmylou Harris chronology
Cowgirl's Prayer (1993)	Songs of the West (1994)	Wrecking Ball (1995)

Professional ratings
Review scores
Source	Rating
Allmusic	2/5 stars
Robert Christgau	(1-star Honorable Mention)

Songs of the West is a compilation of "western"-themed songs by Emmylou Harris taken from eight of her previous albums originally released between 1975 and 1992.

== Track listing ==
No.	Title	Writer(s)	Original album	Length
1.	"I'll Be Your San Antone Rose"	Susanna Clark	Luxury Liner (1976)	3:43
2.	"Even Cowgirls Get the Blues"	Rodney Crowell	Blue Kentucky Girl (1979)	3:56
3.	"Amarillo"	Emmylou Harris, Rodney Crowell	Elite Hotel (1975)	3:05
4.	"The Sweetheart of the Rodeo"	Emmylou Harris, Paul Kennerley	The Ballad of Sally Rose (1985)	3:42
5.	"Queen of the Silver Dollar"	Shel Silverstein	Pieces of the Sky (1975)	5:14
6.	"One Paper Kid" (with Willie Nelson)	Walter Martin Cowart	Quarter Moon in a Ten Cent Town (1978)	2:58
7.	"Rose of Cimarron"	Rusty Young	Cimarron (1981)	4:18
8.	"Spanish Is a Loving Tongue" (with Fayssoux Starling)	Traditional; arranged by Brian Ahern	Cimarron	3:20
9.	"Cattle Call"	Tex Owens	At the Ryman (1992)	2:52
10.	"Montana Cowgirl"	Ray Park	At the Ryman	2:45
Total length:				35:53

== Release history ==
Release history and formats for Songs of the West
Region	Date	Format	Label	Ref.
North America	January 1, 1994	CD; cassette	Warner Bros. Records	
