= List of other album appearances by Dolly Parton =

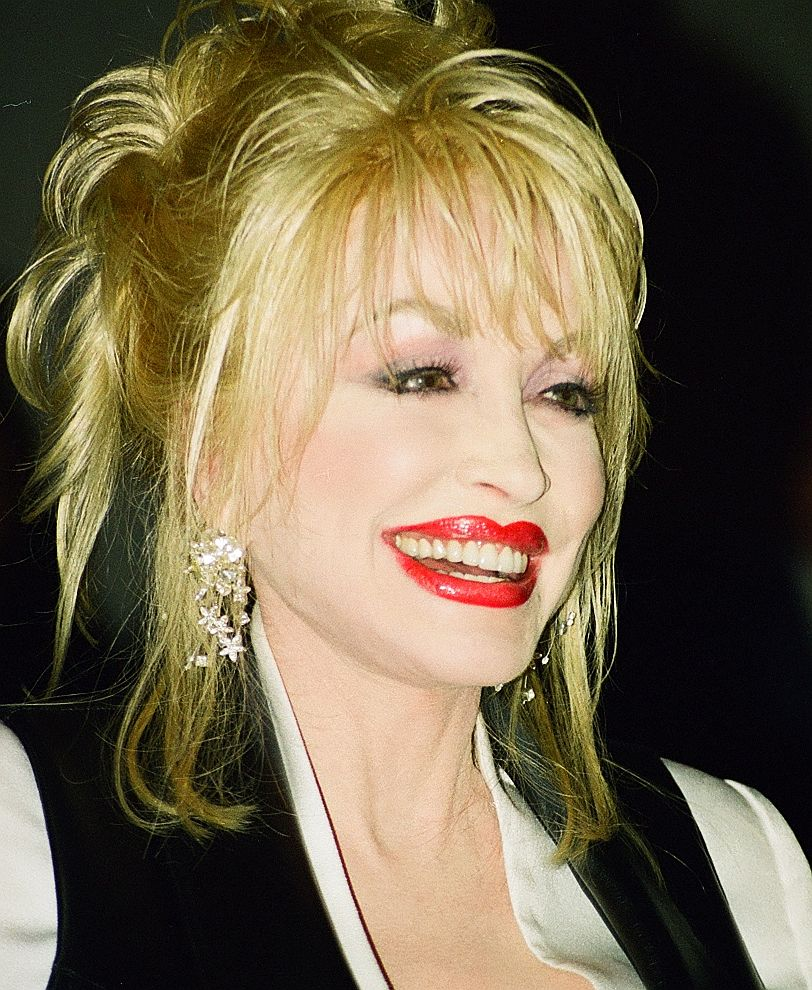
Parton in 2003

Dolly Parton contributed to over 100 albums throughout her career. These contributions range from solo recordings and duets to providing backing and harmony vocals for other artists. This additional work spanned Parton's entire career, beginning in 1966 when she provided uncredited harmony vocals on Bill Phillips' recording of her composition "Put It Off Until Tomorrow", through her collaboration with Beyoncé in 2024 on "Dolly P" and "Tyrant".

== Other album appearances ==
List of other album appearances, showing year released, other artists, and album name
Title	Year	Other artist(s)	Album	Ref.
"Put It Off Until Tomorrow"	1966	Bill Phillips	Put It Off Until Tomorrow	
"Friends Tell Friends"	1967	Bill Phillips	Bill Phillips' Style	
"Tomorrow's Tears Today"	1970	Billy Earl and the Kinfolks	Dolly Parton Presents Billy Earl and the Kinfolks	
"Would You Believe"	1970	Billy Earl and the Kinfolks	Dolly Parton Presents Billy Earl and the Kinfolks	
"I'll Introduce You"	1970	Billy Earl and the Kinfolks	Dolly Parton Presents Billy Earl and the Kinfolks	
"Dolly Parton's Opry Memories" (Note: This is Parton's spoken word introduction to her 1971 recording of "Coat of Many Colors" on this LP.)	1976	—N/a	Great Moments at the Grand Ole Opry	
"Good Ole Country Baptizin'"	1976	Mary Kay Place	Tonite! At the Capri Lounge…Loretta Haggers	
"Coke and Chips"	1976	Mary Kay Place	Tonite! At the Capri Lounge…Loretta Haggers	
"All I Can Do"	1976	Mary Kay Place	Tonite! At the Capri Lounge…Loretta Haggers	
"Do I Ever Cross Your Mind"	1976	Chet Atkins	The Best of Chet Atkins & Friends	
"When I Stop Dreaming"	1976	Emmylou Harris	Luxury Liner	
"I Never Will Marry"	1977	Linda Ronstadt	Simple Dreams	
"Cora Is Gone"	1977	Herb Pedersen	Sandman	
"If I Lose"	1977	Herb Pedersen and the Howdy-Cracker Vocal Revue (Note: The Howdy-Cracker Vocal Revue is Linda Ronstadt, Jill Gordon, Dolly Parton, Johnny Rivers, Gene Moreford, Lowell George, Michael McGinnis, Dennis Brooks, and "Little Joey" Scarbury)	Sandman	
"Even Cowgirls Get the Blues"	1979	Emmylou Harris and Linda Ronstadt	Blue Kentucky Girl	
"Light of the Stable"	1979	Emmylou Harris, Linda Ronstadt, and Neil Young	Light of the Stable: The Christmas Album	
"Green Pastures"	1980	Emmylou Harris and Ricky Skaggs	Roses in the Snow	
"Evangeline"	1981	Emmylou Harris and Linda Ronstadt	Evangeline	
"Mr. Sandman"	1981	Emmylou Harris and Linda Ronstadt	Evangeline	
"My Blue Tears"	1982	Linda Ronstadt and Emmylou Harris	Get Closer	
"Islands in the Stream"	1983	Kenny Rogers	Eyes That See in the Dark	
"A Vision of Mother"	1983	Ricky Skaggs	Don't Cheat in Our Hometown	
"Don't Step Over an Old Love"	1983	Ricky Skaggs	Don't Cheat in Our Hometown	
"Coat of Many Colors"	1983	Porter Wagoner	One for the Road	
"Unwed Fathers"	1984	Gail Davies	Where Is a Woman to Go	
Multiple songs (Note: Parton provided background vocals on multiple songs on Emmylou Harris' 1985 album The Ballad of Sally Rose, but the liner notes do not indicate which songs she contributed to.)	1985	Emmylou Harris	The Ballad of Sally Rose	
"Most of All Why"	1989	Holly Dunn	The Blue Rose of Texas	
"Sisters"	1989	Stella Parton	Always Tomorrow	
"Do I Ever Cross Your Mind"	1990	Randy Travis	Heroes & Friends	
"Love Is Strange"	1990	Kenny Rogers	Love Is Strange	
"Waitin' for the Phone to Ring"	1991	Patty Loveless	Up Against My Heart	
"Mother Church" (Note: There are two different mixes of this song. The version on Pure Gold features quieter choir-style backing vocals, while the version used in the music video and released on Wagoner's 2007 album Best of Grand Ole Gospel 2008 features louder backing vocals where individual members voices can be heard.)	1991	Porter Wagoner, Roy Acuff, Little Jimmy Dickens, Hank Snow, Connie Smith, Grandpa Jones, and Bill Monroe	Pure Gold	
"Dreams Do Come True"	1991	Bill Owens	Dreams Do Come True	
"Vagabond"	1991	Bill Owens, Stella Parton, and Cassie Parton	Bill Owens	
"It Seems Like a Lifetime"	1991	Bill Owens, Stella Parton, and Cassie Parton	Bill Owens	
"Corner of the World"	1993	Andy Landis	Stranger	
"The Day I Fall in Love"	1993	James Ingram	Beethoven's 2nd	
"You've Lost That Lovin' Feelin'"	1993	Neil Diamond	Up on the Roof: Songs from the Brill Building	
"If You Ain't Got Love"	1993	—N/a	The Beverly Hillbillies	
"Billy Dale"	1993	Asleep at the Wheel	Tribute to the Music of Bob Wills and the Texas Playboys	
"When You Tell Me That You Love Me"	1994	Julio Iglesias	Crazy	
"Everyone But Me and You"	1994	Mac Davis	Will Write Songs for Food	
"You Gotta Be My Baby"	1994	—N/a	Red Hot + Country	
"Where Grass Won't Grow"	1994	George Jones, Emmylou Harris, and Trisha Yearwood	The Bradley Barn Sessions	
"The Blues Ain't Workin' on Me"	1996	Rhonda Vincent	Trouble Free	
"Knockin' on Heaven's Door"	1997	Ladysmith Black Mambazo	Heavenly	
"Silent Night"	1997	—N/a	Annabelle's Wish	
"Something Bigger Than Me"	1997	—N/a	Annabelle's Wish	
"Sleepless Nights"	1998	The Nobles	Slow Glowin' Dream	
"Wrong Direction Home"	1998	Margo O'Donnell and Maura O'Connell	The Highway of My Life: Shade of the Family Tree	
"God's Coloring Book"	1998	Margo O'Donnell	The Highway of My Life: Shade of the Family Tree	
"Dreaming My Dreams with You"	1999	Alison Krauss	Forget About It	
"Satisfied"	1999	Vestal Goodman	Vestal & Friends	
"Smoky Mountain Memories"	2000	Bryan Sutton	Ready to Go	
"Making Plans"	2000	Johnny Russell	Actin' Naturally	
"Born for You / Circle Game"	2000	Kathie Lee Gifford	Born for You	
"Only My Pillow Knows"	2000	Kathie Lee Gifford	Born for You	
"Cry, Cry Darlin'"	2000	Ricky Skaggs	Big Mon: The Songs of Bill Monroe	
"Healing Hands"	2000	Sonya Isaacs	Sonya Isaacs	
"Touch of a Dove"	2000	Brian Waldschlager	Down There	
"Heart Door"	2001	Paula Cole	Sweet November	
"When Love Is New"	2001	Emmy Rossum	Songcatcher	
"Send Me the Pillow You Dream On"	2001	Hank Locklin	Generations in Song	
"Two of the Lucky Ones"	2001	Hal Ketchum	Lucky Man	
"Loving You Too Well"	2001	Ralph Stanley	Clinch Mountain Sweethearts	
"The Pretty Young Girl"	2002	Altan	The Blue Idol	
"I'll Never Say Goodbye"	2002	The Stevens Sisters	Little by Little	
"Violet and a Rose"	2002	Pam Tillis	It's All Relative: Tillis Sings Tillis	
"Falling Out of Love with Me"	2002	Pinmonkey	Pinmonkey	
"Once Upon a Christmas"	2002	Selah	Rose of Bethlehem	
"Bluegrass, White Snow"	2002	Patty Loveless and Ricky Skaggs	Bluegrass & White Snow: A Mountain Christmas	
"Dixie Darling"	2002	Arlo Guthrie	Banjoman: A Tribute to Derroll Adams	
"Leave That Cowboy Alone"	2003	Ray Benson	Beyond Time	
"Slowly I'm Falling to Pieces"	2003	Paul Brewster	Everybody's Talkin'	
"Steady as the Rain"	2003	The Larkins	The Larkins	
"Stand by the River"	2003	Dottie Rambo	Stand by the River	
"Undercover"	2003	Kenny Rogers	Back to the Well	
"The Angels Rejoiced"	2003	Sonya Isaacs	Livin', Lovin', Losin': Songs of the Louvin Brothers	
"Coat of Many Colors"	2003	Shania Twain and Alison Krauss & Union Station	Just Because I'm a Woman: Songs of Dolly Parton	
"Just Because I'm a Woman"	2003	—N/a	Just Because I'm a Woman: Songs of Dolly Parton	
"High and Mighty"	2003	Aaron Crisler	In Good Hands	
"Jolene"	2004	Mindy Smith	One Moment More	
"Creepin' In"	2004	Norah Jones	Feels Like Home	
"My Tennessee Hills"	2004	Janis Ian	Billie's Bones	
"Thank God I'm a Country Boy"	2004	Roy Rivers	Thank God I'm a Country Boy	
"Slippin' Around"	2004	Floyd Tillman	The Influence	
"Angels and Eagles"	2004	Kim McLean	Happy Face	
"Christmas Time's a Comin'"	2004	—N/a	Christmas Grass, Vol. 2	
"It Looked Good on Paper"	2004	Randy Kohrs	I'm Torn	
"Baby, It's Cold Outside"	2004	Rod Stewart	Stardust: The Great American Songbook, Volume III	
"Viva Las Vegas"	2005	The Grascals	The Grascals	
"If I Said You Had a Beautiful Body (Would You Hold It Against Me)"	2005	The Bellamy Brothers	Angels & Outlaws, Volume 1	
"Cold"	2005	Darrell Webb	Behind the Scenes	
"I Will Always Love You" (Note: Jerry Doyle, formerly known as Jerry D, began going by the name Eirinn Abú in 2011. He recycled Dolly’s vocal take from this 2005 recording of "I Will Always Love You" on his two 2011 albums Forever in Love and A New Creation, each featuring a different musical arrangement. He re-released Sax in the Country under his new name in 2020.)	2005	Jerry D	Sax in the Country	
"When I Get Where I'm Going"	2005	Brad Paisley	Time Well Wasted	
"Cornography"	2005	Brad Paisley, James Burton, and the Kung Pao Buckaroos (Note: The Kung Pao Buckaroos are George Jones, Little Jimmy Dickens, and Bill Anderson, with Dolly Parton as Miss Kitty.)	Time Well Wasted	
"The Blues Man"	2005	George Jones	Hits I Missed...And One I Didn't	
"Silent Night"	2005	Billy Dean	The Christ (A Song for Joseph)	
"I Still Miss Someone"	2005	Martina McBride	Timeless	
"Train, Train"	2005	Eric Lee Beddingfield	Eric Lee Beddingfield	
"Travelin' Thru"	2006	—N/a	Transamerica	
"Heartbreaker's Alibi"	2006	Rhonda Vincent	All American Bluegrass Girl	
"Circle of Friends"	2006	Charlie Louvin and Alison Krauss	If Only in a Song	
"Beneath the Sweet Magnolia Tree"	2006	Christie Lynn and Porter Wagoner	Christie Lynn Sings Country • Gospel • Bluegrass	
"Tomorrow Is Forever"	2006	Solomon Burke	Nashville	
"God's Coloring Book"	2006	Charley Pride	Pride and Joy: A Gospel Music Collection	
"Jolene" (Live)	2006	—N/a	Grand Ole Opry Live Classics: Ladies of the Grand Ole Opry	
"My Tennessee Mountain Home" (Live)	2006	—N/a	Rare Country Legends Live	
"The Last Thing on My Mind" (Live)	2006	Porter Wagoner	Rare Country Legends Live	
"Touch Your Woman" (Live)	2006	—N/a	Rare Country Legends Live	
"This Old House"	2007	Brenda Lee	Gospel Duets with Treasured Friends	
"River of Happiness"	2007	—N/a	I'll Fly Away: Gospel Hymns & Songs of Faith	
"Drifting Too Far from the Shore"	2007	Porter Wagoner	Best of Grand Ole Gospel 2008	
"Palms of Victory"	2007	Emmylou Harris and Linda Ronstadt	Songbird: Rare Tracks and Forgotten Gems	
"Softly and Tenderly"	2007	Emmylou Harris and Linda Ronstadt	Songbird: Rare Tracks and Forgotten Gems	
"Daddy's Old Fiddle"	2007	The Charlie Daniels Band	Deuces	
"Love Is Like a Butterfly"	2007	Deana Carter	The Chain	
"My Perfect Reason"	2007	Bill Anderson	Whisperin’ Bluegrass	
"Gold"	2008	Emmylou Harris and Vince Gill	All I Intended to Be	
"To Daddy"	2008	Tom Astor	Alles klar - kein Problem!	
"Rockin' Years"	2008	George Jones	Burn Your Playhouse Down: The Unreleased Duets	
"Do You Know"	2008	Jessica Simpson	Do You Know	
"Fisherman's Song"	2008	—N/a	Born to the Breed: A Tribute to Judy Collins	
"Applejack"	2008	Pam Gadd	Benefit of Doubt	
"Narrative Intro: A Bridge Across"	2008	—N/a	This Is My America	
"A Bridge Across"	2008	Mark O’Connor and the Nashville Symphony	This Is My America	
"Boots and Sand"	2009	Yusuf and Paul McCartney	Roadsinger	
"Pretty Flowers"	2009	Steve Martin and Vince Gill	The Crow: New Songs for the Five-String Banjo	
"I Will Always Love You"	2009	Stephanie J. Block	This Place I Know	
"The Bright Blue Rose"	2009	Maura O'Connell	Naked with Friends	
"Tell Me That You Love Me"	2009	Kenny Rogers	The First 50 Years	
"The Right Time"	2010	Brother Clyde	Brother Clyde	
"Made for Lovin' You"	2010	Curly Putman	Write 'em Sad - Sing 'em Lonesome	
"In the Garden by the Fountain"	2010	Rhonda Vincent	Taken	
"Pain of Lovin' You"	2011	The Grascals	Country Classics with a Bluegrass Spin	
"I Am Strong"	2011	The Grascals	Country Classics with a Bluegrass Spin	
"I Am Strong"	2011	The Grascals, The Oak Ridge Boys, Darryl Worley, Charlie Daniels, Terri Clark, Randy Owen, Steven Seagal, Tom T. Hall, Joe Nichols, and Ashley McLaurin	Country Classics with a Bluegrass Spin	
"Wonderful Christmas Time"	2011	Chicago	Chicago XXXIII: O Christmas Three	
"True Blue"	2011	Isabelle Boulay	Les grands espaces	
"If It's All the Same to You"	2011	Bill Anderson	The First 10 Years: 1956—1966	
"I Will Always Love You" (Note: Jerry Doyle, formerly known as Jerry D, began going by the name Eirinn Abú in 2011. He recycled Dolly’s vocal take from his 2005 recording of "I Will Always Love You" from the Sax in the County album on his two 2011 albums Forever in Love and A New Creation, each featuring a different musical arrangement.)	2011	Eirinn Abú	Forever in Love	
"I Will Always Love You" (Note: Jerry Doyle, formerly known as Jerry D, began going by the name Eirinn Abú in 2011. He recycled Dolly’s vocal take from his 2005 recording of "I Will Always Love You" from the Sax in the County album on his two 2011 albums Forever in Love and A New Creation, each featuring a different musical arrangement.)	2011	Eirinn Abú	A New Creation	
"I Will Always Love You"	2012	Lulu Roman	At Last	
"It's Too Late"	2013	—N/a	Unsung Hero: A Tribute to the Music of Ron Davies	
"Do I Love You (Yes in Every Way)"	2013	Paul Anka	Duets	
"Jolene"	2013	Straight No Chaser	Under the Influence	
"You Can't Make Old Friends"	2013	Kenny Rogers	You Can't Make Old Friends	
"From Here to the Moon and Back"	2013	Willie Nelson	To All the Girls...	
"Listen to the Mockingbird"	2013	Stuart Duncan	Divided & United: The Songs of the Civil War	
"Jolene"	2014	Mary Sarah	Bridges	
"When They Ring Those Golden Bells"	2015	—N/a	Orthophonic Joy: The 1927 Bristol Sessions Revisited	
"Jolene" (Slowdown) (Note: This is a slowed down version of Parton's 1974 recording of "Jolene".)	2015	—N/a	The Blacklist	
"My Father's Daughter"	2015	Jewel	Picking Up the Pieces	
"Beyond the Call"	2015	James Rogers	Beyond the Call	
"When I Stop Dreaming"	2015	Don Henley	Cass County	
"Twelve Days of Christmas"	2015	Rhonda Vincent, Charlie Daniels, The Oak Ridge Boys, Ronnie Milsap, Gene Watson, Bill Anderson, Larry Gatlin, Jeannie Seely, Lorrie Morgan, and Pam Tillis	Christmas Time	
"More Power to Ya"	2016	Stella Parton	Mountain Songbird	
"Little Rosewood Casket"	2016	—N/a	On Top of Old Smoky: New Old-Time Smoky Mountain Music	
"I Will Always Love You"	2017	Michael Bolton	Songs of Cinema	
"The Story"	2017	—N/a	Cover Stories	
"Jolene"	2017	Pentatonix	PTX, Vol. IV: Classics	
"Born Again Wildflower"	2017	Debbie Cochran	Born Again Wildflower	
"Old Flames (Can't Hold a Candle to You)"	2017	Kesha	Rainbow	
"Rainbowland"	2017	Miley Cyrus	Younger Now	
"Appalachian Memories"	2017	Brad Hudson	Next New Heartbreak	
"Please"	2018	Rhonda Vincent	Restoration: Reimagining the Songs of Elton John and Bernie Taupin	
"Something More"	2018	—N/a	1927 Jubilee: The New Bristol Sessions	
"The Last Word in Lonesome Is Me"	2018	Alison Krauss	King of the Road: A Tribute to Roger Miller	
"King of the Road"	2018	Willie Nelson, Merle Haggard, Kris Kristofferson, Eric Church, Randy Travis, Lily Meola, Dwight Yoakam, Bill Anderson, Glen Phillips (Toad the Wet Sprocket), Radney Foster, Emmylou Harris, Jamey Johnson, Alison Krauss, Ronnie Dunn, Flatt Lonesome, Dean Miller, Shawn Camp, Mandy Barnett, and Brenda Lee	King of the Road: A Tribute to Roger Miller	
"19th Amendment (A Woman's Right)"	2018	—N/a	27: The Most Perfect Album	
"Road to Bethlehem"	2018	Dailey & Vincent	The Sounds of Christmas	
"The Carroll County Accident"	2018	Buck Trent	Spartanburg Blues	
"Smoky Mountain Rain"	2019	Ronnie Milsap	The Duets	
"I Will Always Love You"	2019	Kristin Chenoweth	For the Girls	
"There Was Jesus"	2019	Zach Williams	Rescue Story	
"Happy All The Time"	2019	Sam Williams	Glasshouse Children	
"Faith"	2020	Galantis and Mr. Probz	Church	
"Applejack"	2020	Linda Feller	35 Jahre: Das Jubiläumsalbum	
"Words"	2021	Barry Gibb	Greenfields: The Gibb Brothers' Songbook, Vol. 1	
"Where the Soul Never Dies"	2021	Leslie Jordan	Company's Comin'	
"One Angel"	2021	Rory Feek	Gentle Man	
"9 to 5 to 9" (Note: Parton's appearance on this recording is a sample of her 1980 version of "9 to 5". This sample is significant because Sabyn is one of Randy Parton's children and Dolly's nephew.)	2021	Sabyn	Halfway There	
"Happy All the Time"	2021	Sam Williams	Glasshouse Children	
"In the Sweet By and By"	2021	Larry Cordle, Carl Jackson, Jerry Salley, and Bradley Walker	Country Faith Bluegrass	
"Does He Love You"	2021	Reba McEntire	Revived Remixed Revisited	
"Eagle When She Flies"	2021	José Feliciano	Behind This Guitar	
"Love Is Here to Stay"	2022	Michael Feinstein	Gershwin Country	
"The Seeker"	2022	Julie and Dan	Hymns: Some of Old, Some of New	
"You Can't Make Old Friends" (Live)	2022	Kenny Rogers	All in for the Gambler	
"I Will Always Love You" (Live)	2022	—N/a	All in for the Gambler	
"Islands in the Stream" (Live)	2022	Kenny Rogers	All in for the Gambler	
"Someday It'll All Make Sense"	2022	Bill Anderson	As Far as I Can See: The Best of Bill Anderson	
"Two Doors Down"	2022	Positive Vibrations	Country Goes Reggae	
"In Time, Jubilation"	2022	Appalachian Road Show	Jubilation	
"Dolly P"	2024	Beyoncé	Cowboy Carter	
"Tyrant"	2024	Beyoncé	Cowboy Carter	
