= The Complete Trio Collection =

Compilation album by Dolly Parton, Emmylou Harris and Linda Ronstadt
- Released: September 9, 2016
- Recorded: Los Angeles, California, 1978 – 1998
- Genre: Country
- Length: 146:22
- Labels: Rhino, Warner Bros. Nashville, Asylum
- Producers: Emmylou Harris, James Austin

Dolly Parton, Emmylou Harris and Linda Ronstadt chronology
Trio II (1999)	The Complete Trio Collection (2016)

Dolly Parton chronology
Pure & Simple (2016)	The Complete Trio Collection (2016)	I Believe in You (2017)

Emmylou Harris chronology
The Traveling Kind (2015)	The Complete Trio Collection (2016)	Ramble in Music City: The Lost Concert (2021)

Singles from The Complete Trio Collection
- 1. "Do I Ever Cross Your Mind (Alternate Take 1994)" Released: March 28, 2016; 2. "Wildflowers (Alternate Take 1986)" Released: August 3, 2016; 3. "Calling My Children Home" Released: August 12, 2016; 4. "Waltz Across Texas Tonight" Released: August 24, 2016

The Complete Trio Collection is compilation album by American singer-songwriters Dolly Parton, Emmylou Harris and Linda Ronstadt. It brings together newly remastered versions of their two award-winning albums, 1987's Trio and 1999's Trio II, with a third disc compiling 20 alternate takes and unreleased material. It was released worldwide on September 9, 2016, by Rhino Entertainment. A stand-alone version of the third disc, titled Farther Along, was released separately on vinyl.

Despite being touted as "complete", the set is missing three recordings that feature the trio. Those three tracks are:

- "Light of the Stable" – recorded and released as a single in 1975 featuring additional harmony vocals from Neil Young, it was also included on Harris' 1979 album of the same name.
- "Evangeline" – recorded in 1978 and featured on Harris' 1981 album of the same name, along with "Mr. Sandman", which is included on this set.
- "Palms of Victory" – recorded in 1978, this track went unreleased until Harris' 2007 compilation album Songbird: Rare Tracks and Forgotten Gems, along with "Softly and Tenderly", which does appear on this set.

Additionally, Parton and Ronstadt both provided harmony vocals on various tracks throughout Harris' 1985 album The Ballad of Sally Rose. The three also performed together on TV in the 1970s.

== History ==
Longtime friends and admirers of one another, Parton, Ronstadt and Harris first attempted to record an album together in the mid-1970s, but scheduling conflicts and other difficulties (including the fact that the three women all recorded for different record labels) prevented its release. Finally a collaboration effort went to full fruition, being produced by George Massenburg. When Trio was released in early 1987, it spawned four huge country hit singles – including the country No. 1 remake of the Phil Spector-penned 1958 hit by The Teddy Bears, "To Know Him Is To Love Him". The album hit No. 1 on the U.S. country albums chart – where it held for five consecutive weeks – and No. 6 on the main Billboard album chart. It won the Grammy Award for Best Country Performance by a Duo or Group with Vocal. It was also nominated for the Album of the Year Grammy alongside Michael Jackson, U2, Prince and Whitney Houston, as well as best country song for "Telling Me Lies". It was certified Platinum by the Recording Industry Association of America.

A dozen years after the release of their multi-Platinum, Grammy-winning Trio album, the country music supergroup returned with another in the same vein. Five of the ten tracks on this album first appeared on Linda Ronstadt's 1995 album Feels Like Home, minus Parton's vocals. These five tracks were "Lover's Return", "High Sierra", a cover of Neil Young's "After the Gold Rush" (with Valerie Carter and string arrangements by David Campbell), "The Blue Train" (a Top 40 solo hit for Ronstadt), and the title song to the Ronstadt album, the Randy Newman-composed "Feels Like Home". The Gold-selling album reached the Top Five on Billboard's Country Albums chart, as well as No. 62 on Billboard's main album listing.

The songs were actually recorded in 1994 by Parton, Ronstadt and Harris, but label disputes and conflicting schedules of the three women prevented its release at the time. Eventually, Ronstadt remixed the five above-mentioned tracks (sans Parton's vocals) to include in Feels Like Home. In 1999 (after Parton and Harris had parted ways with their respective labels), they decided to finally release the album as originally recorded. Though it yielded no hit singles (mainstream U.S. country radio had long since dropped most artists approaching, or over, the age of 50 from their playlists by the late 1990s), Trio II was certified Gold by the RIAA and won the trio another Grammy Award in 2000.

== Track listing ==
Disc 1: Trio (1987)
No.	Title	Writer(s)	Length
1.	"The Pain of Loving You"	Dolly Parton, Porter Wagoner	2:32
2.	"Making Plans"	Johnny Russell, Voni Morrison	3:36
3.	"To Know Him Is to Love Him"	Phil Spector	3:48
4.	"Hobo's Meditation"	Jimmie Rodgers	3:17
5.	"Wildflowers"	Dolly Parton	3:33
6.	"Telling Me Lies"	Linda Thompson, Betsy Cook	4:26
7.	"My Dear Companion"	Traditional; arr. Jean Ritchie	2:55
8.	"Those Memories of You"	Alan O'Bryant	3:58
9.	"I've Had Enough"	Kate McGarrigle	3:30
10.	"Rosewood Casket"	Traditional; arr. Avie Lee Parton	2:59
11.	"Farther Along"	Traditional; arr. John Starling, Emmylou Harris	4:10
Total length:			38:53

Disc 2: Trio II (1999)
No.	Title	Writer(s)	Length
1.	"Lover's Return"	A.P. Carter, Maybelle Carter, Sara Carter	4:00
2.	"High Sierra"	Harley Allen	4:21
3.	"Do I Ever Cross Your Mind?"	Dolly Parton	3:16
4.	"After the Gold Rush"	Neil Young	3:31
5.	"The Blue Train"	Jennifer Kimball, Tom Kimmel	4:57
6.	"I Feel the Blues Movin' In"	Del McCoury	4:31
7.	"You'll Never Be the Sun"	Donagh Long	4:43
8.	"He Rode All the Way to Texas"	John Starling	3:07
9.	"Feels Like Home"	Randy Newman	4:47
10.	"When We're Gone, Long Gone"	Kieran Kane, James Paul O'Hara	4:00
Total length:			41:18

Disc 3: Unreleased & Alternate Takes, etc.
No.	Title	Writer(s)	Length
1.	"Wildflowers" (Alternate Take 1986)	Dolly Parton	3:37
2.	"Waltz Across Texas Tonight" (Unreleased 1994)	Emmylou Harris, Rodney Crowell	3:49
3.	"Lovers Return" (Alternate Mix 1994)	A.P. Carter, Maybelle Carter, Sara Carter	4:00
4.	"Softly and Tenderly" (Unreleased 1994)	Traditional	5:29
5.	"Pleasant as May" (Unreleased 1986)	Dolly Parton	2:34
6.	"My Dear Companion" (Alternate Take 1986)	Jean Ritchie	2:58
7.	"My Blue Tears" (Unreleased 1998)	Dolly Parton	2:41
8.	"Making Plans" (Alternate Take 1986)	Johnny Russell, Voni Morrison	3:40
9.	"I've Had Enough" (Alternate Mix 1986)	Kate McGarrigle	3:30
10.	"Grey Funnel Line" (Unreleased 1986)	Cyril Tawney	2:11
11.	"You Don't Knock" (Unreleased 1986)	Roebuck Staples, Wesley Westbrooks	3:17
12.	"Where Will the Words Come From?" (Unreleased 1985)	Sonny Curtis, Glen D. Hardin	2:53
13.	"Do I Ever Cross Your Mind?" (Alternate Take 1994)	Dolly Parton	3:33
14.	"Are You Tired of Me?" (Unreleased 1986)	A.P. Carter	2:36
15.	"Even Cowgirls Get the Blues"	Rodney Crowell	3:56
16.	"Mr. Sandman"	Pat Ballard	2:20
17.	"Handful of Dust" (Unreleased 1993)	Tony Arata	2:20
18.	"Calling My Children Home" (Unreleased 1986)	Doyle Lawson, Charles Waller, Robert Yates	3:13
19.	"In a Deep Sleep" (Unreleased 1986)	Tríona Ní Dhomhnaill	2:52
20.	"Farther Along" (Alternate Mix 1986)	Traditional; arr. John Starling, Emmylou Harris	4:04
Total length:			66:11

- "Softly and Tenderly" was previously released on Harris' 2007 compilation Songbird: Rare Tracks and Forgotten Gems.
- While the album liner notes state "My Blue Tears" is an unreleased recording from 1998, it is actually a recording from 1978 that was originally released on Ronstadt's 1982 album Get Closer.
- "Even Cowgirls Get the Blues" was previously released on Harris' 1977 album Blue Kentucky Girl, however the version included in this set has Ronstadt and Parton sharing the verses with Harris, whereas in the original album they merely sang the harmony.
- "Mr. Sandman" was previously released on Harris' 1981 album Evangeline.

== Charts ==
=== Weekly charts ===
Chart (2016)	Peak position
Australian Albums (ARIA)	3
Belgian Albums (Ultratop Flanders)	64
Belgian Albums (Ultratop Wallonia)	137
Dutch Albums (Album Top 100)	12
Irish Albums (IRMA)	81
New Zealand Heatseekers Albums (RMNZ)	5
Scottish Albums (Official Charts)	24
Swiss Albums (Schweizer Hitparade)	58
UK Albums (Official Charts)	47
UK Country Compilations	1
US Billboard 200	124
US Top Country Albums (Billboard)	7

=== Year-end charts ===
Chart (2016)	Position
Australian Albums (ARIA)	52
