= White Line (Emmylou Harris song) =

Single by Emmylou Harris

from the album The Ballad of Sally Rose
- B-side: "Light of the Stable"
- Released: January 1985
- Recorded: May 1984
- Studio: Treasure Isle Recorders
- Genre: Country
- Length: 3:43
- Label: Warner Bros.
- Songwriter(s): Emmylou Harris; Paul Kennerley
- Producer(s): Paul Kennerley

Emmylou Harris singles chronology
"Someone Like You" (1984)	"White Line" (1985)	"Timberline" (1985)

"White Line" is a song co-written and recorded by American singer Emmylou Harris. It was released in January 1985 as the lead single from Harris' album The Ballad of Sally Rose, which was her first of entirely self-composed material. "White Line" was a top 20 US country song and reached the top ten of the Canadian country chart. Harris wrote the song along with her then-husband Paul Kennerley.

== Background and recording ==
Emmylou Harris had achieved commercial success using a country rock style adapted from her mentor Gram Parsons. For many years, she had commercial success collaborating with her producer (and then-husband) Brian Ahern. However, the couple divorced in the mid-1980s. Harris began her next studio album The Ballad of Sally Rose. It was Harris' first album that was entirely written or co-written by her. She received support from Paul Kennerley, who produced the project too. The pair would also marry. The first single off the album was "White Line", which was co-written by Harris and Kennerley. The song was recorded at Treasure Isle Recorders, a studio located in Nashville, Tennessee.

== Release, chart performance and reception ==
"White Line" became the lead single for Harris' The Ballad of Sally Rose. It was issued by Warner Bros. Records in January 1985. It was backed on the B-side by the song "Long Tall Sally Rose". The single was distributed as a seven-inch vinyl single. "Drivin' Wheel" debuted on the US Billboard Hot Country Songs chart in March 1985. It spent 17 weeks there, reaching the number 14 position in June 1985. The song was more commercially successful on the Canadian RPM Country Tracks chart, peaking at the number six position in 1985. "White Line" was the only single to reach positions inside the US and Canadian country top 40. The album's second and third singles charted but failed to peak within the top 40 in both countries. Although no formal review was provided, Cashbox magazine named "White Line" one of their "Programmers Picks" in March 1985.

== Track listing ==
7" vinyl single

- "White Line" – 3:43
- "Long Tall Sally Rose" – 1:35

== Chart performance ==
Chart (1985)	Peak position
Canada Country Singles (RPM)	6
US Hot Country Songs (Billboard)	14
