= The Very Best of Emmylou Harris: Heartaches & Highways =

Compilation album by Emmylou Harris
- Released: July 19, 2005
- Genre: Country
- Labels: Rhino; Warner Bros. Records

Emmylou Harris chronology
Stumble into Grace (2003)	The Very Best of Emmylou Harris: Heartaches & Highways (2005)	All the Roadrunning (2006)

Professional ratings
Review scores
Source	Rating
AllMusic	4.5/5 stars

The Very Best of Emmylou Harris: Heartaches & Highways is a compilation album by American country music artist Emmylou Harris. It was released by Rhino Records on July 19, 2005. The album peaked at number 23 on the Billboard Top Country Albums chart.

== Track listing ==
No.	Title	Writer(s)	Length
1.	"Love Hurts" (with Gram Parsons)	Boudleaux Bryant	3:40
2.	"Boulder to Birmingham"	Bill Danoff, Emmylou Harris	3:34
3.	"Making Believe"	Jimmy Work	3:37
4.	"Pancho and Lefty"	Townes Van Zandt	4:50
5.	"One of These Days"	Earl Montgomery	3:04
6.	"(Lost His Love) On Our Last Date"	Floyd Cramer, Conway Twitty	3:32
7.	"Born to Run"	Paul Kennerley	3:45
8.	"Beneath Still Waters"	Dallas Frazier	3:44
9.	"If I Could Only Win Your Love" (with Herb Pedersen)	Charlie Louvin, Ira Louvin	2:36
10.	"Together Again"	Buck Owens	3:54
11.	"That Lovin' You Feelin' Again" (with Roy Orbison)	Roy Orbison, Chris Price	4:10
12.	"To Know Him Is to Love Him" (with Dolly Parton and Linda Ronstadt)	Phil Spector	3:51
13.	"Two More Bottles of Wine"	Delbert McClinton	3:07
14.	"Wayfaring Stranger"	Traditional	3:27
15.	"Calling My Children Home"	Doyle Lawson, Charles Waller, Robert Yates	3:10
16.	"Green Pastures"	Traditional	3:11
17.	"Orphan Girl"	Gillian Welch	3:16
18.	"Michelangelo"	Harris	5:14
19.	"Here I Am"	Harris	3:49
20.	"The Connection"	Jack Routh, Randy Sharp	5:29
Total length:			75:00

== Chart performance ==
Chart (2005)	Peak position
U.S. Billboard Top Country Albums	23
U.S. Billboard 200	133

== Release history ==
Release history and formats for The Very Best of Emmylou Harris: Heartaches & Highways
Region	Date	Format	Label	Ref.
North America	January 1, 1994	CD	Warner Bros. Records	
