= If I Could Only Win Your Love =

Single by Emmylou Harris

from the album Pieces of the Sky
- B-side: "Queen of the Silver Dollar"
- Released: June 1975
- Genre: Country
- Length: 2:36
- Label: Reprise
- Songwriter(s): Charlie Louvin, Ira Louvin
- Producer(s): Brian Ahern

Emmylou Harris singles chronology
"Too Far Gone" (1975)	"If I Could Only Win Your Love" (1975)	"Together Again" (1976)

"If I Could Only Win Your Love" is a song written and first performed in 1958 by The Louvin Brothers and later made a hit by American country music artist Emmylou Harris. Harris and Herb Pedersen sing this as a duet, much like Charlie and his brother Ira sang it originally. It was released in June 1975 as the second single from her album Pieces of the Sky. The song peaked at number 4 on the Billboard Hot Country Singles chart. It also reached number 1 on the RPM Country Tracks chart in Canada.

== Chart performance ==
Chart (1975)	Peak position
US Hot Country Songs (Billboard)	4
US Billboard Hot 100	58
Canadian RPM Country Tracks	1
