= Red Dirt Girl =

Studio album by Emmylou Harris
- Released: September 12, 2000
- Recorded: March–April 2000
- Studios: Clouet Street Studio, New Orleans
- Genres: Country folk, Americana
- Length: 55:59
- Label: Nonesuch
- Producer: Malcolm Burn

Emmylou Harris chronology
Western Wall: The Tucson Sessions (1999)	Red Dirt Girl (2000)	Stumble into Grace (2003)

Red Dirt Girl is the nineteenth studio album by American country artist Emmylou Harris, released on September 12, 2000 by Nonesuch Records. The album was a significant departure for Harris, as eleven of the twelve tracks were written or co-written by her. At the time, she was best known for covering other songwriters' work. Prior to this album, only two of Harris' LPs had more than two of her own compositions (Gliding Bird in 1969, and The Ballad of Sally Rose in 1985). Her next album, Stumble into Grace, was also written by Harris. The album contains "Bang the Drum Slowly", a song Guy Clark helped Harris write as an elegy for her father. The album peaked at number 3 on the Billboard country album charts and won the Grammy Award for Best Contemporary Folk Album in 2001.

== Reception ==
Professional ratings
Aggregate scores
Source	Rating
Metacritic	73/100
Review scores
Source	Rating
AllMusic	4/5 stars
Entertainment Weekly	A
The Guardian	4/5 stars
The Independent	4/5 stars
Los Angeles Times	3.5/4 stars
Q	4/5 stars
Rolling Stone	2.5/5 stars
Spin	4/10
Uncut	5/5 stars
The Village Voice	C

The album was very positively received, being declared "spellbinding" by The Guardian, while the New York Times wrote: "Miss Harris has found herself."

The album was included in the book 1001 Albums You Must Hear Before You Die, which describes it thus:

“drum loops and middle eastern melodies nestle in comfortably next to warm guitar work and Harris' gently wavering voice... a big departure from her rootsy '70s releases.”

== Track listing ==
All tracks are written by Emmylou Harris, except where noted.

No.	Title	Writer(s)	Length
1.	"The Pearl"		5:02
2.	"Michelangelo"		5:15
3.	"I Don't Wanna Talk About It Now"		4:47
4.	"Tragedy"	Emmylou Harris; Rodney Crowell	4:25
5.	"Red Dirt Girl"		4:19
6.	"My Baby Needs a Shepherd"		4:40
7.	"Bang the Drum Slowly"	Emmylou Harris; Guy Clark	4:51
8.	"J'Ai Fait Tout"	Emmylou Harris; Jill Cunniff; Daryl Johnson	5:32
9.	"One Big Love"	Patty Griffin; Angelo Petraglia	4:34
10.	"Hour of Gold"		5:01
11.	"My Antonia"		3:44
12.	"Boy from Tupelo"		3:49

- Track information and Personnel credits taken from the album's liner notes.

== Personnel ==
1. "The Pearl"

- Emmylou Harris: Acoustic guitar
- Malcolm Burn: Bass
- Ethan Johns: Electric guitar
- Daryl Johnson: Drums, bass, percussion, harmony vocals
- Buddy Miller: Electric guitar

2. "Michelangelo"

- Emmylou Harris: Acoustic guitar
- Malcolm Burn: Bass, Drum box programming
- Ethan Johns: Electric guitar

3. "I Don't Wanna Talk About It Now"

- Emmylou Harris: Acoustic guitar
- Malcolm Burn: Piano, electric guitar, tambourine
- Jill Cunniff: Electric guitar, bass, harmony vocals
- Ethan Johns: Drums
- Daryl Johnson: Bass, harmony vocals
- Julie Miller: harmony vocals

4. "Tragedy"

- Emmylou Harris: Baritone electric Guitar
- Malcolm Burn: Piano, 12-string guitar, bass, Fender Rhodes, drum box programming
- Ethan Johns: Electric guitar
- Daryl Johnson: Chord bass
- Buddy Miller: Pedal steel
- Patti Scialfa: Duet vocal
- Bruce Springsteen: Harmony vocals

5. "Red Dirt Girl"

- Emmylou Harris: Acoustic guitar
- Malcolm Burn: Bass, electric guitar, drum box programming
- Ethan Johns: Omnichord
- Daryl Johnson: Percussion, bass pedals
- Buddy Miller: Electric guitar

6. "My Baby Needs A Shepherd"

- Emmylou Harris: Acoustic guitar
- Malcolm Burn: Electric guitar, percussion, dulcimer, drum box programming
- Ethan Johns: Baritone electric guitar, percussion
- René Coman: Bass
- Patty Griffin: Harmony vocals
- Daryl Johnson: Baritone acoustic guitar, percussion

7. "Bang The Drum Slowly"

- Emmylou Harris: Baritone electric guitar, acoustic guitar
- Malcolm Burn: Piano, synth bass, electric guitar
- Ethan Johns: EBow
- Daryl Johnson: Bass. harmony vocals, percussion

8. "J'Ai Fait Tout"

- Malcolm Burn: Acoustic guitar, electric guitar
- Jill Cunniff: Bass, harmony vocals, electric guitar
- Ethan Johns: Drums
- Daryl Johnson: Bass, harmony vocals
- Kate McGarrigle: Accordion
- Jim Watts: Fender Rhodes

9. "One Big Love"

- Malcolm Burn: Bass, 12-string guitar, drum box programming, harmony vocals
- John Deaderick: Fender Rhodes
- Ethan Johns: Electric guitar, drums
- Buddy Miller: Electric guitar, mando guitar
- Julie Miller: Harmony vocals
- Jill Cunniff: Harmony vocals
- Carlo Nuccio: Drums

10. "Hour Of Gold"

- Emmylou Harris: Acoustic guitar
- Malcolm Burn: Fender Rhodes, synth
- Patty Griffin: Harmony vocals
- Ethan Johns: Mando cello
- Daryl Johnson: Bass

11. "My Antonia"

- Emmylou Harris: Baritone electric guitar
- Malcolm Burn: Harmonica, acoustic guitar, omnichord, synth bass
- Ethans Johns: Acoustic guitar, mando cello
- Daryl Johnson: Bass, percussion
- Dave Matthews: Duet vocal
- Buddy Miller: Pedal steel, electric guitar

12. "Boy From Tupelo"

- Emmylou Harris: Acoustic guitar
- Malcolm Burn: Bass, percussion, piano, electric guitar, drums
- Ethan Johns: EBow, acoustic guitar
- Kate McGarrigle: Piano, harmony vocals
- Julie Miller: Harmony vocals

== Charts ==
=== Weekly charts ===
Chart (2000–01)	Peak position
Australian Albums (ARIA Charts)	93
Canadian Albums (RPM)	29
Canadian Country Albums (RPM)	3
US Billboard 200	54
US Top Country Albums (Billboard)	5

=== Year-end charts ===
Chart (2000)	Position
US Top Country Albums (Billboard)	58
Chart (2001)	Position
US Top Country Albums (Billboard)	40

== Release history ==
Release history and formats for Red Dirt Girl
Region	Date	Format	Label	Ref.
North America	September 12, 2000	CD; cassette	Nonesuch Records	
