= Roy Huskey Jr. =

Background information
- Born: Roy Milton Huskey; December 17, 1956; Nashville, Tennessee, U.S.
- Died: September 6, 1997 (aged 40) Nashville, Tennessee, U.S.
- Genres: Country
- Instrument: Upright bass
- Years active: 1971–1997
- Formerly of: Emmylou Harris, John Hartford, Chet Atkins, Garth Brooks, Johnny Cash, Vince Gill, George Jones, Steve Earle, Doc Watson, Del Wood, Roy Acuff

Roy Milton Huskey (December 17, 1956 – September 6, 1997), known professionally as Roy Huskey Jr., was a prominent American upright bass player in country music from Nashville, Tennessee. Huskey performed alongside musicians such as Chet Atkins, Garth Brooks, Johnny Cash, Vince Gill, George Jones, Steve Earle, Doc Watson and many others. His father, Roy Madison "Junior" Huskey, was also a notable bass player.

== Career ==
Huskey began his career at the age of 16 backing up Del Wood on the Grand Ole Opry in 1971. His first job as a touring musician was with Roy Acuff as one of his Smoky Mountain Boys. Eventually his work spanned a range of music styles including bluegrass, country, folk, Cajun and folk-rock.

Huskey received a Grammy with Emmylou Harris and the Nash Ramblers for their 1992 live album At the Ryman. He was also honored with a number of "Bass Player of the Year" awards from organizations such as the IBMA, SPBGMA, and ACM.

Huskey frequently performed dressed simply in a plaid shirt while smoking a cigar (often King Edward brand). He was often noted for his "rare musical intuitiveness" and late in life spoke of his ability to hear music in colors (see synesthesia).

== Death ==
Huskey died of lung cancer at Columbia Centennial Medical Center in Nashville, Tennessee, on September 6, 1997, at the age of 40. Country musician Marty Stuart told The Tennessean "Roy Huskey was a pure original state of the art, bona fide, textbook example of a bass-playing genius, truly irreplaceable."

Acoustic musician and friend John Hartford said, "In as much as the bass is the heartbeat of country music, and in as much as he was country music's most important bass player, I would say country music has just had a major heart attack."

Sam Bush recorded a tribute, "Song for Roy", with help from Jon Randall, Emmylou Harris, and Byron House. The tribute appears on Bush's 1998 album, Howlin' at the Moon. Steve Earle and The Del McCoury Band recorded the song "Pilgrim" as a tribute to Huskey on his 1999 album The Mountain. The 1999 album Trio II by Emmylou Harris, Linda Ronstadt, and Dolly Parton was dedicated to Roy. T-Bone Burnett's 2006 album "The True False Identity" is dedicated to Roy Huskey Jr.

Roy Milton Huskey was son to former bassist, Roy Madison "Junior" Huskey. Roy Milton Huskey left behind a wife, Lisa Huskey, and two sons, Taylor Huskey (1983-2006), and JT Huskey.

== Notable instruments ==
In 2006, the Country Music Hall of Fame ran an exhibit called "Big Bass Men" in tribute to Junior Huskey and Roy Huskey Jr. The display featured an upright bass—made in Czechoslovakia in the 1880s—that both father and son had used on countless recordings. Another notable instrument Huskey inherited from his father was a Gibson 1920 Style-J mando bass. The elder Huskey owned two of the Style-J instruments and had given one to Roy Acuff. The other remained in the Roy Huskey Jr. estate following his death and was on loan for a time to bass player Dave Pomeroy.
