= Thirteen (Emmylou Harris album) =

Studio album by Emmylou Harris
- Released: February 1986
- Recorded: November 1985
- Genre: Country
- Length: 32:12
- Label: Warner Bros. Nashville
- Producers: Emmylou Harris, Paul Kennerley

Emmylou Harris chronology
The Ballad of Sally Rose (1985)	Thirteen (1986)	Trio (1987)

Thirteen is an album by the American musician Emmylou Harris, released in 1986. The title came from its status as her thirteenth studio album, not counting her 1969 debut Gliding Bird, which she disowned.

The album was co-produced by Harris and her then-husband, Paul Kennerley. It became available as a CD in 2013 in a compilation issued by the Rhino Entertainment Company called Emmylou Harris Original Album Series Vol.2.

Two singles from the album were released and charted on the Hot Country Singles chart, with "If I Had My Heart Set on You" peaking at No. 60 and "Today I Started Loving You Again" peaking at No. 43. The latter was nominated for Best Female Country Vocal Performance at the 29th Annual Grammy Awards.

== Critical reception ==
Professional ratings
Review scores
Source	Rating
AllMusic	2/5 stars

The Los Angeles Times deemed Thirteen Harris's "most thoroughly satisfying studio album since 1979's Blue Kentucky Girl." The Orlando Sentinel wrote that Harris "always has been real country, in the bluegrass-mountain music branch—what she does better than any major artist is to add a measure of present to the past."

In a retrospective review for AllMusic, Jason Ankeny called Harris' cover of Bruce Springsteen's "My Father's House" "lovely", but believed the rest of the material and performances were "lackluster".

== Track listing ==
No.	Title	Writer(s)	Length
1.	"Mystery Train"	Sam Phillips, Herman "Junior" Parker	2:35
2.	"You're Free to Go"	Don Robertson, Lou Herscher	2:48
3.	"Sweetheart of the Pines"	Emmylou Harris, Paul Kennerley	3:22
4.	"Just Someone I Used to Know" (duet w/ John Anderson)	Jack Clement	2:57
5.	"My Father's House"	Bruce Springsteen	4:48
6.	"Lacassine Special"	Iry LeJeune	2:58
7.	"Today I Started Loving You Again"	Merle Haggard, Bonnie Owens	3:22
8.	"When I Was Yours"	Harris, Kennerley	2:48
9.	"I Had My Heart Set on You"	Rodney Crowell, Kennerley	3:09
10.	"Your Long Journey"	Doc Watson, Rosa Lee Watson	3:44

== Personnel ==
- Mike Bowden – bass
- Steve Cash – harmonica
- Rodney Crowell – backing vocals
- Steve Fishell – steel guitar, slide guitar, resonator guitar
- Vince Gill – backing vocals
- Carl Jackson – mandolin, fiddle, banjo, acoustic guitar, backing vocals
- Don Johnson – keyboards
- Shane Keister – synthesizer
- Mary Ann Kennedy – backing vocals
- Paul Kennerley – acoustic guitar
- Mark O'Connor – fiddle
- Frank Reckard – mandolin, electric guitar, acoustic guitar
- Pam Rose – backing vocals
- Buddy Spicher – fiddle
- Barry Tashian – backing vocals, accordion
- Steve Turner – drums, percussion
- Paul Worley – acoustic guitar
- Emmylou Harris – vocals, acoustic guitar

== Chart performance ==
Chart (1986)	Peak position
US Top Country Albums (Billboard)	9
US Billboard 200	157

== Release history ==
Release history and formats for Thirteen
Region	Date	Format	Label	Ref.
North America	February 1986	LP; CD; cassette	Warner Bros. Records	
