= All I Intended to Be =

Studio album by Emmylou Harris
- Released: June 10, 2008
- Recorded: October 16, 2005 – March 17, 2008
- Studios: Easter Island Surround, Nashville
- Genres: Country, folk, Americana
- Length: 55.25
- Label: Nonesuch
- Producer: Brian Ahern

Emmylou Harris chronology
Songbird: Rare Tracks and Forgotten Gems (2007)	All I Intended to Be (2008)	Hard Bargain (2011)

All I Intended to Be is the 25th studio album from Emmylou Harris and her third release on Nonesuch Records. It was released in the United States on June 10, 2008. The album debuted at number 22 on the Billboard 200, and number four on Top Country Albums, which makes the album Harris’ highest charting solo record on the Billboard 200 since Evangeline was released in 1981. As of 2014, it has sold 153,973 copies in the United States.

== Album information ==
Professional ratings
Review scores
Source	Rating
AllMusic	4/5 stars
The Austin Chronicle	3.5/4 stars
Billboard	(critics’ choice)
Crawdaddy!	favorable
Entertainment Weekly	(A−)
Mojo	21 May 2008
Orlando Sentinel	4/5 stars
PopMatters	7/10 stars
Q	p 103, July 2008
Slant Magazine	4/5 stars
The Times	4/5 stars
Uncut	4/5 stars

Harris stated that “Sailing Round the Room” was inspired by Terri Schiavo and is a celebration of life and death; “How She Could Sing the Wildwood Flower” refers to the relationship between A. P. and Sara Carter and was inspired by a documentary that Harris, together with Kate and Anna McGarrigle, saw on television. The song “Gold” features guest vocals by Dolly Parton and Vince Gill, while “Old Five and Dimers Like Me” and "Beyond the Great Divide" are duets with John Starling. “Moon Song” was written by Harris' close friend Patty Griffin and appeared as an iTunes bonus track on her 2007 album Children Running Through.

The album was made #49 in Q’s 50 Best Albums of the Year 2008.

The album was also nominated for a Grammy Award in the field of Best Contemporary Folk/Americana Album at the 2009 Grammy Awards.

The title is taken from the closing line of the track "Old Five and Dimers Like Me."

== Track listing ==
No.	Title	Writer(s)	Length
1.	"Shores of White Sand (Karen Brooks cover)"	Jack Wesley Routh	4:22
2.	"Hold On"	Jude Johnstone	4:35
3.	"Moon Song"	Patty Griffin	4:06
4.	"Broken Man’s Lament"	Mark Germino	5:05
5.	"Gold"	Emmylou Harris	3:32
6.	"How She Could Sing the Wildwood Flower"	Emmylou Harris, Kate McGarrigle, Anna McGarrigle	3:44
7.	"All That You Have Is Your Soul (Tracy Chapman cover)"	Tracy Chapman	4:41
8.	"Take That Ride"	Emmylou Harris	3:39
9.	"Old Five and Dimers Like Me (Tom T. Hall & Billy Joe Shaver cover)"	Billy Joe Shaver	4:16
10.	"Kern River"	Merle Haggard	4:03
11.	"Not Enough"	Emmylou Harris	3:25
12.	"Sailing Round the Room"	Emmylou Harris, Kate McGarrigle, Anna McGarrigle	5:31
13.	"Beyond the Great Divide (Karen Brooks cover)"	J.C. Crowley, Jack Wesley Routh	4:26

== Personnel ==
- Emmylou Harris – vocals, acoustic guitar (1–13), harmonies (2–4, 6–13)
- Brian Ahern – 12-string guitars (1, 6), baritone electric guitar (4, 7, 12), Tac-Tac bass (5), Afuche (5), Earthwood bass (6, 11), banjo (6)
- Tim Goodman – acoustic guitar (1)
- Emory Gordy Jr. – bass (1)
- Jim Horn – recorders (1)
- Keith Knudsen – drums (1)
- John McFee – Cordovox and electric guitars (1)
- Bill Payne – keyboards (1)
- Lynn Langham – backing vocals (1)
- Jack Routh – backing vocals (1)
- Randy Sharp – backing vocals, vocal arrangement (1)
- Glen D. Hardin – keyboards (2, 4, 5, 7, 8)
- Greg Leisz – slide electric guitar (2), steel guitar (5, 8, 10, 13), Weisenborn (8, 11), mandocello (11)
- Buddy Miller – backing vocals (1), harmony vocals (2), vocals (8)
- Harry Stinson – drums (2, 4–8, 12)
- Kenny Vaughan – electric guitar (2, 4, 5, 7 8)
- Glenn Worf – bass (2, 4, 5, 7, 8)
- Steve Fishell – steel (3, 7, 12)
- Mary Ann Kennedy – harmony vocals, mandolin (3, 11)
- Phil Madeira – accordion (3, 9, 10, 12, 13)
- David Pomeroy – bass (3, 12)
- Pam Rose – harmony vocals, acoustic guitar (3, 11)
- Patrick Warren – keyboards (3, 6, 11, 12)
- Karen Brooks – backing vocals (1), harmony vocals (4, 7)
- Dolly Parton – harmony vocals (5)
- Vince Gill – harmony vocals (5)
- Kate McGarrigle – vocals (3, 6, 12), gut-string guitar (6, 12), banjo solo (6)
- Anna McGarrigle – vocals (3, 6, 12)
- Mike Auldridge – vocals, Dobro (9, 10, 13)
- John Starling – vocals, acoustic guitar (9, 10, 13)
- Stuart Duncan – mandolin (9, 10, 13)
- Fats Kaplin – mandolin (9)
- Marc Bell – sound engineer (6, 12)

== Release history ==
Region	Date
Netherlands	6 June 2008
Belgium	6 June 2008
Ireland	6 June 2008
United Kingdom	9 June 2008
Norway	9 June 2008
Denmark	9 June 2008
Portugal	9 June 2008
Greece	9 June 2008
United States	10 June 2008
Canada	10 June 2008
Sweden	11 June 2008
Germany	13 June 2008
Italy	13 June 2008
Switzerland	13 June 2008
Austria	13 June 2008
Australia	14 June 2008
New Zealand	14 June 2008

== Charts ==
=== Weekly charts ===
Chart (2008)	Peak position
Australian Albums (ARIA Charts)	58
US Billboard 200	22
US Top Country Albums (Billboard)	4

=== Year-end charts ===
Chart (2008)	Position
US Top Country Albums (Billboard)	60

== Release history ==
Release history and formats for All I Intended to Be
Region	Date	Format	Label	Ref.
North America	June 10, 2008	CD; music download	Nonesuch Records	
