= Pieces of the Sky =

Studio album by Emmylou Harris
- Released: February 7, 1975
- Studios: Enactron Truck, Los Angeles, California; Track Recorders, Silver Spring, Maryland
- Genre: Country
- Length: 38:40 (1975 release); 43:17 (2004 reissue)
- Label: Reprise
- Producer: Brian Ahern

Emmylou Harris chronology
Gliding Bird (1970)	Pieces of the Sky (1975)	Elite Hotel (1975)

Singles from Pieces of the Sky
- 1. "Too Far Gone" Released: April 1975; 2. "If I Could Only Win Your Love" Released: June 1975

Professional ratings
Review scores
Source	Rating
AllMusic	5/5 stars
Christgau's Record Guide	C+
The Guardian	4/5 stars

Pieces of the Sky is the second studio album and major-label debut by American country music artist Emmylou Harris, released on February 7, 1975, by Reprise Records.

Although she had released the obscure folk-styled Gliding Bird five years earlier, Pieces of the Sky became the album that launched Harris's career and is widely considered to be her debut. In those intervening years she forged a musical relationship with Gram Parsons that altered the musical direction of her career. The album includes Harris's first high-charting Billboard country hit, the No. 4 "If I Could Only Win Your Love," and the relatively low-charting No. 73 "Too Far Gone" (originally a 1967 hit for Tammy Wynette). The overall song selection was varied and showed early on how eclectic Harris's musical tastes were. In addition to her own "Boulder to Birmingham" (written for Gram Parsons, who had died the previous year), she included the Merle Haggard classic "The Bottle Let Me Down," the Beatles' "For No One," and Dolly Parton's "Coat of Many Colors." (Parton, in turn, covered "Boulder to Birmingham" on her 1976 album All I Can Do.) On Shel Silverstein's "Queen of the Silver Dollar," Harris's longtime friend and vocal collaborator Linda Ronstadt sings harmony.

Pieces of the Sky rose as far as the No. 7 spot on the Billboard country albums chart.

Pieces of the Sky was included in Robert Dimery's 1001 Albums You Must Hear Before You Die.

At the 18th Annual Grammy Awards, the duet single with Herb Pedersen, "If I Could Only Win Your Love," was nominated for Best Female Country Vocal Performance but the award went to Linda Ronstadt for "I Can't Help It (If I'm Still in Love with You)." It is noteworthy that Dolly Parton was also nominated, in the same year, for "Jolene" (as a track from the album In Concert). Emmylou Harris, Linda Ronstadt and Dolly Parton would famously collaborate on the Trio and Trio II albums years later and would earn the trio Grammys for both.

== Track listing ==
No.	Title	Writer(s)	Length
1.	"Bluebird Wine"	Rodney Crowell	3:18
2.	"Too Far Gone"	Billy Sherrill	4:05
3.	"If I Could Only Win Your Love (with Herb Pedersen)"	Charlie Louvin, Ira Louvin	2:36
4.	"Boulder to Birmingham"	Emmylou Harris, Bill Danoff	3:33
5.	"Before Believing"	Danny Flowers	4:44
6.	"The Bottle Let Me Down"	Merle Haggard	3:16
7.	"Sleepless Nights"	Felice and Boudleaux Bryant	3:25
8.	"Coat of Many Colors"	Dolly Parton	3:42
9.	"For No One"	John Lennon, Paul McCartney	3:40
10.	"Queen of the Silver Dollar"	Shel Silverstein	5:14

== Bonus tracks ==
A 2004 CD reissue added two previously unissued bonus tracks:

1. "Hank and Lefty" (Dallas Frazier, Doodle Owens) – 2:50
2. "California Cottonfields" (Dallas Frazier, Earl Montgomery) – 2:47

== Personnel ==
- Emmylou Harris – vocals, acoustic guitar
- Brian Ahern – acoustic guitar, guitar, bass
- Bruce Archer – acoustic guitar
- Duke Bardwell – bass
- Byron Berline – fiddle, mandolin
- James Burton – electric guitar, Gut-string guitar, Dobro
- Mark Cuff – drums
- Rick Cunha – acoustic guitar, guitar
- Nick DeCaro – string arrangements
- Amos Garrett – electric guitar
- Richard Greene – fiddle
- Tom Guidera – bass
- Glen Hardin – piano, electric piano, string arrangements
- Ben Keith – pedal steel
- Bernie Leadon – acoustic guitar, bass, banjo, dobro, backing vocals
- Bill Payne – piano
- Herb Pedersen – acoustic guitar, 12-string guitar, banjo, backing vocals
- Danny Pendleton – pedal steel
- Ray Pohlman – bass
- Linda Ronstadt – backing vocals
- Ricky Skaggs – fiddle, viola
- Fayssoux Starling – backing vocals
- Ron Tutt – drums

Technical

- Brian Ahern – producer, engineer
- Chris Skene – engineer
- Paul Skene – engineer
- Fran Tate – engineer
- Stuart Taylor – engineer
- Lisa Phillips – angel drawings on cover

== Release history ==
Release history and formats for Pieces of the Sky
Region	Date	Format	Label	Ref.
North America	February 7, 1975	LP; cassette	Reprise Records	
