= Fayssoux Starling McLean =

American country singer

- Genres: Country music, bluegrass music
- Occupation: Musician
- Instruments: Vocals, guitar, percussion
- Years active: 1975–present
- Label: Red Beet Records
- Website: fayssouxstarling.com

Fayssoux Starling McLean is an American country singer. Emmylou Harris says "I've always loved Fayssoux's voice. She's one of my favorite singers." Rodney Crowell says "Charm, elegance, whippoorwills and Magnolia dewdrops: these are the things that come to mind when I hear Fayssoux sing."

== Biography ==
=== Early history ===
Fayssoux grew up in Spartanburg, South Carolina. Early musical influences included her parents' eclectic record album collection, bluegrass and country music on the radio, and her grandmother Mary Jane, who sang and played piano. Fayssoux preferred to sing harmony, rather than melody.

=== Emmylou Harris ===
While attending the University of Virginia, McLean met her soon-to-be husband John Starling. They lived in the Washington, D.C. area, where she taught speech therapy in public schools and John became a founding member of the Seldom Scene. One night, John visited a Georgetown club and brought Emmylou Harris home to meet Fayssoux.

This was the first of a number of evening singing sessions, in which Fayssoux also met Rodney Crowell. Fayssoux and Emmylou became friends, and while continuing to work as a speech therapist, Fayssoux added harmony vocals to Emmylou's early Warner Bros. albums, including Luxury Liner, Quarter Moon in a Ten Cent Town, Elite Hotel and Pieces of the Sky. She also sang duets with Harris on "Spanish is the Loving Tongue" and "Green Rolling Hills."

=== Later career ===
In 1993, Fayssoux dropped out of the music scene altogether, and returned to Spartanburg with her second husband E. T. McLean and their daughter, where she continued work as a school speech therapist. In 1997, Peter Cooper called her for an interview for his book Hub City Music Makers, Fayssoux began singing harmony with Cooper at book signings, and eventually she began singing lead.

Peter Cooper helped produce Fayssoux's first solo album, Early, featuring harmony vocals by Harris. Other guests on the album include David Ball, Ricky Skaggs, The Whites, and Lloyd Green.

Cooper also produced Fayssoux's second album I Can't Wait which features Sierra Hull, Justin Moses, and Mark Fain. Both albums were released by Red Beet Records.

Fayssoux sings and plays guitar in a duo with accompanist Brandon Turner and she also leads a band, the Bluegrass Messengers.

== Discography ==
=== Solo albums ===
- 2008: Early (Red Beet)
- 2014: I Can't Walt (Red Beet)

=== With Emmylou Harris ===
- 1975: Pieces of the Sky (Reprise)
- 1975: Elite Hotel (Warner Bros.)
- 1976: Luxury Liner (Warner Bros.)
- 1978: Quarter Moon in a Ten Cent Town (Warner Bros.)
- 1979: Blue Kentucky Girl (Warner Bros.)
- 1981: Cimarron (Warner Bros.)

=== Also appears on ===
- 1972: Mike Auldridge – Dobro (Takoma)
- 1974: Mike Auldridge – Blues and Blue Grass (Takoma)
- 1976: The Rosslyn Mountain Boys – The Rosslyn Mountain Boys (Adelphi Records)
- 1977: Billy Joe Shaver – Gypsy Boy (Capricorn)
- 1977: John Starling – Long Time Gone (Sugar Hill)
