= Stumble into Grace =

Studio album by Emmylou Harris
- Released: September 23, 2003
- Recorded: February–June 2003
- Studios: Kingston, New York; Nashville, Tennessee
- Genres: Country, pop
- Length: 44:57
- Label: Nonesuch
- Producer: Malcolm Burn

Emmylou Harris chronology
Red Dirt Girl (2000)	Stumble into Grace (2003)	The Very Best of Emmylou Harris: Heartaches & Highways (2005)

Professional ratings
Aggregate scores
Source	Rating
Metacritic	87/100
Review scores
Source	Rating
AllMusic	4/5 stars
Entertainment Weekly	A
The Guardian	3/5 stars
The Independent	4/5 stars
Mojo	5/5 stars
The Observer	4/5 stars
Q	4/5 stars
The Rolling Stone Album Guide	4/5 stars
Uncut	5/5 stars
USA Today	3/4 stars

Stumble into Grace is the twentieth studio album by American singer/songwriter Emmylou Harris, released on September 23, 2003, by Nonesuch Records. It peaked at No. 6 on the Billboard country albums chart. Like its immediate predecessor, Red Dirt Girl, the album contained a significant number of Harris' own compositions.

== Track listing ==
No.	Title	Writer(s)	Length
1.	"Here I Am"	Emmylou Harris	3:46
2.	"I Will Dream"	Harris, Kate McGarrigle, Anna McGarrigle	4:59
3.	"Little Bird"	Harris, Kate McGarrigle, Anna McGarrigle	3:14
4.	"Time in Babylon"	Harris, Jill Cunniff	4:37
5.	"Can You Hear Me Now"	Harris, Malcolm Burn	5:35
6.	"Strong Hand (For June)"	Harris	3:15
7.	"Jupiter Rising"	Harris, Paul Kennerley	3:02
8.	"O Evangeline"	Harris	5:41
9.	"Plaisir d'Amour"	Traditional arranged by Harris, Kate & Anna McGarrigle	2:21
10.	"Lost Unto This World"	Harris, Daniel Lanois	4:34
11.	"Cup of Kindness"	Harris	3:53
Total length:			44:57

== Personnel ==
- Emmylou Harris - vocals, acoustic guitar, 6-string bass guitar
- Tony Hall - bass, guitar, backing vocals
- Brady Blade - drums, backing vocals
- Ethan Johns - drums, electric guitar
- Julie Miller - backing vocals
- Jane Siberry - backing vocals
- Malcolm Burn - bass, electric guitar, piano, whistling, charanga, percussion, harmonica, Fender Rhodes, B2 organ, backing vocals
- Buddy Miller - acoustic guitar, electric guitar
- Kate McGarrigle - accordion, acoustic guitar, backing vocals
- Anna McGarrigle - accordion, backing vocals
- Daryl Johnson - percussion, bass, backing vocals
- Daniel Lanois - pedal steel guitar, electronic orchestra, backing vocals
- Bernie Leadon - electric guitar
- Linda Ronstadt - backing vocals
- Kevin Salem - electric guitar
- Colin Linden - electric guitar
- Gillian Welch - backing vocals
- Jill Cunniff - backing vocals
- Joe West - engineer

== Charts ==
=== Weekly charts ===
Chart (2003)	Peak position
Australian Albums (ARIA Charts)	92
US Billboard 200	58
US Top Country Albums (Billboard)	6

=== Year-end charts ===
Chart (2003)	Position
US Top Country Albums (Billboard)	68

== Release history ==
Release history and formats for Stumble into Grace
Region	Date	Format	Label	Ref.
North America	September 23, 2003	CD	Nonesuch Records	
