= Angel Band (album) =

Studio album by Emmylou Harris
- Released: July 7, 1987
- Recorded: 1987
- Genres: Country, gospel
- Length: 36:49
- Label: Warner Bros. Nashville
- Producers: Emory Gordy, Jr., Emmylou Harris

Emmylou Harris chronology
Trio (1987)	Angel Band (1987)	Bluebird (1989)

Professional ratings
Review scores
Source	Rating
AllMusic	4/5 stars
Chicago Tribune	favorable
Los Angeles Times	favorable
Orlando Sentinel	5/5 stars

Angel Band is an acoustic collection of gospel songs by Emmylou Harris, released on July 7, 1987. The album was recorded live "off the floor" featuring a band composed of Vince Gill (mandolin, vocals), Carl Jackson (guitar, vocals) and Emory Gordy Jr. (bass, vocals). Jerry Douglas (dobro) and Mark O'Connor (fiddle) were overdubbed on some tracks.

The album netted for Emmylou Harris another nomination for the Grammy Award for Best Female Country Vocal Performance at the 30th Annual Grammy Awards with the award going to K.T. Oslin for "80s Ladies".

== Track listing ==
No.	Title	Writer(s)	Length
1.	"Where Could I Go But to the Lord"	J.B. Coats	3:31
2.	"Angel Band"	Traditional; arr. Emmylou Harris	3:03
3.	"If I Be Lifted Up"	Traditional; arr. Emmylou Harris	2:44
4.	"Precious Memories"	Traditional; arr. Emmylou Harris	4:30
5.	"Bright Morning Stars"	Public Domain; arr. Emmylou Harris	2:33
6.	"When He Calls"	Paul Kennerley	2:42
7.	"We Shall Rise"	Traditional; arr. Emmylou Harris	2:12
8.	"Drifting Too Far"	Traditional; arr. Emmylou Harris	4:47
9.	"Who Will Sing for Me?"	Ralph Stanley, Carter Stanley	2:32
10.	"Someday My Ship Will Sail"	Allen Reynolds	2:26
11.	"The Other Side of Life"	Alan O'Bryant	2:36
12.	"When They Ring Those Golden Bells"	Traditional; arr. Emory Gordy, Jr. and Patty Loveless	3:13

== Personnel ==
- Emmylou Harris – acoustic guitar, arranger, lead vocals

Additional musicians

- Mike Auldridge – dobro
- Jerry Douglas – dobro
- Vince Gill – acoustic guitar, mandolin, tenor vocals
- Emory Gordy Jr. – acoustic guitar, arranger, bass vocals, bass guitar
- Carl Jackson – acoustic guitar, baritone vocals
- Mark O'Connor – fiddle, viola, mandola

Production

- Milan Bogdan – digital editing
- Jim Cotton – engineer
- Alton Dellinger – technical consultant
- Paul Goldberg – engineer
- Patty Loveless – arranger
- McGuire – photography
- Glenn Meadows – mastering
- Jessie Noble – coordination
- Keith Odle – mixing assistant
- Thomas Ryan – design
- Joe Scaife – engineer
- Steve Tillisch – mixing
- David Wariner – lettering

== Chart performance ==
Chart (1987)	Peak position
U.S. Billboard Top Country Albums	23
U.S. Billboard 200	166

== Release history ==
Release history and formats for Angel Band
Region	Date	Format	Label	Ref.
North America	July 7, 1987	LP; CD; cassette	Warner Bros. Records	
