= Brand New Dance (album) =

Studio album by Emmylou Harris
- Released: October 16, 1990
- Recorded: Nashville, 1990
- Genre: Country
- Length: 37:32
- Label: Warner Bros. Nashville
- Producers: Richard Bennett, Allen Reynolds

Emmylou Harris chronology
Bluebird (1989)	Brand New Dance (1990)	At the Ryman (1992)

Professional ratings
Review scores
Source	Rating
AllMusic	2.5/5 stars
Chicago Tribune	3.5/4 stars
Entertainment Weekly	A
MusicHound Rock: The Essential Album Guide	3/5 stars
Select	3/5 medals

Brand New Dance is an album which Emmylou Harris released on October 16, 1990. Produced by Richard Bennett and Allan Reynolds, the album mixed a rather eclectic collection of covers, including Bruce Springsteen's "Tougher Than the Rest", and Dave Mallett's "Red, Red Rose". Though it sold reasonably well, it was Harris' first studio album in fifteen years to yield no top forty country singles, and marked the beginning of a commercial decline for the singer, which would ultimately lead her to redirect her music away from mainstream country, a few years later.

== Track listing ==
No.	Title	Writer(s)	Length
1.	"Wheels of Love"	Marjy Plant	2:41
2.	"Tougher Than the Rest"	Bruce Springsteen	4:59
3.	"In His World"	Kostas, Leigh Reynolds	4:14
4.	"Sweet Dreams Of You"	Paul Kennerley, John David	3:55
5.	"Easy for You to Say"	Jack Wesley Routh, Randy Sharp	3:21
6.	"Rollin' and Ramblin' (The Death of Hank Williams)"	Robin Williams, Linda Williams, Jerome Clark	3:27
7.	"Better Off Without You"	Marshall Chapman, Dennis Walker, Fontaine Brown	5:15
8.	"Never Be Anyone Else But You"	Baker Knight	2:20
9.	"Brand New Dance"	Paul Kennerley	3:24
10.	"Red Red Rose"	David Mallett	3:56

== Personnel ==
- Richard Bennett – Acoustic & Electric Guitar, Bass, Mandolin, Tambourine, Producer, 6-String Bass
- Mary Black – Harmony Vocals
- Bruce Bouton – Steel Guitar
- Marshall Chapman – Harmony Vocals
- Kathy Chiavola – Harmony Vocals
- Charles Cochran – String Arrangements
- Iris DeMent – Harmony Vocals
- Stuart Duncan – Fiddle, Mandolin
- Connie Ellisor – Strings
- Peter Gorisch – Cello
- Carl Gorodetzky – Strings
- Jim Grosjean – Strings
- Emmylou Harris – Acoustic Guitar, Vocals, Harmony Vocals
- James Hollihan Jr. – Slide Guitar
- Roy M. "Junior" Husky – Bass
- John Jarvis – Piano
- Kieran Kane – Harmony Vocals
- Dolores Keane – Harmony Vocals
- Kostas – Harmony Vocals
- Lee Larrison – Strings
- Chris Leuzinger – Acoustic & Electric Guitar
- Laura LiPuma – Art Direction, Design
- Claire Lynch – Harmony Vocals
- Ted Madsen – Strings
- Kenny Malone – Percussion, Drums
- Robert Mason – Strings
- Mark Miller – Engineer, Mixing
- Dennis Molchan – Strings
- Laura Molyneaux – Strings
- Melba Montgomery – Harmony Vocals
- Peter Nash – Photography
- Nashville String Machine – Strings, Group
- Liam O'Flynn – Whistle (Human), Uilleann pipes
- Jamie O'Hara – Harmony Vocals
- Wayland Patton – Harmony Vocals
- Dave Pomeroy – Bass
- Denny Purcell – Mastering
- Allen Reynolds – Producer
- Pamela Sixfin – Strings
- Milton Sledge – Percussion, Drums
- Jo-El Sonnier – Triangle, French Accordion
- Davy Spillane – Whistle (Human), Uilleann pipes
- Harry Stinson – Drums
- Garry Tallent – Bass
- Mark Tanner – Strings
- Barry Tashian – Harmony Vocals
- Gary VanOsdale – Strings
- Pete Wasner – Piano
- Kristin Wilkinson – Strings
- Bobby Wood – Organ, Piano, Keyboards, Electric Piano
- Glenn Worf – Bass
- Bob Wray – Bass
- Cindy Reynolds Wyatt – Harp

== Chart performance ==
Chart (1990)	Peak position
U.S. Billboard Top Country Albums	45

== Release history ==
Release history and formats for Brand New Dance
Region	Date	Format	Label	Ref.
North America	October 16, 1990	LP; CD; cassette	Reprise Records	
