= Western Wall: The Tucson Sessions =

Studio album by Linda Ronstadt and Emmylou Harris
- Released: August 24, 1999
- Recorded: 1999, Tucson, Arizona
- Studios: Arizona Inn and Jim Brady's Studio (Tucson, Arizona); Skyline Studios (New York City, New York); Studio Frisson (Montreal, Canada)
- Genres: Country, folk, folk rock
- Length: 52:47
- Label: Asylum Nashville
- Producer: Glyn Johns

Linda Ronstadt chronology
Trio II (1999)	Western Wall: The Tucson Sessions (1999)	A Merry Little Christmas (2000)

Emmylou Harris chronology
Trio II (1999)	Western Wall: The Tucson Sessions (1999)	Red Dirt Girl (2000)

Professional ratings
Review scores
Source	Rating
AllMusic	4.5/5 stars
The A.V. Club	(favorable)
Entertainment Weekly	A−
Los Angeles Times	3/4 stars
People	(favorable)
Q	4/5 stars
Robert Christgau	(1-star Honorable Mention)
The Rolling Stone Album Guide	4/5 stars

Western Wall: The Tucson Sessions is a 1999 duet album by American singer, songwriter, and producer Linda Ronstadt and singer, songwriter, and guitarist Emmylou Harris, who had previously collaborated on two albums with Dolly Parton.

The album was well received critically, and it made several year-end Top Ten lists. The disc was recorded at the Arizona Inn in Tucson, Arizona.

This album hit #6 on Billboard's Country albums chart and #73 on Billboard's main album chart. The two artists teamed for a concert tour in support of the disc in late 1999. It was nominated for several Grammy Awards.

== Track listing ==
No.	Title	Writer(s)	Length
1.	"Loving the Highway Man"	Andy Prieboy	3:30
2.	"Raise the Dead"	Emmylou Harris	3:18
3.	"For a Dancer"	Jackson Browne	4:43
4.	"Western Wall"	Rosanne Cash	2:35
5.	"1917"	David Olney	5:24
6.	"He Was Mine"	Paul Kennerley	3:19
7.	"Sweet Spot"	Emmylou Harris, Jill Cunniff	3:34
8.	"Sisters of Mercy"	Leonard Cohen	3:58
9.	"Falling Down"	Patty Griffin	3:15
10.	"Valerie"	Patti Scialfa	4:04
11.	"This Is to Mother You"	Sinéad O'Connor	3:16
12.	"All I Left Behind"	Emmylou Harris, Kate McGarrigle, Anna McGarrigle	3:23
13.	"Across the Border"	Bruce Springsteen	6:20
Total length:			52:47

== Personnel ==
- Linda Ronstadt – lead vocals (1, 3, 4, 6, 8, 9, 11, 13), harmony vocals (1, 2, 5, 9–12), backing vocals (7)
- Emmylou Harris – lead vocals (1, 2, 4, 5, 7, 8, 10–12), harmony vocals (1–3, 6, 9, 11, 13), electric guitar (2), acoustic guitar (3, 4, 6, 9, 12), backing vocals (7)
- Paul Wickens – accordion (5, 8, 13)
- Andy Fairweather Low – electric guitar (1, 9, 13), bass guitar (1, 10), acoustic guitar (8), backing vocals (13)
- Ethan Johns – acoustic guitar (1, 6), electric guitar (1, 6, 9, 11), drums (1, 3, 6, 7, 9–13), percussion (1, 2, 6, 7, 9, 11), baritone guitar (2), slide guitar (2), mandocello (4), Spanish guitar (5), marxophone (5), bass guitar (6), guitars (7), Optigan (8), dulcimer (9), synth bass (11)
- Greg Leisz – acoustic guitar (1, 5, 6, 8), electric guitar (1, 9, 10), mandola (2), Weissenborn guitar (4), pedal steel guitar (6, 13), mandolin (8, 11), bass guitar (9, 13), mandocello (12), backing vocals (13)
- Bernie Leadon – electric guitar (2, 13), acoustic guitar (3, 6, 8), bass guitar (3), mandolin (4), synthesized acoustic bass (5), guitarrón (8), mandolin (8), electric 12-string guitar (10), mandocello (11, 13), 6-string bass (12), backing vocals (13)
- Michel Pepin – bass guitar (12), cymbals (12)
- Neil Young – harmonica (3, 13), harmony vocals (3, 13)
- Samantha Rowe – cello (4)
- Paul Kennerley – backing vocals (1), electric guitar (6)
- Anna McGarrigle – backing vocals (5, 8), harmony vocals (12)
- Kate McGarrigle – backing vocals (5, 8), harmony vocals (12)
- Kate Aumonier – backing vocals (9)
- Helen Watson – backing vocals (9)

=== Production ===
- Glyn Johns – producer, engineer
- George Massenburg – vocal recording for Linda Ronstadt (3, 6, 9)
- John Nowland – vocal and harmonica recording for Neil Young and Emmylou Harris (3, 13)
- James "Jumbo" Aumonier – assistant engineer
- Michel Pepin – additional recording (12)
- Jim Brady – technical support
- Stephen Marcussen – mastering at A&M Studios (Hollywood, California)
- Chris Walters – production coordinator
- Meghann Ahern – production assistant
- Alli Truch – art direction, design
- Caroline Greyshock – photography

== Chart performance ==
Chart (1999)	Peak position
Australian Albums (ARIA)	163
U.S. Billboard Top Country Albums	6
U.S. Billboard 200	73

== Release history ==
Release history and formats for Western Wall: The Tucson Sessions
Region	Date	Format	Label	Ref.
North America	August 24, 1999	CD; cassette	Asylum Records	
