= Trio II =

Studio album by Dolly Parton, Emmylou Harris and Linda Ronstadt
- Released: February 9, 1999
- Recorded: 1994
- Studio: The Site (Marin County)
- Genre: Country
- Length: 41:13
- Label: Asylum
- Producer: George Massenburg

Dolly Parton, Emmylou Harris and Linda Ronstadt chronology
| Trio (1987) | Trio II (1999) | The Complete Trio Collection (2016) |

Dolly Parton chronology
| Hungry Again (1998) | Trio II (1999) | Precious Memories (1999) |

Emmylou Harris chronology
| Spyboy (1998) | Trio II (1999) | Western Wall: The Tucson Sessions (1999) |

Linda Ronstadt chronology
| We Ran (1998) | Trio II (1999) | Western Wall: The Tucson Sessions (1999) |

Singles from Trio II
- 1. "High Sierra" Released: January 1999; 2. "After the Gold Rush" Released: April 1999; 3. "Feels Like Home" Released: April 1999; 4. "Do I Ever Cross Your Mind" Released: April 1999

Trio II is the second collaborative studio album by Dolly Parton, Emmylou Harris and Linda Ronstadt. It was released on February 9, 1999, by Asylum Records.

== Background ==
A dozen years after the release of their Platinum, Grammy-winning Trio album, the country music supergroup returned with another in the same vein. The songs were recorded in 1994 by Parton, Harris and Ronstadt, but label disputes and conflicting schedules prevented their release at the time. Eventually, Ronstadt remixed five of the album's ten tracks (sans Parton's vocals) to include on her 1995 album, Feels Like Home; "Lover's Return", "High Sierra", "After the Gold Rush", "The Blue Train", and "Feels Like Home".

In 1998, after Parton and Harris had parted ways with their respective labels, they decided to release the album as originally recorded. Childhood photos of Parton, Harris and Ronstadt were used for the album's cover when a photo shoot proved impossible due to their busy schedules.

== Release and promotion ==
The album was released on February 9, 1999, and though scheduling conflicts would not allow for an extended concert tour, Parton, Harris and Ronstadt did a short promotional tour to support the album. The trio made appearances on CBS This Morning, The Tonight Show with Jay Leno, The Today Show, The Late Show with David Letterman, and The Rosie O'Donnell Show.

Initially, there were no plans to release a single to country radio. "High Sierra" was issued to adult contemporary stations in January 1999 prior to the album's release and was also sent to country stations by mistake where it received some airplay. In April 1999, following strong sales of the album, three singles were released to country radio simultaneously; "After the Gold Rush", "Feels Like Home" and "Do I Ever Cross Your Mind". A music video was filmed for "After the Gold Rush" at a synagogue in New York City on March 25 and premiered April 13 on Great American Country.

== Critical reception ==
Professional ratings
Review scores
| Source | Rating |
|---|---|
| AllMusic | 3/5 stars |
| The Encyclopedia of Popular Music | 3/5 stars |
| Entertainment Weekly | B+ |
| Los Angeles Times | 3.5/4 stars |
| Robert Christgau | (neither) |
| Rolling Stone | 3/5 stars |

The album received positive reviews from music critics.

Billboard reviewed the album in the February 6, 1999, issue and said, "Trio II reprises the 1987 joint effort by these three stellar voices. George Massenburg's production is crystal clear and on target. The eternal appeal of such ethereal singing is best epitomized in the Carter Family's "Lover's Return", with its silvery guitar chimes winding around the Trio's sweet harmony singing. Dolly Parton's pop-ish "Do I Ever Cross Your Mind" is rendered forever country by Emmylou Harris' trilling lead vocal. Neil Young's "After The Gold Rush" takes on a genuine fairy-tale quality in this shimmering version. Harris' lead vocal gives Donagh Long's "You'll Never Be the Sun" an anthemic quality, as does Linda Ronstadt's lead on Randy Newman's "Feels Like Home". Album closer is the O'Kanes' lovely "When We're Gone, Long Gone"."

Entertainment Weekly gave the album a B+ and said that it "comes about 75 percent of the way" and is "very fine nonetheless." The Los Angeles Times gave the album 3.5 out of 4 stars, saying that the "inspired reading of the Neil Young stalwart "After the Gold Rush" brings harmonies of celestial loveliness to Young's elegy to a passing era. Harris' signature vocal purity is a perfect match for Donagh Long's stunningly pretty love song "You'll Never Be the Sun." Ronstadt taps her formidable country-rock heritage in Jennifer Kimball and Tom Kimmel's "Blue Train" and Randy Newman's "Feels Like Home"."

Writing for AllMusic, Becky Byrkit called the album "a gem along the beautiful lines of cubic zirconium, from the most well-intended and loving of real-deal songbird girlfriends." Patrick Carr of Rolling Stone gave the album 3 out of 5 stars and said that "at its best, this mutual-admiration society works with a vengeance approaching the heavenly."

== Commercial performance ==
The album peaked at No. 4 on the U.S. Billboard Top Country Albums chart and No. 62 on the U.S. Billboard 200. The album also peaked at No. 4 in Canada on the RPM Country Albums chart.

The album's first single, "High Sierra", was sent to adult contemporary stations in January 1999 and peaked at No. 90 on the RPM Country 100 chart. Following the album's strong sales, three singles were issued simultaneously to country stations in April 1999; "After the Gold Rush", "Feels Like Home" and "Do I Ever Cross Your Mind"; none of which received enough airplay to chart.

== Accolades ==
The album was nominated for the Grammy Award for Best Country Album. "After the Gold Rush" won the Grammy Award for Best Country Collaboration with Vocals.

42nd Annual Grammy Awards

| Year | Nominee / work | Award | Result |
|---|---|---|---|
| 2000 | Trio II | Best Country Album | Nominated |
| 2000 | "After the Gold Rush" | Best Country Collaboration with Vocals | Won |

== Track listing ==
| No. | Title | Writer(s) | Length |
|---|---|---|---|
| 1. | "Lover's Return" | A.P. Carter; Maybelle Carter; Sara Carter | 4:00 |
| 2. | "High Sierra" | Harley Allen | 4:21 |
| 3. | "Do I Ever Cross Your Mind" | Dolly Parton | 3:16 |
| 4. | "After the Gold Rush" | Neil Young | 3:31 |
| 5. | "The Blue Train" | Jennifer Kimball; Tom Kimmel | 4:57 |
| 6. | "I Feel the Blues Movin' In" | Del McCoury | 4:31 |
| 7. | "You'll Never Be the Sun" | Donagh Long | 4:43 |
| 8. | "He Rode All the Way to Texas" | John Starling | 3:07 |
| 9. | "Feels Like Home" | Randy Newman | 4:47 |
| 10. | "When We're Gone, Long Gone" | Kieran Kane; James Paul O'Hara | 4:00 |
| Total length: | | | 41:13 |

== Personnel ==
Adapted from the album liner notes.

- Emmylou Harris – lead and harmony vocals
- Dolly Parton – lead and harmony vocals
- Linda Ronstadt – lead and harmony vocals, strings (4), string arrangements (4)
- Robbie Buchanan – acoustic piano (4, 8, 9), Rhodes electric piano (5), Hammond B3 organ (9)
- Helen Voices – synthesizers (4)
- Mark Casstevens – acoustic guitar (1–3, 5–9)
- Carl Jackson – acoustic guitar (1–3, 6, 10)
- Dean Parks – electric guitar (5, 8, 9), acoustic guitar (7, 8), mandolin (9)
- John Starling – acoustic guitar (10)
- David Grisman – mandolin (1–3, 6, 8–10)
- David Lindley – autoharp (1)
- Ben Keith – pedal steel guitar (5)
- Roy Huskey, Jr. – bass (1, 6), double bass (2, 3, 10)
- Leland Sklar – bass (5, 8, 9)
- Edgar Meyer – double bass (7)
- Larry Atamanuik – drums (3)
- Jim Keltner – drums (5, 6, 8–10)
- Alison Krauss – fiddle (2, 3, 6, 10)
- Dennis James – glass harmonica (4)
- David Campbell – strings (4, 7, 9)

Production

- George Massenburg – producer, recording, mixing
- John Starling – co-producer
- Nathaniel Kunkel – recording
- Kevin Scott – recording assistant
- Linda Ronstadt – mixing
- Doug Sax – mastering at The Mastering Lab (Hollywood, California)
- Gail Rosman – production assistant
- Janet Stark – production assistant
- Michael Hagegood – art administration
- John Brenes – production archivist
- Lyn Bradley – art direction, design
- John Kosh – art direction, design

== Charts ==
=== Weekly charts ===
| Chart (1999) | Peak position |
|---|---|
| Australian Albums (ARIA) | 66 |
| Canada Country Albums (RPM) | 4 |
| Dutch Albums (Album Top 100) | 69 |
| UK Country Albums (Official Charts) | 4 |
| US Billboard 200 | 62 |
| US Top Country Albums (Billboard) | 4 |

=== Year-end charts ===
| Chart (1999) | Position |
|---|---|
| US Top Country Albums (Billboard) | 29 |

=== Singles ===
| Title | Year | Peak position |
| Title | Year | CAN Country |
|---|---|---|
| "High Sierra" | 1999 | 90 |

== Certifications ==
| Region | Certification | Certified units/sales |
|---|---|---|
| United States (RIAA) | Gold | 500,000^{^} |
^{^} Shipments figures based on certification alone.

== Release history ==
Release history and formats for Trio II
| Region | Date | Format | Label | Ref. |
|---|---|---|---|---|
| North America | February 9, 1999 | CD; cassette | Asylum Records | |
