= Elite Hotel =

Studio album by Emmylou Harris
- Released: December 29, 1975
- Recorded: June 1975
- Studios: Enactron Truck, Los Angeles, California
- Genre: Country
- Length: 43:35
- Label: Reprise
- Producer: Brian Ahern

Emmylou Harris chronology
Pieces of the Sky (1975)	Elite Hotel (1975)	Luxury Liner (1976)

Singles from Elite Hotel
- 1. "Together Again" Released: January 1976; 2. "One of These Days" Released: March 6, 1976; 3. "Sweet Dreams" Released: September 22, 1976

Professional ratings
Review scores
Source	Rating
AllMusic	4.5/5 stars
Christgau's Record Guide	C+
The Guardian	4/5 stars

Elite Hotel is the third studio album by American country music artist Emmylou Harris, released in 1975. Elite Hotel was Harris' second album to be released in 1975, preceded by the widely acclaimed Pieces of the Sky. Elite Hotel surpassed it on the Billboard charts, becoming Harris' first number one country album. The album yielded two number one country singles: "Together Again" and Harris' version of the Patsy Cline hit "Sweet Dreams". The song "One of These Days" made it to the number three spot. A performance of the Beatles' "Here, There and Everywhere" entered the pop charts at number 65. Harris' eclectic musical tastes were reflected in her choice of material by Hank Williams, The Beatles, Gram Parsons and Buck Owens. Harris' vocals on the album earned her the Grammy Award for Best Country Vocal Performance, Female.

The cover photograph was taken by Tom Wilkes at 2259 Inyo Street, Mojave, California.

== Track listing ==
No.	Title	Writer(s)	Length
1.	"Amarillo"	Emmylou Harris, Rodney Crowell	3:05
2.	"Together Again"	Buck Owens	3:56
3.	"Feelin' Single, Seein' Double"	Wayne Kemp	2:34
4.	"Sin City"	Gram Parsons, Chris Hillman	3:57
5.	"One of These Days"	Earl Montgomery	3:03
6.	"Till I Gain Control Again"	Rodney Crowell	5:40
7.	"Here, There and Everywhere"	John Lennon, Paul McCartney	3:59
8.	"Ooh Las Vegas"	Gram Parsons, Ric Grech	3:47
9.	"Sweet Dreams"	Don Gibson	4:03
10.	"Jambalaya (On the Bayou)"	Hank Williams	3:05
11.	"Satan's Jewel Crown"	Edgar L. Eden	3:13
12.	"Wheels" (with Jonathan Edwards)	Chris Hillman, Gram Parsons	3:13
13.	"You're Running Wild" (with Rodney Crowell) (bonus track for 2004 CD re-issue)	Ray Edenton, Don Winters	1:44
14.	"Cajun Born" (with Jo-El Sonnier) (bonus track for 2004 CD re-issue)	Jo-El Sonnier, Kermit Goell	3:19

== Personnel ==
- Emmylou Harris - vocals, acoustic guitar
- Brian Ahern - acoustic guitar, bass
- Mike Auldridge - dobro
- Byron Berline - fiddle, mandolin
- Dianne Brooks - backing vocals
- James Burton - electric guitar
- Rodney Crowell - electric guitar, backing vocals
- Rick Cunha - acoustic guitar
- Nick DeCaro - string arrangements
- Hank DeVito - pedal steel
- Jonathan Edwards - backing vocals
- Amos Garrett - electric guitar
- Emory Gordy Jr. - bass, backing vocals
- Glen Hardin - piano, electric piano, string arrangements
- Ben Keith - pedal steel
- Bernie Leadon - acoustic guitar, backing vocals
- Bill Payne - piano
- Herb Pedersen - acoustic guitar, banjo, backing vocals
- Mickey Raphael - harmonica
- Linda Ronstadt - backing vocals
- Fayssoux Starling - backing vocals
- John Starling - acoustic guitar, backing vocals
- Ron Tutt - drums
- John Ware - drums

Technical

- Brian Ahern - Producer, Engineer
- Bradley Hartman - Engineer
- Rudy Hill - Engineer
- Stuart Taylor - Engineer
- Miles Wilkinson - Engineer

== Charts ==
=== Weekly charts ===
Chart (1976)	Peak position
US Billboard 200	25
US Top Country Albums (Billboard)	1

=== Year-end charts ===
Chart (1976)	Position
US Billboard 200	97
US Top Country Albums (Billboard)	4

== Release history ==
Release history and formats for Elite Hotel
Region	Date	Format	Label	Ref.
North America	December 29, 1975	LP; cassette	Reprise Records	
