= At the Ryman =

Live album by Emmylou Harris and The Nash Ramblers
- Released: January 10, 1992
- Recorded: April 30–May 2, 1991
- Venues: Ryman Auditorium, Nashville, Tennessee
- Genre: Country
- Length: 60:46
- Label: Warner Bros. Nashville
- Producers: Allen Reynolds, Richard Bennett

Emmylou Harris and The Nash Ramblers chronology
Brand New Dance (1990)	At the Ryman (1992)	Cowgirl's Prayer (1993)

Emmylou Harris live chronology
Last Date (1982)	At the Ryman (1992)	Spyboy (1998)

Professional ratings
Review scores
Source	Rating
AllMusic	4/5 stars
Entertainment Weekly	A
Orlando Sentinel	3/3 stars
Robert Christgau	(2-star Honorable Mention)
Rolling Stone	(not rated)

At the Ryman is a 1992 live album by Emmylou Harris and her then-newly formed acoustic backing band, The Nash Ramblers, recorded at the one-time home of the Grand Ole Opry, Ryman Auditorium in Nashville, Tennessee.

The Nash Ramblers:

- Sam Bush – Fiddle, mandolin and vocals
- Roy Huskey Jr. – Double bass and vocals
- Larry Atamanuik – Drums
- Al Perkins – Banjo, guitar, resonator guitar and vocals
- John Randall Stewart – Guitar, mandolin and vocals

A companion video recording of the concert was released on VHS.

The concerts' and album's high acclaim are given credit for the renewed interest in reviving the Ryman Auditorium as an active venue after nearly 20 years of dormancy. Soon after, the building was completely renovated and has since become a concert hall.

The album won Harris and the Ramblers a Grammy Award for Best Country Performance by a Duo or Group with Vocal at the 34th ceremony. In 2017, At the Ryman was released on vinyl to celebrate 25 years since the original release, Harris reunited with the Nash Ramblers to perform the album in its entirety.

== Track listing ==
Original album
No.	Title	Writer(s)	Length
1.	"Guitar Town"	Steve Earle	2:56
2.	"Half as Much"	Curley Williams	3:00
3.	"Cattle Call"	Tex Owens	3:11
4.	"Guess Things Happen That Way"	Jack Clement	2:25
5.	"Hard Times"	Stephen Foster	3:25
6.	"Mansion on the Hill"	Bruce Springsteen	4:25
7.	"Scotland"	Bill Monroe	2:57
8.	"Montana Cowgirl"	Ray Park	3:08
9.	"Like Strangers"	Boudleaux Bryant	4:56
10.	"Lodi"	John Fogerty	3:06
11.	"Calling My Children Home"	Doyle Lawson, Charles Waller, Robert Yates	3:14
12.	"If I Could Be There"	Kieran Kane, Jamie O'Hara	3:30
13.	"Walls of Time"	Bill Monroe, Peter Rowan	4:45
14.	"Get Up John"	Bill Monroe, Marty Stuart, Jerry Sullivan	4:25
15.	"It's a Hard Life Wherever You Go" / "Abraham, Martin and John"	Nanci Griffith / Richard Holler	7:07
16.	"Smoke Along the Track"	Alan Rose	4:16
Total length:			60:46

2017 remaster bonus tracks
No.	Title	Writer(s)	Length
17.	"Rollin' and Ramblin' (The Death of Hank Williams)"	Robin Williams, Linda Williams / Jerome Clark	3:34
18.	"The Nash Ramble"	Emmylou Harris, Larry Atamanuik, Roy Huskey Jr., Sam Bush, Al Perkins & Jon Randall Stewart	3:34
Total length:			67:54

== Chart performance ==
Chart (1992)	Peak position
U.S. Billboard Top Country Albums	32
U.S. Billboard 200	184

== Release history ==
Release history and formats for At the Ryman
Region	Date	Format	Label	Ref.
North America	January 10, 1992	CD; cassette	Warner Bros. Nashville	
