= Luxury Liner (album) =

Studio album by Emmylou Harris
- Released: December 28, 1976
- Studios: Enactron Truck, Los Angeles, California
- Genre: Country
- Length: 38:56
- Label: Warner Bros. Nashville
- Producer: Brian Ahern

Emmylou Harris chronology
Elite Hotel (1975)	Luxury Liner (1976)	Quarter Moon in a Ten Cent Town (1978)

Singles from Luxury Liner
- 1. "You Never Can Tell (C'est La Vie)" Released: February 2, 1977

Professional ratings
Review scores
Source	Rating
AllMusic	4.5/5 stars
Christgau's Record Guide	B
The Guardian	3/5 stars

Luxury Liner is the fourth studio album by American country music artist Emmylou Harris, released in 1976. The album was Harris' second successive number one country album on the Billboard charts, although, unlike the preceding Elite Hotel, there were no number one hits from this album. The highest-charting singles were the number six Chuck Berry cover "(You Never Can Tell) C'est la Vie" and the number eight "Making Believe" (originally a hit for Kitty Wells). However, the album may be better known for including the first cover version of Townes Van Zandt's 1972 song "Pancho and Lefty", which subsequently became Van Zandt's best-known composition.

At the 20th Annual Grammy Awards, one of the album's tracks and hit singles, "Making Believe", was nominated for Best Female Country Vocal Performance but the award went to Crystal Gayle for "Don't It Make My Brown Eyes Blue".

== Track listing ==
No.	Title	Writer(s)	Length
1.	"Luxury Liner"	Gram Parsons	3:41
2.	"Pancho and Lefty"	Townes Van Zandt	4:50
3.	"Making Believe"	Jimmy Work	3:37
4.	"You're Supposed to Be Feeling Good"	Rodney Crowell	4:01
5.	"I'll Be Your San Antone Rose"	Susanna Clark	3:43
6.	"(You Never Can Tell) C'est la Vie"	Chuck Berry	3:27
7.	"When I Stop Dreaming"	Ira Louvin, Charlie Louvin	3:15
8.	"Hello Stranger" (with Nicolette Larson)	A.P. Carter	3:59
9.	"She"	Gram Parsons, Chris Ethridge	3:15
10.	"Tulsa Queen"	Emmylou Harris, Rodney Crowell	4:47
11.	"Me and Willie" (bonus track for 2004 CD re-issue)	Laurie Hyde-Smith	5:16
12.	"Night Flyer" (duet with Delia Bell) (bonus track for 2004 CD re-issue)	Johnny Mullins	3:33

== Personnel ==
Credits adapted from the liner notes of Luxury Liner.

- Brian Ahern - acoustic guitar, electric guitar, finger-style acoustic guitar
- Mike Auldridge - dobro
- Dianne Brooks - backing vocals
- James Burton - electric guitar
- Rodney Crowell - acoustic guitar, electric guitar, high-strung guitar, backing vocals
- Rick Cunha - acoustic guitar
- Hank DeVito - pedal steel guitar
- Emory Gordy Jr. - bass
- Glen Hardin - piano, electric piano, string arrangements
- Emmylou Harris - vocals, acoustic guitar
- Nicolette Larson - duet vocals
- Albert Lee - acoustic guitar, electric guitar, mandolin, backing vocals
- Dolly Parton - backing vocals
- Herb Pedersen - backing vocals
- Mickey Raphael - harmonica, bass harmonica
- Ricky Skaggs - fiddle, mandolin
- Fayssoux Starling - backing vocals
- John Ware - drums

Technical

- Brian Ahern - production, engineering
- Donivan Cowart - engineering
- Bradley Hartman - engineering
- Stuart Taylor - engineering
- Miles Wilkinson - engineering

== Charts ==
=== Weekly charts ===
Chart (1977)	Peak position
Canadian Albums (RPM)	40
US Billboard 200	21
US Top Country Albums (Billboard)	1

=== Year-end charts ===
Chart (1977)	Position
US Top Country Albums (Billboard)	2

== Release history ==
Release history and formats for Luxury Liner
Region	Date	Format	Label	Ref.
North America	28 December 1976	LP · cassette · 8-track cartridge	Warner Bros. Records	
UK	14 January 1977	LP; cassette	Warner Bros. Records	
