= Gliding Bird =

Studio album by Emmy Lou Harris
- Released: January 23, 1970
- Recorded: 1969
- Genre: Folk
- Label: Jubilee
- Producers: Ray Ellis, Mickey Eichner (executive producer)

Emmy Lou Harris chronology
Gliding Bird (1970)	Pieces of the Sky (1975)

Professional ratings
Review scores
Source	Rating
AllMusic	2/5 stars

Gliding Bird is the debut studio album by American country music singer-songwriter Emmylou Harris, released in 1970 on Jubilee Records (JGS-8031.) Her first name was shown as two words ("Emmy Lou") on the jacket.

Before she met mentor Gram Parsons and became a famous country singer, Harris was singing folk music; yet Gliding Bird displays an eclecticism that is found in her later work. The album contains five folky Harris originals (with influences from Joan Baez. Judy Collins and Joni Mitchell) plus the country rock of Bob Dylan and Fred Neil, classic country of Hank Williams and a folk-pop rendition of a Dionne Warwick/Bacharach/David hit. Not until 1985's The Ballad of Sally Rose would another Harris album contain more than two of her own compositions.

Jubilee Records folded shortly after the release of this album, thus ceasing any distribution or promotion; its catalogue was purchased by Roulette Records. Neither of the singles released from the album made any of the Billboard Music Charts. The title song "Gliding Bird," was written by her then-husband, Tom Slocum. The album was later released on the Emus label as ES-12052, with a different cover.

Though technically Harris' first album, she subsequently disowned the record and regards 1975's Pieces of the Sky as her first "official" album. However, in 2007 on the Songbird boxed set of rare material from Rhino Records, an alternate, slightly shorter take of the song "Clocks" from the Gliding Bird sessions finally saw the light of day.

== Track listing ==
No.	Title	Writer(s)	Length
1.	"I'll Be Your Baby Tonight"	Bob Dylan	2:45
2.	"Fugue for the Ox"	Emmylou Harris	2:23
3.	"I Saw the Light"	Hank Williams	2:40
4.	"Clocks"	Emmylou Harris	3:00
5.	"Black Gypsy"	Emmylou Harris	5:50
6.	"Gliding Bird"	Tom Slocum	2:50
7.	"Everybody's Talkin'"	Fred Neil	2:03
8.	"Bobbie's Gone"	Emmylou Harris	4:05
9.	"I'll Never Fall in Love Again"	Burt Bacharach, Hal David	2:22
10.	"Waltz of the Magic Man"	Emmylou Harris	4:15

== Personnel ==
- Ray Ellis – producer, arrangements
- Mickey Eichner – executive producer
- Souren Mozian – recording engineer
- The Graffiteria – cover design, photography

== Release history ==
Release history and formats for Gliding Bird
Region	Date	Format	Label	Ref.
North America	January 23, 1970	LP	Jubilee Records	
