= The Ballad of Sally Rose =

Studio album by Emmylou Harris
- Released: February 25, 1985
- Recorded: 1984
- Studios: Treasure Isle Recorders, Nashville, Tennessee
- Genre: Country
- Length: 36:12
- Label: Warner Bros. Nashville
- Producer: Paul Kennerley

Emmylou Harris chronology
| White Shoes (1983) | The Ballad of Sally Rose (1985) | Thirteen (1986) |

Singles from The Ballad of Sally Rose
- 1. "White Line" Released: February 1985; 2. "Rhythm Guitar" Released: June 1985; 3. "Timberline" Released: October 1985

The Ballad of Sally Rose is the eleventh studio album by American singer Emmylou Harris released in February 1985. It represented a significant departure for Harris, in that all the songs were written by her and her then-husband Paul Kennerley, whereas her previous albums had consisted mostly of others' material. Additionally, it is a concept album, loosely based on Harris' relationship with Gram Parsons. The album tells the story of a character named Sally Rose, a singer whose lover and mentor, a hard-living, hard-drinking musician, is killed while on the road. Harris cited Bruce Springsteen's Nebraska (1982) as a major influence on the album. Dolly Parton and Linda Ronstadt sing harmony on several of the songs, while Waylon Jennings played lead guitar on "Rhythm Guitar".

Prior to this album, only Harris' 1969 debut Gliding Bird had more than two of her own compositions, a feat she would not repeat until Red Dirt Girl in 2000. Harris has described the album as a "country opera".

== Reception ==
Professional ratings
Review scores
| Source | Rating |
|---|---|
| AllMusic | 4/5 stars |

In a BBC Radio 2 programme recounting her career in 2006, Harris related how the album was a commercial "disaster" upon its release, its relative failure meaning that she would have to work "for money" again. Two singles from the album performed disappointingly by Harris' standards, although the single "White Line" was a reasonable success, reaching No. 14 on the country charts.

The Ballad of Sally Rose was nominated for the Grammy Award for Best Female Country Vocal Performance.

In a retrospective review for AllMusic, Mark Deming praised Harris' songwriting, the production, and the backing vocals by Parton and Ronstadt. He believed that "lack of an obvious single" led to its commercial failure on release, but it nevertheless remains one of Harris' "most heartfelt and personal works", one that anticipated her later acclaimed works Wrecking Ball (1995) and Red Dirt Girl (2000).

== Reissue ==
On June 1, 2018, the album was reissued as an expanded edition by Rhino Records, featuring previously unreleased demo recordings. It was released in 2-CD, 2-LP, and digital download editions, with physical editions having new liner notes written by Colin Escott.

== Track listing ==
All tracks composed by Emmylou Harris and Paul Kennerley; except where indicated

| No. | Title | Writer(s) | Length |
|---|---|---|---|
| 1. | "The Ballad of Sally Rose" | | 2:48 |
| 2. | "Rhythm Guitar" | | 3:18 |
| 3. | "I Think I Love Him" / Instrumental: "You Are My Flower" | Harris / A.P. Carter | 1:07 |
| 4. | "Heart to Heart" | | 2:31 |
| 5. | "Woman Walk the Line" | | 4:08 |
| 6. | "Bad News" | | 1:46 |
| 7. | "Timberline" | | 2:51 |
| 8. | "Long Tall Sally Rose" | | 1:32 |
| 9. | "White Line" | | 3:46 |
| 10. | "Diamond in My Crown" | | 2:55 |
| 11. | "The Sweetheart of the Rodeo" | | 3:41 |
| 12. | "K-S-O-S"/instrumental medley: "Ring of Fire"/"Wildwood Flower"/"Six Days on the Road" | Harris, Kennerley; June Carter, Merle Kilgore, A.P. Carter, Earl Greene, Carl Montgomery | 2:50 |
| 13. | "Sweet Chariot" | | 2:58 |

== Personnel ==
- Steve Cash – Harmonica
- Barbara Cowart – Backing Vocals
- Gail Davies – Backing Vocals
- Hank DeVito – Acoustic Guitar, Electric Guitar, Pedal Steel, Dobro
- Philip Donnelly – Electric Slide Guitar
- Bessyl Duhon – Accordion
- Ray Flacke – Electric Guitar
- Vince Gill – Electric Guitar, Backing Vocals
- Emory Gordy Jr. – Acoustic Guitar, Bass, String Arrangements
- Emmylou Harris – Vocals, Acoustic Guitar, Backing Vocals
- John Jarvis – Keyboards
- Waylon Jennings – Electric Guitar
- Shane Keister – Keyboards
- Paul Kennerley – Acoustic Guitar, Electric Guitar
- Russ Kunkel – Drums
- Albert Lee – Acoustic Guitar, Electric Guitar, Mandolin
- Larrie Londin – Drums, Percussion
- Dolly Parton – Backing Vocals
- Tom Roady – Percussion
- Linda Ronstadt – Backing Vocals
- Gary Scruggs – Harmonica
- Buddy Spicher – Fiddle
- Barry Tashian – Acoustic Guitar
- Bobby Thompson – Acoustic Guitar, Banjo

== Technical personnel ==
- Donivan Cowart – Engineer
- Tom Harding – Second Engineer
- Emmylou Harris – Producer
- Paul Kennerley – Producer
- Keith Odle – Second Engineer

== Charts ==
=== Weekly charts ===
| Chart (1985) | Peak position |
|---|---|
| US Billboard 200 | 171 |
| US Top Country Albums (Billboard) | 8 |

=== Year-end charts ===
| Chart (1985) | Position |
|---|---|
| US Top Country Albums (Billboard) | 24 |

== Release history ==
Release history and formats for The Ballad of Sally Rose
| Region | Date | Format | Label | Ref. |
|---|---|---|---|---|
| North America | February 25, 1985 | LP; CD; cassette | Warner Bros. Records | |
