= Emmylou Harris singles discography =

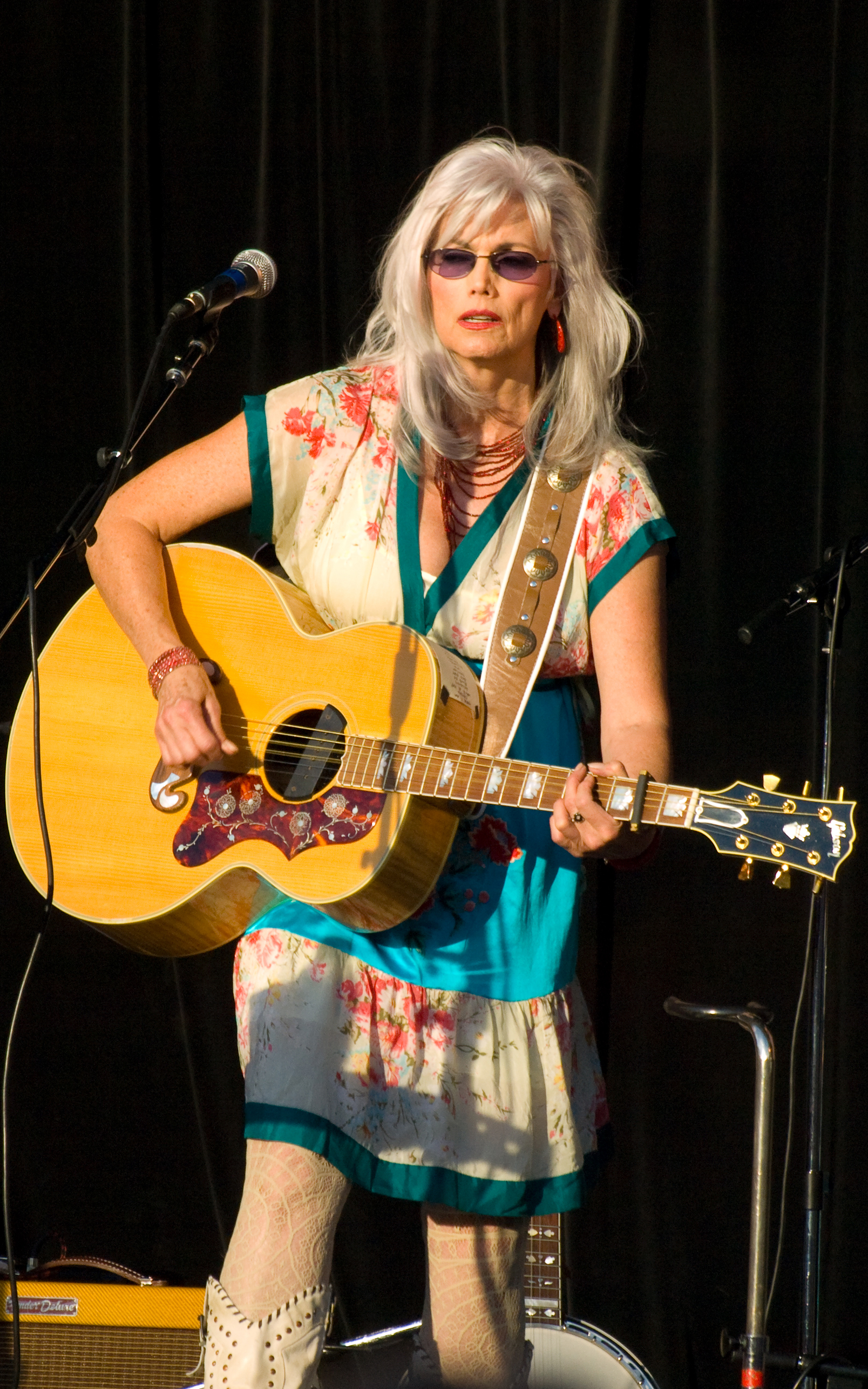
- Emmylou Harris in 2008
- Music videos: 14
- Lead artist singles: 58
- Collaborative singles: 11
- Featured artist singles: 13
- Promotional singles: 6
- Other charted songs: 2

The singles discography of American singer–songwriter Emmylou Harris contains 58 singles issued as a solo artist, 11 issued in collaboration with other artists, 13 issued as a featured artist and six promotional singles. Her singles discography also contains two other charted songs and 14 music videos that were released in conjunction with singles and songs.

Harris's first single to chart was 1975's "Too Far Gone". However, it was her next single "If I Could Only Win Your Love" that reached the top ten of America's Billboard Hot Country Songs chart. It also topped Canada's RPM country chart and made the Billboard Hot 100. The 1976 single "Together Again" was Harris's first to reach number one on the Billboard country chart. It also made the top 20 on the Belgian and Dutch pop charts.

Harris topped the Billboard and RPM country charts four more times through 1978 with "Sweet Dreams", "Making Believe", "To Daddy" and "Two More Bottles of Wine". Additionally "One of These Days", "You Never Can Tell", "Save the Last Dance for Me" and "Blue Kentucky Girl" made the American and Canadian country top ten through 1979.

In 1980, "Beneath Still Waters" topped the Billboard and RPM country charts. "That Lovin' You Feelin' Again", a duet with Roy Orbison was a top ten country and adult contemporary single, while also becoming her second to make the Hot 100. In 1981, "Mister Sandman" became Harris's only top 40 Hot 100 entry, while also reaching multiple chart positions internationally. Through 1984, further singles reached the Billboard and RPM top ten including "Tennessee Rose", "Born to Run" and "Pledging My Love".

The 1982 single "(Lost His Love) On Our Last Date" went topped the Billboard country chart. In 1987, Harris collaborated alongside Dolly Parton and Linda Ronstadt for three top ten singles beginning with "To Know Him Is to Love Him". In 1989, Harris had a solo top ten single with "Heartbreak Hill". Harris's solo singles continued making the American and Canadian country charts through 1994. Her final to do so was "Thanks to You", which peaked outside the top 40 in both countries. Reuniting with Parton and Ronstadt in 1999, their single "High Sierra" made the RPM country chart. During this period a duet between Harris and Ronstadt called "Feels Like Home" made RPM's adult contemporary chart.

Harris was featured on several singles during this period including Southern Pacific's "Thing About You" and Earl Thomas Conley's "We Believe in Happy Endings". The latter topped the country charts in the United States and Canada. During the 1990s and 2000s, Harris's solo studio albums spawned mostly non-charting singles. A collaborative single between Mark Knopfler and Harris called "This Is Us" reached the top five on the Billboard Adult Alternative Airplay chart in 2006.

== Singles as lead artist ==
List of lead artist singles, with selected chart positions, showing other relevant details
Title	Year	Peak chart positions										Album
Title	Year	US	US AC	US Cou.	AUS	BEL	CAN	CAN AC	CAN Cou.	GER	ND	Album
"I'll Be Your Baby Tonight"	1969	—	—	—	—	—	—	—	—	—	—	Gliding Bird
"Paddy"	1970	—	—	—	—	—	—	—	—	—	—	Gliding Bird
"Too Far Gone"	1975	—	—	73	—	—	—	—	—	—	—	Pieces of the Sky
"If I Could Only Win Your Love"	1975	58	—	4	—	—	—	—	1	—	—	Pieces of the Sky
"Together Again"	1976	—	—	1	—	19	—	—	3	—	15	Elite Hotel
"One of These Days"	1976	—	—	3	—	—	—	—	2	—	—	Elite Hotel
"Sweet Dreams"	1976	—	—	1	—	—	—	—	1	—	—	Elite Hotel
"(You Never Can Tell) C'est La Vie"	1977	—	—	6	—	5	—	—	4	45	4	Luxury Liner
"Making Believe"	1977	—	—	8	—	—	87	—	1	—	—	Luxury Liner
"To Daddy"	1977	— (Note: "To Daddy" did not enter the Hot 100, but peaked at number 2 on Bubbling Under Hot 100 Singles, which acts as a 25-song extension of the Hot 100)	—	3	—	—	—	—	1	—	—	Quarter Moon in a Ten Cent Town
"Two More Bottles of Wine"	1978	—	—	1	—	—	—	—	1	—	—	Quarter Moon in a Ten Cent Town
"Easy From Now On"	1978	—	—	12	—	—	—	—	5	—	—	Quarter Moon in a Ten Cent Town
"Too Far Gone" (Note: "Too Far Gone" was re-released as the lead single from Harris's 1978 compilation Profile: Best of Emmylou Harris and reached new chart positions.)	1978	—	—	13	—	—	—	—	12	—	—	Profile: Best of Emmylou Harris
"Save the Last Dance for Me"	1979	—	—	4	81	—	—	—	20	—	—	Blue Kentucky Girl
"Blue Kentucky Girl"	1979	—	—	6	—	—	—	—	7	—	—	Blue Kentucky Girl
"Beneath Still Waters"	1980	—	—	1	—	—	—	—	1	—	—	Blue Kentucky Girl
"Wayfaring Stranger"	1980	—	—	7	—	—	—	10	1	—	—	Roses in the Snow
"That Lovin' You Feeling Again" (with Roy Orbison)	1980	55	10	6	97	—	—	31	3	—	—	Roadie
"The Boxer"	1980	—	—	13	—	—	—	—	8	—	—	Roses in the Snow
"Mister Sandman"	1981	37	8	10	19	8	42	—	1	14	9	Evangeline
"I Don't Have to Crawl"	1981	— (Note: "I Don't Have to Crawl" did not enter the Hot 100, but peaked at number 6 on Bubbling Under Hot 100 Singles, which acts as a 25-song extension of the Hot 100)	—	44	—	—	—	—	34	—	—	Evangeline
"If I Needed You" (with Don Williams)	1981	—	—	3	—	—	—	—	1	—	—	Cimarron
"Tennessee Rose"	1981	—	—	9	—	—	—	—	5	—	—	Cimarron
"Born to Run"	1982	—	—	3	—	—	—	—	10	—	—	Cimarron
"(Lost His Love) On Our Last Date"	1982	—	—	1	—	—	—	—	3	—	—	Last Date
"I'm Movin' On"	1983	—	—	5	—	—	—	—	1	—	—	Last Date
"So Sad (To Watch Good Love Go Bad)"	1983	—	—	28	—	—	—	—	14	—	—	Last Date
"Drivin' Wheel"	1983	—	—	26	—	—	—	—	13	—	—	White Shoes
"In My Dreams"	1984	—	—	9	—	—	—	—	6	—	—	White Shoes
"Pledging My Love"	1984	—	—	9	—	—	—	—	9	—	—	White Shoes
"Someone Like You"	1984	—	—	26	—	—	—	—	14	—	—	Profile II: The Best of Emmylou Harris
"White Line"	1985	—	—	14	—	—	—	—	6	—	—	The Ballad of Sally Rose
"Rhythm Guitar"	1985	—	—	44	—	—	—	—	49	—	—	The Ballad of Sally Rose
"Timberline"	1985	—	—	55	—	—	—	—	—	—	—	The Ballad of Sally Rose
"I Had My Heart Set on You"	1986	—	—	60	—	—	—	—	36	—	—	Thirteen
"Today I Started Loving You Again"	1986	—	—	43	—	—	—	—	49	—	—	Thirteen
"Someday My Ship Will Sail"	1987	—	—	60	—	—	—	—	42	—	—	Angel Band
"Back in Baby's Arms"	1988	—	—	53	—	—	—	—	54	—	—	Planes, Trains and Automobiles
"Heartbreak Hill"	1988	—	—	8	—	—	—	—	3	—	—	Bluebird
"Heaven Only Knows"	1989	—	—	16	—	—	—	—	16	—	—	Bluebird
"I Still Miss Someone"	1989	—	—	51	—	—	—	—	—	—	—	Bluebird
"Gulf Coast Highway" (with Willie Nelson)	1990	—	—	—	—	—	—	—	52	—	—	Duets
"Never Be Anyone Else But You"	1990	—	—	—	—	—	—	—	92	—	—	Brand New Dance
"Wheels of Love"	1990	—	—	71	—	—	—	—	84	—	—	Brand New Dance
"Rollin' and Ramblin' (The Death of Hank Williams)"	1991	—	—	—	—	—	—	—	—	—	—	Brand New Dance
"High Powered Love"	1993	—	—	63	—	—	—	—	62	—	—	Cowgirl's Prayer
"Thanks to You"	1994	—	—	65	—	—	—	—	84	—	—	Cowgirl's Prayer
"You Don't Know Me"	1994	—	—	—	—	—	—	—	—	—	—	Cowgirl's Prayer
"Crescent City"	1994	—	—	—	—	—	—	—	—	—	—	Cowgirl's Prayer
"Where Will I Be"	1995	—	—	—	—	—	—	—	—	—	—	Wrecking Ball
"Goodbye"	1996	—	—	—	—	—	—	—	—	—	—	Wrecking Ball
"Wrecking Ball"	1996	—	—	—	—	—	—	—	—	—	—	Wrecking Ball
"Love Hurts"	1998	—	—	—	—	—	—	—	—	—	—	Spyboy
"One Big Love"	2000	—	—	—	—	—	—	—	—	—	—	Red Dirt Girl
"I Don't Wanna Talk About It Now" (Note: "I Don't Wanna Talk About It Now" charted only on the Billboard Adult Alternative Airplay chart, peaking at number 33.)	2000	—	—	—	—	—	—	—	—	—	—	Red Dirt Girl
"Here I Am"	2003	—	—	—	—	—	—	—	—	—	—	Stumble into Grace
"Not Enough"	2008	—	—	—	—	—	—	—	—	—	—	All I Intended to Be
"The Road"	2011	—	—	—	—	—	—	—	—	—	—	Hard Bargain
"—" denotes a recording that did not chart or was not released in that territory.

== Singles as a collaborative artist ==
List of collaborative singles, with selected chart positions, showing other relevant details
Title	Year	Peak chart positions							Album
Title	Year	US AC	US AAA	US Cou.	AUS	CAN Cou.	ND	NOR	Album
"To Know Him Is to Love Him" (with Dolly Parton and Linda Ronstadt)	1987	—	—	1	54	1	62	—	Trio
"Telling Me Lies" (with Dolly Parton and Linda Ronstadt)	1987	35	—	3	—	6	—	—	Trio
"Those Memories of You" (with Dolly Parton and Linda Ronstadt)	1987	—	—	5	—	1	—	—	Trio
"Wildflowers" (with Dolly Parton and Linda Ronstadt)	1988	—	—	6	—	8	—	—	Trio
"High Sierra" (with Dolly Parton and Linda Ronstadt)	1999	—	—	—	—	90	—	—	Trio II
"After the Gold Rush" (with Dolly Parton and Linda Ronstadt)	1999	—	—	—	—	—	—	—	Trio II
"For a Dancer" (with Linda Ronstadt)	1999	—	—	—	—	—	—	—	Western Wall: The Tucson Sessions
"Sweet Spot" (with Linda Ronstadt)	1999	—	—	—	—	—	—	—	Western Wall: The Tucson Sessions
"All the Roadrunning" (with Mark Knopfler)	2005	—	—	—	—	—	—	—	All the Roadrunning
"This Is Us" (with Mark Knopfler)	2006	—	5	—	—	—	—	17	All the Roadrunning
"Beachcombing" (with Mark Knopfler)	2006	—	—	—	—	—	—	—	All the Roadrunning
"—" denotes a recording that did not chart or was not released in that territory.

== Singles as a featured artist ==
List of featured singles, with selected chart positions, showing other relevant details
Title	Year	Peak chart positions				Album
Title	Year	US AC	US Cou.	CAN AC	CAN Cou.	Album
"Play Together Again Again" (Buck Owens with Emmylou Harris)	1979	—	11	—	44	—N/a
"Love Don't Care" (Charlie Louvin featuring Emmylou Harris)	1979	—	91	—	—	—N/a
"Wild Montana Skies" (John Denver featuring Emmylou Harris)	1983	26	14	14	15	It's About Time
"Thing About You" (Southern Pacific with Emmylou Harris)	1985	—	14	—	14	Southern Pacific
"We Believe in Happy Endings" (Earl Thomas Conley with Emmylou Harris)	1988	—	1	—	1	The Heart of It All
"All Fall Down" (George Jones with Emmylou Harris)	1991	—	—	—	84	Friends in High Places
"Feels Like Home" (Linda Ronstadt with Emmylou Harris)	1995	—	—	43	—	Feels Like Home
"Only a Woman's Heart" (Mary Black with Emmylou Harris)	1995	—	—	—	—	Circus
"Same Old Train" (credited with various artists) (Note: All-star collaboration featuring Clint Black, Joe Diffie, Merle Haggard, Emmylou Harris, Alison Krauss, Patty Loveless, Earl Scruggs, Ricky Skaggs, Marty Stuart, Pam Tillis, Randy Travis, Travis Tritt and Dwight Yoakam.)	1998	—	59	—	—	Tribute to Tradition
"Not Me" (Keni Thomas with Vince Gill and Emmylou Harris)	2005	—	47	—	—	Flags of Our Fathers: A Soldier's Story
"The Way I'm Watching You" (Snowracer with Emmylou Harris)	2005	—	—	—	—	—N/a
"Boulder to Birmingham" (The Fray featuring Emmylou Harris)	2010	—	—	—	—	Scars & Stories
"Prayer" (Barbara Cowart featuring Emmylou Harris)	2021	—	—	—	—	—N/a
"—" denotes a recording that did not chart or was not released in that territory.

== Promotional singles ==
List of promotional singles, with selected chart positions, showing other relevant details
Title	Year	Peak chart positions	Album
Title	Year	US Country	Album
"Light of the Stable"	1975	99	Light of the Stable
"The First Noel"	1979	—	Light of the Stable
"Tennessee Waltz"	1980	—	Cimarron
"Little Drummer Boy"	1980	—	Light of the Stable
"Rose of Cimarron"	1982	—	Cimarron
"Going Back to Harlan 'Live'"	1996	—	—N/a
"—" denotes a recording that did not chart or was not released in that territory.

== Other charted songs ==
List of songs, with selected chart positions, showing other relevant details
Title	Year	Peak chart positions						Album	Notes
Title	Year	US	US AC	US Cou.	CAN	CAN AC	UK	Album	Notes
"The Sweetest Gift" (with Linda Ronstadt)	1975	—	—	12	—	—	—	Prisoner in Disguise	(Note: Released as the B-side to Linda Ronstadt's single "The Tracks of My Tears".)
"Here, There and Everywhere"	1976	65	13	—	48	5	30	Elite Hotel	(Note: Released as the B-side to the 1976 single "Together Again".)
"—" denotes a recording that did not chart or was not released in that territory.

== Music videos for singles and songs ==
List of music videos, showing year released and director
Title	Year	Director(s)	Ref.
"Mister Sandman"	1981	Ethan Allen Productions	
"I Don't Have to Crawl"	1981	Ethan Allen Productions	
"To Know Him Is To Love Him" (with Dolly Parton and Linda Ronstadt)	1987	George Lucas	
"Those Memories of You" (with Dolly Parton and Linda Ronstadt)	1987	White Copeman	
"Wheels of Love"	1991	—N/a	
"Rollin' and Ramblin' (The Death of Hank Williams)"	1991	—N/a	
"High Powered Love"	1993	Martin Kahan	
"Thanks to You"	1993	Rocky Schenck	
"Crescent City"	1994	Martin Kahan	
"He Thinks He'll Keep Her" (with Mary Chapin Carpenter with various artists)	1994	Bud Schaetzle	
"Love Hurts"	1999	—N/a	
"After the Gold Rush" (with Dolly Parton and Linda Ronstadt)	1999	Jim Shea	
"Not Enough"	2008	—N/a	
"Goodnight Old World"	2011	Jack Spencer	
