= List of awards and nominations received by Emmylou Harris =

Emmylou Harris awards and nominations
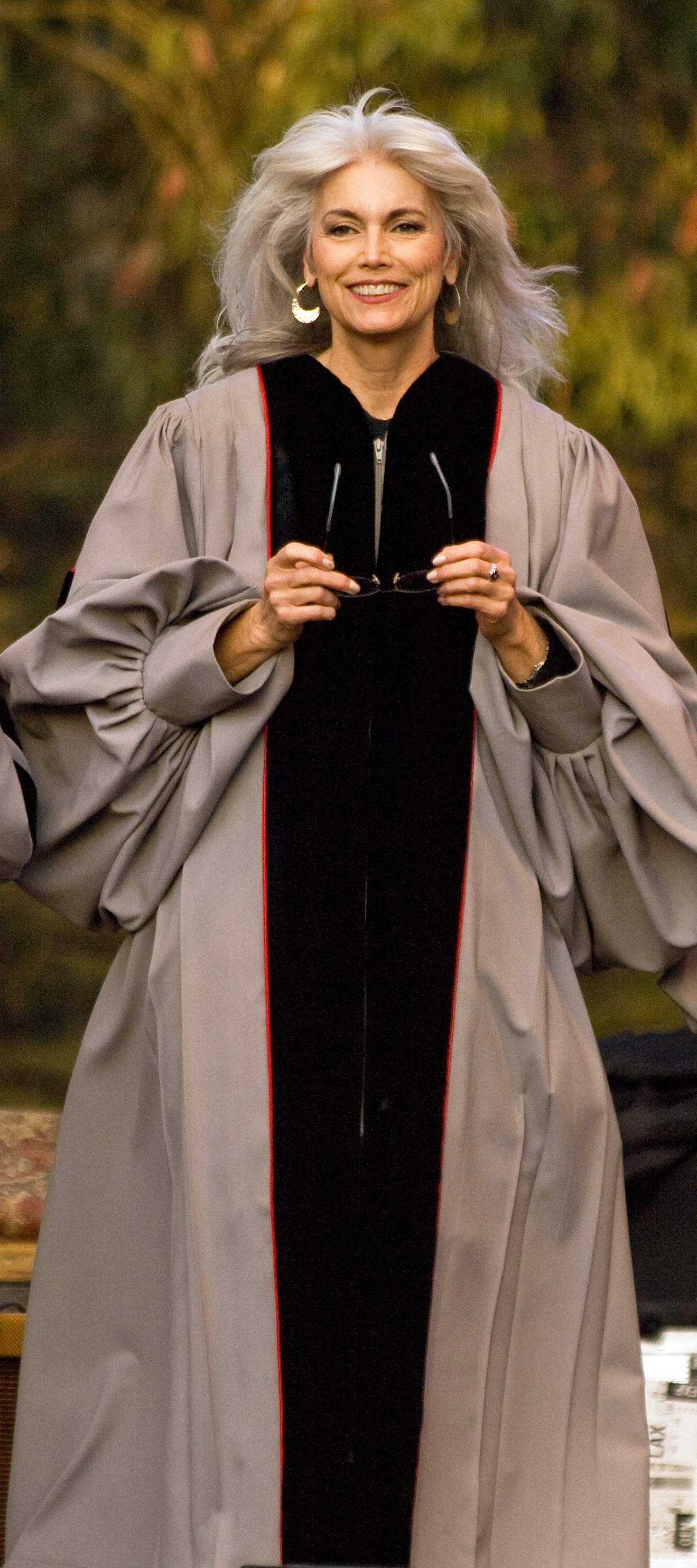
- Harris receiving an honorary doctorate from the Berklee College of Music in 2009.
Awards and nominations
| Award | Wins | Nominations |
| Academy of Country Music | 2 | 10 |
| Country Music Association | 3 | 19 |
| Grammy Awards | 14 | 34 |

American singer, songwriter and musician Emmylou Harris has been awarded on numerous occasions for her work. She received 14 accolades from the Grammy Awards, beginning in 1977 for her album Elite Hotel. She also won awards from the Grammy's for her work with other artists, including one with Roy Orbison and another for the Trio album with Dolly Parton and Linda Ronstadt. She has been nominated by the Grammy Awards a total of 34 times. Harris also received multiple awards and nominations from the Country Music Association. In 1980, she won the Female Vocalist of the Year award. This was followed in 1988 for the Vocal Event of the Year award for her work with Parton and Ronstadt. Along with various artists, Harris won the Album of the Year award in 2000 for her contributions to the soundtrack of O Brother, Where Art Thou?.

Harris has also been nominated ten times by the Academy of Country Music. Her first accolade from the ACM's came with the 1987 Trio album. In 2011, she won the Cliffie Stone Pioneer Award. She was also nominated multiple times for Top Female Vocalist and Vocal Event of the Year. Harris also received four awards from the Americana Music Honors & Awards. This included two wins for Duo/Group of the Year for her work with Rodney Crowell. Music magazines Cashbox and Record World gave Harris nominations for Top Female Vocalist. Other honors include receiving an honorary doctorate from the Berklee College of Music, being inducted into the Country Music Hall of Fame and Museum and the Billboard Century Award.

== American Academy of Achievement ==
| Year | Nominee / work | Award | Result | Ref. |
|---|---|---|---|---|
| 2004 | Emmylou Harris | Golden Plate Award | Won | |

== American Academy of Arts and Science ==
| Year | Nominee / work | Award | Result | Ref. |
|---|---|---|---|---|
| 2009 | Emmylou Harris | American Academy of Arts and Science | Inducted | |

== Academy of Country Music Awards ==
| Year | Nominee / work | Award | Result | Ref. |
|---|---|---|---|---|
| 1975 | Emmylou Harris | Most Promising Female Vocalist | Nominated | |
| 1976 | Emmylou Harris | Top Female Vocalist of the Year | Nominated | |
| 1977 | Emmylou Harris | Top Female Vocalist of the Year | Nominated | |
| 1979 | Blue Kentucky Girl | Album of the Year | Nominated | |
| 1980 | Emmylou Harris | Top Female Vocalist | Nominated | |
| 1981 | Don Williams and Emmylou Harris | Top Vocal Duet | Nominated | |
| 1981 | Emmylou Harris | Top Female Vocalist | Nominated | |
| 1984 | Emmylou Harris | Top Female Vocalist | Nominated | |
| 1987 | Trio (with Dolly Parton and Linda Ronstadt) | Album of the Year | Won | |
| 1998 | "Same Old Train" (with various artists) | Vocal Event of the Year | Nominated | |
| 2003 | "Young Man's Town" (with Vince Gill) | Vocal Event of the Year | Nominated | |
| 2011 | Emmylou Harris | Cliffie Stone Pioneer Award | Won | |

== Alabama Music Hall of Fame ==
| Year | Nominee / work | Award | Result | Ref. |
|---|---|---|---|---|
| 2003 | Emmylou Harris | Alabama Music Hall of Fame | Inducted | |

== Americana Music Honors & Awards ==
| Year | Nominee / work | Award | Result | Ref. |
|---|---|---|---|---|
| 2002 | Emmylou Harris | Lifetime Achievement for Performance | Won | |
| 2013 | Old Yellow Moon (with Rodney Crowell) | Album of the Year | Won | |
| 2013 | Emmylou Harris | Artist of the Year | Nominated | |
| 2013 | Emmylou Harris and Rodney Crowell | Duo/Group of the Year | Won | |
| 2016 | Emmylou Harris and Rodney Crowell | Duo/Group of the Year | Won | |

== American Music Awards ==
| Year | Nominee / work | Award | Result | Ref. |
|---|---|---|---|---|
| 1982 | Emmylou Harris | Favorite Female Country Artist | Nominated | |
| 1983 | Emmylou Harris | Favorite Female Country Artist | Nominated | |

== Berklee College of Music ==
| Year | Nominee / work | Award | Result | Ref. |
|---|---|---|---|---|
| 2009 | Emmylou Harris | Honorary Doctorate of Music | Won | |

== Billboard Music Awards ==
| Year | Nominee / work | Award | Result | Ref. |
|---|---|---|---|---|
| 1999 | Emmylou Harris | Billboard Century Award | Won | |

== Cashbox Awards ==
| Year | Nominee / work | Award | Result | Ref. |
|---|---|---|---|---|
| 1976 | Emmylou Harris | Top Female Vocalist – Singles | Nominated | |
| 1980 | Emmylou Harris | Top Female Vocalist – Singles | Nominated | |
| 1980 | Emmylou Harris and Roy Orbison | Top New Duo | Nominated | |
| 1981 | Emmylou Harris | Top Female Vocalist – Singles | Nominated | |
| 1982 | Emmylou Harris and Don Williams | Top New Country Duo | Won | |
| 1989 | Emmylou Harris | Female Vocalist of the Year | Nominated | |

== Country Music Association Awards ==
| Year | Nominee / work | Award | Result | Ref. |
|---|---|---|---|---|
| 1976 | Emmylou Harris | Female Vocalist of the Year | Nominated | |
| 1977 | Emmylou Harris | Female Vocalist of the Year | Nominated | |
| 1978 | Emmylou Harris | Female Vocalist of the Year | Nominated | |
| 1979 | Emmylou Harris | Female Vocalist of the Year | Nominated | |
| 1980 | Roses in the Snow | Album of the Year | Nominated | |
| 1980 | Emmylou Harris | Female Vocalist of the Year | Won | |
| 1981 | Emmylou Harris | Female Vocalist of the Year | Nominated | |
| 1982 | Emmylou Harris | Female Vocalist of the Year | Nominated | |
| 1983 | Emmylou Harris | Female Vocalist of the Year | Nominated | |
| 1983 | Emmylou Harris and Don Williams | Vocal Duo of the Year | Nominated | |
| 1984 | Emmylou Harris | Female Vocalist of the Year | Nominated | |
| 1984 | Emmylou Harris and Don Williams | Vocal Duo of the Year | Nominated | |
| 1985 | Emmylou Harris | Female Vocalist of the Year | Nominated | |
| 1986 | Emmylou Harris | Female Vocalist of the Year | Nominated | |
| 1987 | Trio (with Dolly Parton and Linda Ronstadt) | Album of the Year | Nominated | |
| 1987 | Emmylou Harris | Female Vocalist of the Year | Nominated | |
| 1988 | Trio (with Dolly Parton and Linda Ronstadt) | Vocal Event of the Year | Won | |
| 1988 | Emmylou Harris and Earl Thomas Conley | Vocal Event of the Year | Nominated | |
| 1990 | Emmylou Harris and Willie Nelson | Vocal Event of the Year | Nominated | |
| 1999 | "Same Old Train" (with various artists) | Vocal Event of the Year | Nominated | |
| 2001 | O Brother, Where Art Thou? (with various artists) | Album of the Year | Won | |
| 2001 | "Didn't Leave Nobody But the Baby" (with Alison Krauss and Gillian Welch) | Vocal Event of the Year | Nominated | |

== Country Music Hall of Fame and Museum ==
| Year | Nominee / work | Award | Result | Ref. |
|---|---|---|---|---|
| 2008 | Emmylou Harris | Country Music Hall of Fame and Museum | Inducted | |

== Grammy Awards ==
| Year | Nominee / work | Award | Result | Ref. |
|---|---|---|---|---|
| 1976 | "If I Could Only Win Your Love" | Best Female Country Vocal Performance | Nominated | |
| 1977 | Elite Hotel | Best Female Country Vocal Performance | Won | |
| 1977 | "Here, There and Everywhere" | Best Female Pop Vocal Performance | Nominated | |
| 1978 | "Making Believe" | Best Female Country Vocal Performance | Nominated | |
| 1979 | Quarter Moon in a Ten Cent Town | Best Female Country Vocal Performance | Nominated | |
| 1980 | Blue Kentucky Girl | Best Female Country Vocal Performance | Won | |
| 1981 | "That Lovin' You Feeling Again" (with Roy Orbison) | Best Country Performance by a Duo or Group with Vocal | Won | |
| 1981 | Roses in the Snow | Best Female Country Vocal Performance | Nominated | |
| 1982 | "If I Needed You" (with Don Williams) | Best Country Performance by a Duo or Group with Vocal | Nominated | |
| 1983 | Cimarron | Best Female Country Vocal Performance | Nominated | |
| 1983 | "Love Hurts" (with Gram Parsons) | Best Country Performance by a Duo or Group with Vocal | Nominated | |
| 1984 | Last Date | Best Female Country Vocal Performance | Nominated | |
| 1985 | "In My Dreams" | Best Female Country Vocal Performance | Won | |
| 1986 | The Ballad of Sally Rose | Best Female Country Vocal Performance | Nominated | |
| 1987 | "Today I Started Loving You Again" | Best Female Country Vocal Performance | Nominated | |
| 1988 | Trio (with Dolly Parton and Linda Ronstadt) | Album of the Year | Nominated | |
| 1988 | Trio (with Dolly Parton and Linda Ronstadt) | Best Country Performance by a Duo or Group with Vocal | Won | |
| 1988 | "You Are" (with Glen Campbell) | Best Country Vocal Performance, Duet | Nominated | |
| 1988 | Angel Band | Best Female Country Vocal Performance | Nominated | |
| 1989 | "Back in Baby's Arms" | Best Female Country Vocal Performance | Nominated | |
| 1989 | "We Believe in Happy Endings" (with Earl Thomas Conley) | Best Country Vocal Collaboration | Nominated | |
| 1990 | "Will the Circle Be Unbroken?" (with various artists) | Best Country Vocal Collaboration | Nominated | |
| 1990 | Bluebird | Best Female Country Vocal Performance | Nominated | |
| 1993 | At the Ryman (with The Nash Ramblers) | Best Country Performance by a Duo or Group with Vocal | Won | |
| 1993 | "Scotland" | Best Country Instrumental Performance | Nominated | |
| 1994 | "High Powered Love" | Best Female Country Vocal Performance | Nominated | |
| 1996 | Wrecking Ball | Best Contemporary Folk Album | Won | |
| 1999 | "Same Old Train" (with various artists) | Best Country Collaboration with Vocals | Won | |
| 1999 | Spyboy | Best Contemporary Folk Album | Nominated | |
| 1999 | "Love Still Remains" | Best Female Country Vocal Performance | Nominated | |
| 2000 | "After the Gold Rush" (with Dolly Parton and Linda Ronstadt) | Best Country Collaboration with Vocals | Won | |
| 2000 | Trio II (with Dolly Parton and Linda Ronstadt) | Best Country Album | Nominated | |
| 2000 | Western Wall: The Tucson Sessions (with Linda Ronstadt) | Best Contemporary Folk Album | Nominated | |
| 2000 | "Ordinary Heart" | Best Female Country Vocal Performance | Nominated | |
| 2001 | Red Dirt Girl | Best Contemporary Folk Album | Won | |
| 2002 | O Brother, Where Art Thou? (with various artists) | Album of the Year | Won | |
| 2002 | "Didn't Leave Nobody But the Baby" | Best Country Collaboration with Vocals | Nominated | |
| 2003 | "Flesh and Blood" (with Mary Chapin Carpenter and Sheryl Crow) | Best Country Collaboration with Vocals | Nominated | |
| 2004 | Stumble into Grace | Best Contemporary Folk Album | Nominated | |
| 2006 | "Shelter from the Storm" (with Rodney Crowell) | Best Country Collaboration with Vocals | Nominated | |
| 2006 | "The Connection" | Best Female Country Vocal Performance | Won | |
| 2007 | All the Roadrunning (with Mark Knopfler) | Best Contemporary Folk/Americana Album | Nominated | |
| 2009 | All I Intended to Be | Best Contemporary Folk/Americana Album | Nominated | |
| 2012 | Hard Bargain | Best Americana Album | Nominated | |
| 2014 | Old Yellow Moon (with Rodney Crowell) | Best Americana Album | Won | |
| 2016 | The Traveling Kind (with Rodney Crowell) | Best Americana Album | Nominated | |
| 2016 | "The Traveling Kind" (with Rodney Crowell) | Best American Roots Song | Nominated | |
| 2018 | Emmylou Harris | Grammy Lifetime Achievement Award | Won | |

== Grand Ole Opry ==
| Year | Nominee / work | Award | Result | Ref. |
|---|---|---|---|---|
| 1992 | Emmylou Harris | Inducted as a Member | Inducted | |

== Hollywood Walk of Fame ==
| Year | Nominee / work | Award | Result | Ref. |
|---|---|---|---|---|
| 2019 | Emmylou Harris, Dolly Parton and Linda Ronstadt | Hollywood Walk of Fame | Inducted | |

== International Bluegrass Music Association Awards ==
| Year | Nominee / work | Award | Result | Ref. |
|---|---|---|---|---|
| 2001 | O Brother, Where Art Thou? (with various artists) | Album of the Year | Won | |
| 2002 | Down from the Mountain (with various artists) | Album of the Year | Won | |
| 2003 | Will the Circle Be Unbroken, Volume III (with various artists) | Collaborative Recording of the Year | Won | |
| 2004 | Livin', Lovin', Losin': Songs of the Louvin Brothers (with various artists) | Collaborative Recording of the Year | Won | |

== Polar Music Prize ==
| Year | Nominee / work | Award | Result | Ref. |
|---|---|---|---|---|
| 2015 | Emmylou Harris | Polar Music Prize | Won | |

== Record World Country Awards ==
| Year | Nominee / work | Award | Result | Ref. |
|---|---|---|---|---|
| 1975 | Emmylou Harris | Top New Female Vocalist – Singles | Nominated | |
| 1979 | Emmylou Harris | Top Female Vocalist – Singles | Nominated | |
| 1980 | Emmylou Harris | Top Female Vocalist – Singles | Nominated | |
| 1981 | Emmylou Harris | Top Female Vocalist – Singles | Nominated | |

== Satellite Awards ==
| Year | Nominee / work | Award | Result | Ref. |
|---|---|---|---|---|
| 2012 | "Fire in the Blood/Snake Song" (with Nick Cave and Warren Ellis) | Best Original Song | Nominated | |
