= Duets (Emmylou Harris album) =

Compilation album by Emmylou Harris
- Released: July 24, 1990
- Genre: Country
- Length: 41:23
- Label: Reprise
- Producer: various producers

Emmylou Harris chronology
Bluebird (1989)	Duets (1990)	Brand New Dance (1990)

Professional ratings
Review scores
Source	Rating
AllMusic	3/5 stars
Select	4/5 medals

Duets is a compilation of duets by the country music artist Emmylou Harris in partnership with other well-known country and rock artists. Most of the twelve tracks on the album originally appeared as singles or on albums released by her singing partners. Several of the tracks attained positions on the Billboard Hot Country Singles charts: "That Lovin' You Feelin' Again" with Roy Orbison was at #6 in 1980; "If I Needed You" with Don Williams at #3 in 1981; "Wild Montana Skies" with John Denver at #14 in 1983; "Thing About You" with Southern Pacific at #14 in 1985; and "We Believe in Happy Endings" with Earl Thomas Conley at #1 in 1988. Also included is "Love Hurts", an early duet with Gram Parsons from his Grievous Angel album. Duets reached #24 on the country albums chart in 1990.

== Track listing ==
No.	Title	Writer(s)	Original release	Length
1.	"The Price I Pay" (with The Desert Rose Band)	Chris Hillman, Bill Wilds	first appearance	2:58
2.	"Love Hurts" (with Gram Parsons)	Boudleaux Bryant	Grievous Angel (1974)	3:40
3.	"That Lovin' You Feelin' Again" (with Roy Orbison)	Roy Orbison, Chris Price	Roadie [Original Soundtrack] (1980)	4:00
4.	"We Believe in Happy Endings" (with Earl Thomas Conley)	Bob McDill	The Heart of It All (1988)	3:34
5.	"Thing About You" (with Southern Pacific)	Tom Petty	Southern Pacific (1985)	3:51
6.	"Star of Bethlehem" (with Neil Young)	Neil Young	American Stars 'n Bars (1977)	2:43
7.	"All Fall Down" (with George Jones)	Ron Peterson, Harlan Howard	Ladies' Choice (1984)	3:19
8.	"Wild Montana Skies" (with John Denver)	John Denver	It's About Time (1983)	4:02
9.	"Green Pastures" (with Ricky Skaggs)	Van Hoose	Roses in the Snow (1980)	3:08
10.	"Gulf Coast Highway" (with Willie Nelson)	Nanci Griffith, Danny Flowers, James Hooker	first appearance	3:09
11.	"If I Needed You" (with Don Williams)	Townes Van Zandt	Cimarron (1981)	3:35
12.	"Evangeline" (with The Band)	Robbie Robertson	The Last Waltz (1978)	3:10

== Personnel ==
- Brian Ahern – arranger, producer
- The Band – vocals
- Earl Thomas Conley – vocals
- Rick Danko – electric bass, vocals
- John Denver – vocals, producer
- Desert Rose Band – vocals
- Rob Fraboni – producer
- Garth Fundis – producer
- Emory Gordy – producer
- Caroline Greyshock – photography
- Emmylou Harris – acoustic guitar, guitar, vocals
- Bradley Hartman – producer, mastering, assembly
- George Jones – vocals
- Janet Levinson – art direction, design
- Elliot Mazer – producer
- Glenn Meadows – mastering assistant
- Willie Nelson – vocals
- Jim Ed Norman – producer
- Milton Okun – executive producer
- Roy Orbison – vocals
- Gram Parsons – vocals, producer
- Dolly Parton – harmony vocals
- Robbie Robertson – producer
- Larry Samuels – executive producer
- Randy Scruggs – producer
- Ed Seay – producer
- Billy Sherrill – producer
- John Simon – producer
- Ricky Skaggs – vocals
- Southern Pacific – vocals, producer
- Don Williams – vocals, producer
- Paul Worley – producer
- Barney Wyckoff – producer
- Neil Young – vocals

== Chart performance ==
Chart (1990)	Peak position
U.S. Billboard Top Country Albums	24

== Release history ==
Release history and formats for Duets
Region	Date	Format	Label	Ref.
North America	July 24, 1990	LP; CD; cassette	Warner Bros. Records	
