= Frank Reckard =

American guitarist (born 1952)

- Born: Francis Laing Reckard; July 1, 1952 (age 73); Fulton, Missouri, U.S.
- Occupations: Musician, lawyer
- Instrument: Guitar
- Years active: 1974–1989 (as studio musician)

Francis Laing "Frank" Reckard (born July 1, 1952) is an American guitarist. He was part of Emmylou Harris's Hot Band from 1978 to 1989, and supported many other musical acts as a studio musician. After the Hot Band disbanded in the 1990s, he had a career as an attorney specializing in water law. He has been hailed as one of the "unsung greats" who played a "crackling" lead guitar.

== Biography ==
=== Early life ===
Reckard was born to Edgar and Susanna Reckard. He grew up in Claremont, California where his father served as a chaplain and a professor of the Claremont Colleges. He began playing guitar professionally during high school; Reckard got his early nickname "Fast Farm" from his fast-picking style and the name of this band. He graduated from Claremont High School in 1970, and attended college at UC Santa Cruz, but left to pursue a music career.

=== Music career ===
Reckard settled in the Los Angeles area and began working as a sideman. He was mentored by two other musicians from Claremont, John Ware and Chris Darrow, and played lead guitar for their group, The Darrow Mosely Band, on their three-track 10" demo EP titled Desert Rain in 1973. At various times from 1972 to 1976 he toured with Hoyt Axton. In 1978, he joined Emmylou Harris's Hot Band, replacing Albert Lee on guitars. He also toured at various times with Rodney Crowell and the Cherry Bombs and Larry Hosford(Shelter Records). Along the way Reckard worked as a studio musician with a number of musical artists. At least during the period of the Hot Band, Reckard played a Gibson Les Paul Junior with a custom B-Bender.

=== Law career ===
In 1990, after Harris disbanded the Hot Band, Reckard returned to college, graduating from UC Santa Barbara in 1992. He then attended the UCLA School of Law, graduating as a J.D. in 1995. Reckard moved back to New Mexico where he had lived in the early 1980s to work as a lawyer in private practice. He eventually became a Special Assistant Attorney General for the state of New Mexico, focusing in water law. For more than ten years he was the lead attorney for the state in State of New Mexico ex rel. Office of the State Engineer vs. Elephant Butte Irrigation District, the largest ongoing water rights adjudication in the State of New Mexico. Tensions over these complex water issues led to a U.S. Supreme Court case where the State of Texas sued Colorado and New Mexico over their interstate water compact.

Reckard retired from this position in 2015 but continues to be involved part-time. He also returned to playing guitar professionally, last playing lead guitar for Tracy Parker in March 2018.

== Personal life ==
Reckard lives in Santa Fe, New Mexico, with his wife, Joan Berde.

== Discography ==
Reckard was a guitarist on multiple albums and tracks.

=== Albums with Emmylou Harris ===
- Quarter Moon in a Ten Cent Town (Warner Bros., 1978)
- Blue Kentucky Girl (Warner Bros., 1979)
- Light of the Stable (Warner Bros., 1979)
- Roses in the Snow (Warner Bros., 1980)
- Evangeline (Warner Bros., 1981)
- Cimarron (Warner Bros., 1981)
- Last Date (Warner Bros., 1982)
- White Shoes (Warner Bros., 1983)
- Thirteen (Warner Bros. 1986)

=== Other recordings ===
- Under My Own Disguise by Chris Darrow (United Artists, 1974)
- Southbound by Hoyt Axton (A&M, 1975)
- Lorenzo by Larry Hosford (Shelter, 1975)
- Fearless by Hoyt Axton (A&M, 1976)
- Cross Words by Larry Hosford (Shelter, 1976)
- Reckless Love and Bold Adventure by Rose Maddox (Takoma, 1977)
- Ear Candy by Helen Reddy (Capitol, 1977) as Francis Reckard
- Right or Wrong by Rosanne Cash (Columbia, 1979)
- But What Will the Neighbors Think by Rodney Crowell (Warner Bros., 1980)
- Seven Year Ache by Rosanne Cash (Columbia, 1981)
- The South Coast of Texas by Guy Clark (Warner Bros., 1981)
- Craftsman by Guy Clark (Rounder/Philo, 1985)

Reckard has also recorded with Buck Owens, Tom Adler, Tonya Rae, Silver Shoes, and Don Michael Simpson.
