= Emmylou Harris discography =

Emmylou Harris discography may refer to:

- Emmylou Harris albums discography
- Emmylou Harris singles discography
