= Light of the Stable =

Studio album by Emmylou Harris
- Released: November 1979
- Genres: Country, Christmas
- Length: 30.20 (LP): 41:32 (2004 CD)
- Label: Warner Bros. Nashville / Rhino
- Producer: Brian Ahern

Emmylou Harris chronology
| Blue Kentucky Girl (1979) | Light of the Stable (1979) | Roses in the Snow (1980) |

1992 alternative Cover
- 1992 album cover

2004 alternative cover
- 2004 album cover

Professional ratings
Review scores
| Source | Rating |
|---|---|
| AllMusic | 4/5 stars |
| The Austin Chronicle | 4/5 stars |

Light of the Stable is the first Christmas album by Emmylou Harris. It was originally released in 1979 by Warner Bros. Records but has since gone through several intervening releases. The 1992 Warner release was a remastered version of the original with a different album cover. The latest edition was released in 2004 by Rhino Records. It contains three newly recorded tracks in addition to remastered versions of the ten original tracks. Its cover came from the record sleeve of the original 45-rpm single version of "Light of the Stable" that was released in 1975. The title song featured harmony vocals from Neil Young, Dolly Parton and Linda Ronstadt.

== Critical reception ==
Mark Deming of AllMusic gives the album 4 out of a possible 5 stars and writes, "Emmylou Harris is an artist with the rare sort of voice that communicates an honest and firmly grounded humanity while possessing a crystalline purity that verges on the angelic. In short, she was a singer born to make a great Christmas album, and in 1979 she did just that with Light of the Stable".

Gavin Edwards lists this album at No, 19 in Rolling Stone's 40 Essential Christmas Albums list. He writes, "Harris has always sung like an angel, and on this 1979 album she played the part, a living herald of joyful Nativity tidings. Some of the other golden-throated seraphim providing backing vocals: Linda Ronstadt, Dolly Parton, and, er, Neil Young."

Jim Caligiuri of The Austin Chronicle gives this album 4 stars and says, "Emmylou Harris possesses the voice of an angel, so it only makes sense that her versions of Christmas classics are unequaled, as are special guests Willie Nelson, Neil Young, and Dolly Parton."

== Track listing ==
=== Original release ===
Side one
| No. | Title | Writer(s) | Length |
|---|---|---|---|
| 1. | "Christmas Time's A-Coming" | Tex Logan | 2:51 |
| 2. | "O Little Town of Bethlehem" | Phillips Brooks, Lewis H. Redner | 3:40 |
| 3. | "Away in a Manger" (with Nancy Ahern) | Martin Luther; arr. Jonathan E. Spillman | 2:37 |
| 4. | "Angel Eyes (Angel Eyes)" | Rodney Crowell | 3:18 |
| 5. | "The First Noel" | Traditional | 2:40 |

Side two
| No. | Title | Writer(s) | Length |
|---|---|---|---|
| 1. | "Beautiful Star of Bethlehem" | Arthur L. Phipps | 3:05 |
| 2. | "The Little Drummer Boy" | Katherine K. Davis, Henry Onorati, Harry Simeone | 4:02 |
| 3. | "Golden Cradle" (with Nancy Ahern) | Traditional; arr. Nancy Ahern | 2:05 |
| 4. | "Silent Night" | Josef Mohr, Franz Gruber; arr. Brian Ahern | 3:33 |
| 5. | "Light of the Stable" | Steven Rhymer, Elizabeth Rhymer | 2:29 |

=== 2004 expanded version ===
| No. | Title | Writer(s) | Length |
|---|---|---|---|
| 1. | "Christmas Time's A-Coming" | Tex Logan | 2:51 |
| 2. | "O Little Town of Bethlehem" | Phillips Brooks. Lewis H. Redner | 3:40 |
| 3. | "Away in a Manger" (with Nancy Ahern) | Martin Luther; arr. Jonathan E. Spillman | 2:37 |
| 4. | "Angel Eyes (Angel Eyes)" | Rodney Crowell | 3:18 |
| 5. | "The First Noel" | Traditional | 2:40 |
| 6. | "Beautiful Star of Bethlehem" | Arthur L. Phipps | 3:05 |
| 7. | "Little Drummer Boy" | Katherine K. Davis, Henry Onorati, Harry Simeone | 4:02 |
| 8. | "There's a Light" (new track) | Beth Nielsen Chapman | 2:54 |
| 9. | "Cherry Tree Carol" (new track) | Traditional/arr. Kate McGarrigle/Anna McGarrigle | 3:33 |
| 10. | "Golden Cradle" (with Nancy Ahern) | Traditional/arr. Nancy Ahern | 2:05 |
| 11. | "Silent Night" | Josef Mohr, Franz Gruber; arr. Brian Ahern | 3:33 |
| 12. | "Man Is an Island" (new track) | Kate McGarrigle, Anna McGarrigle, Jane McGarrigle | 4:45 |
| 13. | "Light of the Stable" | Steven Rhymer, Elizabeth Rhymer | 2:29 |

== Personnel ==
- Brian Ahern – acoustic guitar, percussion, 6-string bass
- Nancy Ahern – backing vocals
- Mike Bowden – bass
- Brian Bowers – autoharp
- Tony Brown – clavinet
- James Burton – electric guitar
- Rodney Crowell – acoustic guitar
- Hank DeVito – pedal steel guitar
- Emory Gordy Jr. – bass
- Glen Hardin – piano
- Sharon Hicks – backing vocals
- Albert Lee – mandolin
- Willie Nelson – backing vocals
- Dolly Parton – backing vocals
- Frank Reckard – electric guitar
- Linda Ronstadt – backing vocals
- Ricky Skaggs – banjo, mandolin, violin, acoustic guitar
- John Ware – drums
- Cheryl Warren – backing vocals
- Neil Young – backing vocals
- Emmylou Harris – vocals, acoustic guitar

== Charts ==
Album – Billboard
| Year | Chart | Position |
|---|---|---|
| 1980 | Billboard 200 | 102 |
| 1981 | Top Country Albums | 22 |

== Release history ==
Release history and formats for Light of the Stable
| Region | Date | Format | Label | Ref. |
|---|---|---|---|---|
| North America | November 1979 | LP; cassette | Warner Bros. Records | |
