= Spyboy (album) =

1998 live album by Emmylou Harris

Live album by Emmylou Harris
- Released: August 11, 1998
- Genre: Country
- Length: 61:55
- Label: Eminent
- Producers: Buddy Miller, Emmylou Harris

Emmylou Harris chronology
Wrecking Ball (1995)	Spyboy (1998)	Trio II (1999)

Professional ratings
Review scores
Source	Rating
AllMusic	4/5 stars
Entertainment Weekly	A−
Robert Christgau	(dud)

Spyboy is a 1998 live album by Emmylou Harris and her backing band, Spyboy. The band was formed for a tour performing songs from her career-redefining 1995 album Wrecking Ball.

Taking a stripped-down approach, Harris is backed by a trio comprising country singer-songwriter Buddy Miller on guitar and New Orleans musicians Daryl Johnson on bass and Brady Blade on drums. Along with material from Wrecking Ball, such as "Where Will I Be" and "Deeper Well", the album includes songs from earlier in her career, such as "Born to Run" from Cimarron, "I Ain't Living Long Like This" from Quarter Moon in a Ten Cent Town, "Love Hurts", which she first performed with Gram Parsons, and "Boulder to Birmingham," her ode to Parsons from Pieces of the Sky.

== Track listing ==
No.	Title	Writer(s)	Length
1.	"My Songbird"	Jesse Winchester	3:30
2.	"Where Will I Be"	Daniel Lanois	4:21
3.	"I Ain't Living Long Like This"	Rodney Crowell	4:20
4.	"Love Hurts"	Boudleaux Bryant	2:55
5.	"Green Pastures"	Traditional	3:05
6.	"Deeper Well"	Emmylou Harris, Daniel Lanois, David Olney	7:16
7.	"Prayer in Open D"	Emmylou Harris	4:01
8.	"Calling My Children Home"	Doyle Lawson, Charles Waller, Robert Yates	3:02
9.	"Tulsa Queen"	Rodney Crowell, Emmylou Harris	4:30
10.	"Wheels"	Chris Hillman, Gram Parsons	3:04
11.	"Born to Run"	Paul Kennerley	4:44
12.	"Boulder to Birmingham"	Bill Danoff, Emmylou Harris	3:21
13.	"All My Tears (Be Washed Away)"	Julie Miller	5:06
14.	"The Maker"	Daniel Lanois	8:40
Total length:			61:55

2025 rerelease bonus tracks
No.	Title	Writer(s)	Length
15.	"Thing About You"	Tom Petty	4:25
16.	"All I Left Behind"	Anna McGarrigle, Emmylou Harris, Kate McGarrigle	3:25
17.	"Every Grain of Sand"	Bob Dylan	3:58
18.	"Get Up John"	Bill Monroe	3:32
19.	"Sweet Old World"	Lucinda Williams	4:02
Total length:			81:17

== Personnel ==
=== Spyboy ===
- Emmylou Harris - lead vocals, acoustic guitar
- Buddy Miller - electric guitar, backing vocals
- Daryl Johnson - electric bass, bass pedals, djembe, percussion, backing vocals
- Brady Blade - drum kit, percussion, backing vocals

=== Additional personnel ===
- Julie Miller - backing vocals on "All My Tears (Be Washed Away)"

== Chart performance ==
Chart (1998)	Peak position
U.S. Billboard Top Country Albums	27
U.S. Billboard 200	180

== Release history ==
Release history and formats for Spyboy
Region	Date	Format	Label	Ref.
North America	August 11, 1998	CD; cassette	Eminent Records	
North America and Europe	April 12, 2025	Vinyl (Record Store Day exclusive)	New West Records	
North America and Europe	November 7, 2025	CD; vinyl; streaming	New West Records	
