= Tennessee Rose =

Single by Emmylou Harris

from the album Cimarron
- B-side: "Mama Help"
- Released: January 16, 1982
- Genre: Country
- Length: 3:46
- Label: Warner Bros. Nashville
- Songwriter(s): Karen Brooks, Hank DeVito
- Producer(s): Brian Ahern

Emmylou Harris singles chronology
"If I Needed You" (1981)	"Tennessee Rose" (1982)	"Born to Run" (1982)

"Tennessee Rose" is a song written by Karen Brooks and Hank DeVito, and recorded by American country music artist Emmylou Harris. It was released in January 1982 as the first single from the album Cimarron. The song reached number 9 on the Billboard Hot Country Singles & Tracks chart.

== Chart performance ==
Chart (1982)	Peak position
US Hot Country Songs (Billboard)	9
Canadian RPM Country Tracks	5
