= Beneath Still Waters (song) =

Single by Diana Trask
- B-side: "Heartbreak Hotel"
- Released: March 28, 1970
- Genre: Country
- Label: Dot
- Songwriter: Dallas Frazier
- Producer: Buddy Killen

Diana Trask singles chronology
"I Fall to Pieces" (1969)	"Beneath Still Waters" (1970)	"The Chokin' Kind" (1970)

"Beneath Still Waters" is a song written by Dallas Frazier in 1967 and first recorded the same year by George Jones, who released it on his 1968 album My Country. Country singer Carl Vaughn's version was released as the B-side to his single "Love Thy Neighbor" in October 1968 on Monument Records, before the release of Jones' album in December 1968.

In 1970, it was recorded and released as a single by Diana Trask. "Beneath Still Waters" was her second hit on the country chart, spending two weeks and peaking at number 38 on the chart. In March 1980, Emmylou Harris scored her fourth number one hit on the country chart with her version of the song, which was the second single from her album Blue Kentucky Girl.

== Chart performance ==
Chart (1970)	Peak position
US Hot Country Songs (Billboard)	38
Canadian RPM Country Tracks	50

"Beneath Still Waters"

Single by Emmylou Harris

from the album Blue Kentucky Girl
- B-side: "'Til I Gain Control Again"
- Released: March 1, 1980
- Genre: Country
- Length: 3:45
- Label: Warner Bros. Nashville
- Songwriter: Dallas Frazier
- Producer: Brian Ahern

Emmylou Harris singles chronology
"Blue Kentucky Girl" (1979)	"Beneath Still Waters" (1980)	"Wayfaring Stranger" (1980)
