= Phipps Family =

The Phipps Family was an American country music group that consisted mainly of Arthur Leroy Phipps (August 12, 1916 in Knox County, Kentucky – August 30, 1995) and Kathleen Norris Helton (April 22, 1924 – November 4, 1992), with the addition of various children. They became known as interpreters of the Carter Family style, and they did it so well that they were labeled "Carter clones".

== Career ==
The family's musical career began shortly after the marriage of Arthur and Kathleen, when they jointly decided to perform as a group. Together with Arthur's niece, Hester Anderson, they formed a trio. By 1943, they performed regularly, and soon Hester was replaced by various Phipps children in different constellations.

In 1950, they were offered a spot at radio station WCTT in Corbin, Kentucky, followed by other jobs at WYWY in Barbourville, Kentucky, and on the Mid-Day Merry-Go-Round at WNOX in Knoxville, Tennessee. They also made some appearances on the WWVA Jamboree. In the beginning, they had their own original style singing secular songs, but since they received so many requests for Carter Family songs, they adopted the Carter Family style. Their first recordings were made for Acme Records.

In 1960, they recorded for Starday Records. During the 1960s, the family was part of the folk revival, and they performed at the Newport Folk Festival in 1964. Shortly after recording an album for Folkways Records, Arthur formed his own label, "Pine Mountain Records", later renamed "Mountain Eagle Records". Between 1962 and 1972, the Phipps Family performed on radio stations such as WCKY in Cincinnati, Ohio, and XEG in Monterrey, Mexico. Their extensive tours over the years took them to thirty-two US states.

== Demise ==
The Phipps Family disbanded in 1991 when Kathleen was diagnosed with cancer. Her health deteriorated, and she went into a coma in April 1992. She died on November 4, 1992. Arthur Phipps died on August 30, 1995, when he was brutally stabbed to death in his own home by an assailant during a robbery. He was found outside his house by a son-in-law. Phipps assassin John Mills was apprehended and later convicted of murder, first-degree burglary and first-degree robbery. He was sentenced to death.
