= Last Date (Emmylou Harris album) =

Live album by Emmylou Harris
- Released: October 1982
- Recorded: Mid 1982
- Venue: several dates in California
- Genre: Country
- Label: Warner Bros. Nashville
- Producer: Brian Ahern

Emmylou Harris chronology
Cimarron (1981)	Last Date (1982)	White Shoes (1983)

Emmylou Harris live chronology
Last Date (1982)	At the Ryman (1992)

Professional ratings
Review scores
Source	Rating
AllMusic	2.5/5 stars
The Austin Chronicle	4.5/5 stars

Last Date is a live Emmylou Harris album, released in October 1982. Recorded at a series of honky tonks and other small venues on the west coast, Harris conceived the album as a showcase for her Hot Band. It was composed mostly of country standards. Harris reached No. 1 on the U.S. country charts with the title single, written by Floyd Cramer, who originally took it to the top ten on the U.S. pop and country charts, as an instrumental in 1960. In 2000, Eminent Records reissued Last Date for the first time on CD, complete with new liner notes and two bonus tracks.

== Track listing ==
No.	Title	Writer(s)	Length
1.	"I'm Movin' On"	Hank Snow	3:05
2.	"It's Not Love (But It's Not Bad)"	Glenn Martin, Hank Cochran	2:49
3.	"So Sad (To Watch Good Love Go Bad)"	Don Everly	3:20
4.	"Return of the Grievous Angel"	Thomas S. Brown, Gram Parsons	3:50
5.	"Restless"	Carl Perkins	3:20
6.	"Racing in the Street"	Bruce Springsteen	5:24
7.	"Long May You Run"	Neil Young	3:09
8.	"We'll Sweep Out the Ashes in the Morning"	Joyce Allsup	2:50
9.	"Juanita"	Gram Parsons, Chris Hillman	3:06
10.	"Devil in Disguise"	Gram Parsons, Chris Hillman	3:10
11.	"(Lost His Love) On Our Last Date"	Floyd Cramer, Conway Twitty	3:31
12.	"Buckaroo" / "Love's Gonna Live Here" (medley)	Bob Morris, Buck Owens	4:19
13.	"Another Pot o' Tea" (bonus track added to 2000 CD re-issue)	Paul Grady	3:01
14.	"Maybe Tonight" (bonus track added to 2000 CD re-issue)	Shirley Eikhard	2:53
Total length:			47:47

== Personnel ==
- Emmylou Harris - Vocals, Acoustic Guitar, Lead Guitar (12)
- Mike Bowden - Bass
- Steve Fishell - Pedal Steel, Dobro
- Wayne Goodwin - Rhythm Guitar, Fiddle, Mandolin, Sax
- Don Johnson - Keyboards, Harmony Vocals
- Frank Reckard - Lead Guitar, Harmony Vocals
- Barry Tashian - Rhythm Guitar, Banjo, Duet Vocals
- John Ware - Drums

Technical personnel

- Brian Ahern - Producer
- Donivan Cowart, Stuart Taylor, Alan Vachon - Engineer

== Charts ==
=== Weekly charts ===
Chart (1982–1983)	Peak position
US Billboard 200	65
US Top Country Albums (Billboard)	9

=== Year-end charts ===
Chart (1983)	Position
US Top Country Albums (Billboard)	49

== Release history ==
Release history and formats for Last Date
Region	Date	Format	Label	Ref.
North America	October 1982	LP; cassette	Warner Bros. Records	
