= Born to Run (Emmylou Harris song) =

Single by Emmylou Harris

from the album Cimarron
- B-side: "Colors of Your Heart"
- Released: May 29, 1982
- Genre: Country
- Length: 3:48
- Label: Warner Bros. Nashville
- Songwriter(s): Paul Kennerley
- Producer(s): Brian Ahern

Emmylou Harris singles chronology
"Tennessee Rose" (1982)	"Born to Run" (1982)	"(Lost His Love) On Our Last Date" (1982)

"Born to Run" is a song written by Paul Kennerley, and recorded by American country music artist Emmylou Harris. It was released in May 1982 as the second single from the album Cimarron.

The song takes its melody from "The Death of Me," a song from The Legend of Jesse James, a concept album written by Kennerley. This version was performed by Johnny Cash and Levon Helm.

The song reached number 3 on the Billboard Hot Country Singles & Tracks chart. The song was covered by country Music Artist Lee Ann Womack in 2016 on The Life & Songs Of Emmylou Harris: An All-Star Concert Celebration (Live). It was later covered by Irish actress Jessie Buckley for the 2019 country music drama film Wild Rose.

== Charts ==
=== Weekly charts ===
Chart (1982)	Peak position
US Hot Country Songs (Billboard)	3
Canadian RPM Country Tracks	10

=== Year-end charts ===
Chart (1982)	Position
US Hot Country Songs (Billboard)	47
