= Wrecking Ball (Emmylou Harris album) =

Studio album by Emmylou Harris
- Released: September 26, 1995
- Recorded: 1995
- Studios: Kingsway (New Orleans); Woodland (Nashville); Natoma (San Francisco)
- Genres: Alternative country; Americana; country rock; dream pop
- Length: 53:05
- Labels: Asylum; Elektra
- Producer: Daniel Lanois

Emmylou Harris chronology
Cowgirl's Prayer (1993)	Wrecking Ball (1995)	Spyboy (1998)

Singles from Wrecking Ball
- 1. "Where Will I Be" Released: September 11, 1995; 2. "Wrecking Ball" Released: January 1996; 3. "Goodbye" Released: 1996 (radio promo only)

Professional ratings
Review scores
Source	Rating
AllMusic	4.5/5 stars
Chicago Tribune	3.5/4 stars
Christgau's Consumer Guide	B
Entertainment Weekly	A−
The Guardian	4/5 stars
The Irish Times	5/5 stars
Los Angeles Times	3/4 stars
Pitchfork	8.8/10
Rolling Stone	4/5 stars
Uncut	9/10

Wrecking Ball is the eighteenth studio album by American country artist Emmylou Harris, released on September 26, 1995, through Elektra Records. Moving away from her traditional acoustic sound, Harris collaborated with producer Daniel Lanois and engineer Mark Howard. The album has been noted for its atmospheric feel, and featured guest performances by Steve Earle, Larry Mullen Jr., Kate & Anna McGarrigle, Lucinda Williams and Neil Young, who wrote the title song.

== Background ==
Though her choice of songs had always been eclectic, the album was regarded as a departure. Harris, at the age of 48, had become something of an elder stateswoman in country music. The album received nearly universal acclaim, making many critics' year-end "best of" lists, and pointed Harris' career in a somewhat different direction where she would incorporate a harder edge. As a career-redefining album, Wrecking Ball was compared to Marianne Faithfull's 1979 Broken English album and Johnny Cash's American Recordings. Wrecking Ball won the 1996 Grammy Award for Best Contemporary Folk Recording.

== Content ==
Harris covered Neil Young's song "Wrecking Ball", and the track includes harmonies by Young. Although the song was released by Harris as a 2-track CD single with Lucinda Williams' "Sweet Old World", one reviewer did not consider the title track the high point on the album.

== Track listing ==
No.	Title	Writer(s)	Length
1.	"Where Will I Be" (with Daniel Lanois)	Daniel Lanois	4:15
2.	"Goodbye"	Steve Earle	4:53
3.	"All My Tears"	Julie Miller	3:42
4.	"Wrecking Ball"	Neil Young	4:49
5.	"Goin' Back to Harlan"	Anna McGarrigle	4:51
6.	"Deeper Well"	David Olney, Daniel Lanois, Emmylou Harris	4:19
7.	"Every Grain of Sand"	Bob Dylan	3:56
8.	"Sweet Old World"	Lucinda Williams	5:06
9.	"May This Be Love" (with Daniel Lanois)	Jimi Hendrix	4:45
10.	"Orphan Girl"	Gillian Welch	3:15
11.	"Blackhawk"	Daniel Lanois	4:28
12.	"Waltz Across Texas Tonight"	Rodney Crowell, Emmylou Harris	4:46
Total length:			53:05

== Personnel ==
- Emmylou Harris – vocals, acoustic guitar on 3 5 7 10 11 12, harmony vocals on 10
- Daniel Lanois – mandolin on 1 2 3 5 8 10 11 12, electric guitar on 1 2 3 4 6 8 9 11 12, acoustic guitar on 2 7 11, bass on 1 3, dulcimer on 10, duet vocals on 1 9, chant vocals on 3, percussion on 4, bass pedals on 8
- Malcolm Burn – piano on 2 4 8 11 12, tambourine on 4 10 11, vibes on 4, organ on 5 7, synthesizer on 5, keyboards on 6, slide guitar on 8 12, bass on 11, drums on 11, harmony vocals on 11
- Larry Mullen Jr. – drums on 2 3 4 6 7 8 9 12, cymbal on 4, hand drum on 10
- Tony Hall – percussion, bass on 2 4 6 7 12, stick drum on 10
- Daryl Johnson – high harmony vocals on 1, tom tom on 1, drum kit bass pedals on 5, backing vocals on 5, harmonic bass on 6, harmony vocals on 10

=== Additional personnel ===
- Brian Blade – drums on 1, Indian hand drum on 5
- Steve Earle – acoustic guitar on 2 7 8
- Sam O'Sullivan – roto wheel on 4
- Neil Young – harmony vocals on 4 8, harmonica on 8
- Kufaru Mouton – extra percussion on 5
- Lucinda Williams – acoustic guitar on 8
- Richard Bennett – tremolo guitar on 8
- Anna McGarrigle – harmony vocals on 12
- Kate McGarrigle – harmony vocals on 12
- Trina Shoemaker - engineering and mastering

== Charts ==
Chart performance for Wrecking Ball
Chart (1995)	Peak position
Belgian Albums (Ultratop Flanders)	58
Dutch Albums (Album Top 100)	29
Norwegian Albums (VG-lista)	30
Swedish Albums (Sverigetopplistan)	27
UK Albums (Official Charts)	46
UK Country Albums (Official Charts)	1
US Billboard 200	94
Scottish Albums (Official Charts)	61

== Release history ==
Release history and formats for Wrecking Ball
Region	Date	Format	Label	Ref.
North America	September 26, 1995	CD; cassette	Asylum Records; Elektra Records	
