= Roses in the Snow =

Studio album by Emmylou Harris
- Released: April 30, 1980
- Recorded: Nashville, July 1979
- Genres: Bluegrass, country, Americana
- Length: 29:56
- Label: Warner Bros. Nashville
- Producer: Brian Ahern

Emmylou Harris chronology
Light of the Stable (1979)	Roses in the Snow (1980)	Evangeline (1981)

Professional ratings
Review scores
Source	Rating
AllMusic	4.5/5 stars
Christgau's Record Guide	A

Roses in the Snow is the seventh studio album by country music artist Emmylou Harris, released in 1980. While Harris' previous release, 1979's Blue Kentucky Girl, featured traditional, straight-ahead country (as opposed to the country-rock of her prior efforts), Roses in the Snow found Harris performing bluegrass-inspired music, with material by Flatt and Scruggs, Paul Simon, the Carter Family, and Johnny Cash. Cash, Dolly Parton, Linda Ronstadt, the Whites, Ricky Skaggs, Willie Nelson and Tony Rice made guest appearances. "Wayfaring Stranger" was released as the first single in 1980 and went to No. 7 on the Billboard Country charts. The second single, a remake of a Simon & Garfunkel song, "The Boxer", reached No. 13. Backing musicians included Albert Lee and Jerry Douglas.

At the 23rd Annual Grammy Awards, the album was nominated for Best Female Country Vocal Performance but the award went to Anne Murray for "Could I Have This Dance".

== Track listing ==
No.	Title	Writer(s)	Length
1.	"Roses in the Snow"	Ruth Franks	2:32
2.	"Wayfaring Stranger"	Traditional; arr. Brian Ahern	3:26
3.	"Green Pastures"	Traditional; arr. Brian Ahern	3:08
4.	"The Boxer"	Paul Simon	3:16
5.	"Darkest Hour Is Just Before Dawn"	Ralph Stanley	3:22
6.	"I'll Go Stepping Too"	Tom James, Jerry Organ	2:16
7.	"You're Learning"	Ira Louvin, Charlie Louvin	2:57
8.	"Jordan"	Traditional; arr. Brian Ahern	2:07
9.	"Miss the Mississippi and You"	Bill Halley	3:40
10.	"Gold Watch and Chain"	A.P. Carter	3:12
11.	"You're Gonna Change" (bonus track on 2002 CD reissue)	Hank Williams	2:40
12.	"Root Like a Rose" (bonus track on 2002 CD reissue)	Nancy Ahern	4:45

== Personnel ==
- Brian Ahern – 12-string guitar, Adamas guitar, Archtop guitar, gut-string guitar, bass, percussion
- Bryan Bowers – autoharp
- Johnny Cash – backing vocals
- Hank DeVito – pedal steel guitar
- Jerry Douglas – dobro
- Steve Fishell – pedal steel guitar
- Emory Gordy Jr. – bass
- Emmylou Harris – vocals, acoustic guitar
- Albert Lee – electric guitar, Mandolin
- Willie Nelson – gut-string guitar
- Dolly Parton – backing vocals
- Tony Rice – acoustic guitar, backing vocals
- Linda Ronstadt – duet vocals, backing vocals
- Ricky Skaggs – acoustic guitar, banjo, fiddle, mandolin, duet vocals, backing vocals
- John Ware – percussion
- Buck White – piano, backing vocals
- Cheryl White – backing vocals
- Sharon White – backing vocals

Technical

- Brian Ahern – producer, engineer
- Donivan Cowart – engineer
- Stuart Taylor – engineer

== Charts ==
Chart (1980)	Peak position
U.S. Billboard Top Country Albums	2
U.S. Billboard 200	26
Canadian RPM Country Albums	2

== Release history ==
Release history and formats for Roses in the Snow
Region	Date	Format	Label	Ref.
North America	April 30, 1980	LP; cassette	Warner Bros. Records	
