= If I Needed You =

1972 song by Townes Van Zandt

Single by Emmylou Harris and Don Williams

from the album Cimarron
- B-side: "Ashes by Now"
- Released: September 1981
- Genre: Country
- Length: 3:37
- Label: Warner Bros. Nashville
- Songwriter: Townes Van Zandt
- Producers: Garth Fundis, Don Williams, Brian Ahern

Emmylou Harris singles chronology
"I Don't Have to Crawl" (1981)	"If I Needed You" (1981)	"Tennessee Rose" (1981)

Don Williams singles chronology
"Miracles" (1981)	"If I Needed You" (1981)	"Lord, I Hope This Day Is Good" (1981)

"If I Needed You" is a song written by Townes Van Zandt and performed on his 1972 album The Late Great Townes Van Zandt. It was covered 9 years later by American country music artists Emmylou Harris and Don Williams as a duet, and was released in September 1981 as the first single from Harris' album Cimarron. The song reached #3 on the Billboard Hot Country Singles chart and #1 on the RPM Country Tracks chart in Canada. According to Townes's business partner and producer Kevin Eggers, the song was written about his wife Anne Mittendorf Eggers.

The song is very similar musically to David Allan Coe's later song "Would You Lay with Me (In a Field of Stone)." Van Zandt's former manager John Lomax III recounts that when Coe heard Van Zandt play the song, he asked Van Zandt if he could "do something with it." However, Van Zandt is not credited on the later song.

== Charts ==
Chart (1981)	Peak position
US Hot Country Songs (Billboard)	3
Canadian RPM Country Tracks	1

== Covers ==
Townes Van Zandt's "If I Needed You" was not only covered by Emmylou Harris and Don Williams, but also by Andrew Bird on Hands of Glory, Guy Clark on Songs and Stories, Lyle Lovett on Step Inside This House, and others. The song was also recorded by Doc Watson for his record Then and Now. On his record Live at the Old Quarter, Townes introduces the song "If I Needed You" by saying, "This was recorded by Doc Watson, and it really blew my mind, you know…" The song is also covered in the Belgian film The Broken Circle Breakdown, where the Broken Circle Breakdown Bluegrass Band, including actors Johan Heldenbergh and Veerle Baetens sing it live. It also appears on the original soundtrack of the film. In 1997, Dead Ringer Band covered the song on their album, Living in the Circle, and in 2000 Seán Keane covered it on his album The Man That I Am. In 2012, Mumford & Sons released a version of the song. Kasey Chambers covered the song on her 2011 album Storybook. In 2018, the Spanish singer-songwriter Javier Álvarez released a version of the song in his tenth album, properly called "10". The song is also covered in the first episode of the TV series Patriot.
