= Emmylou Harris =

American singer, songwriter, and musician (born 1947)

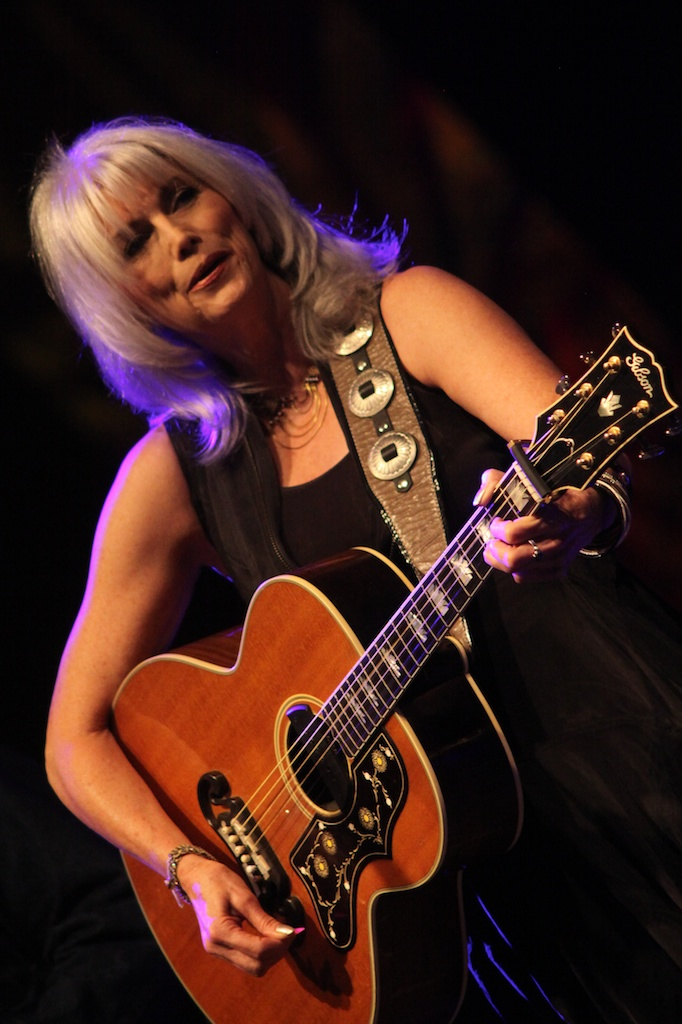
- Harris performing in 2011
- Born: April 2, 1947 (age 79); Birmingham, Alabama, U.S.
- Occupations: Singer; songwriter; musician; activist
- Years active: 1969–present
- Spouses: Tom Slocum (m. 1969; div. 1971); Brian Ahern (m. 1977; div. 1984); Paul Kennerley (m. 1985; div. 1993)
- Children: 2
- Awards: Awards and nominations
- Musical career
- Origin: Washington, D.C.
- Genres: Americana; country; country rock; folk; outlaw country; progressive country
- Instruments: Vocals; guitar
- Labels: Jubilee; Reprise–Warner Bros.; Asylum–Elektra; Eminent; Mercury; Nonesuch
- Website: emmylouharris.com

Signature
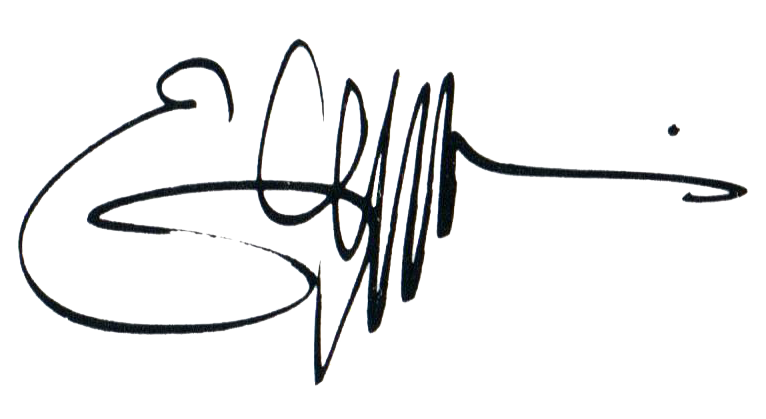

Emmylou Harris (born April 2, 1947) is an American singer, songwriter, musician, bandleader, and activist. She is considered one of the leading music artists behind the country rock genre in the 1970s and the Americana genre in the 1990s. Her music united both country and rock audiences in live performance settings. Her characteristic voice, musical style and songwriting have been acclaimed by critics and fellow recording artists.

Harris developed an interest in folk music in her early years, which led to her performing professionally. After moving to New York City in the 1960s, she recorded a folk album and performed regionally. She was discovered by Gram Parsons, who influenced her country rock direction. Following his 1973 death, Harris obtained her own recording contract from Reprise–Warner Bros. Her second album, Pieces of the Sky (1975), found both critical acclaim and commercial success. Follow-up 1970s albums further elevated Harris's career, such as Elite Hotel (1976), Quarter Moon in a Ten Cent Town (1978) and Blue Kentucky Girl (1979). By 1980, she had acquired five number-one songs on the US country charts: "Together Again", "Sweet Dreams", "Two More Bottles of Wine", "Beneath Still Waters" and "(Lost His Love) On Our Last Date".

Harris had a continued string of commercially and critically successful albums like Roses in the Snow (1980), Evangeline (1981) and Last Date (1982). Her backing group, the Hot Band, helped establish a musical foundation for her concerts and albums. Her 1980s albums spawned the top ten singles "Wayfaring Stranger", "Born to Run" and "Last Date". The 1985 album The Ballad of Sally Rose was among Harris's first self-written projects. The album (along with its follow-ups) failed to sustain the commercial momentum of previous albums. Harris then collaborated with Dolly Parton and Linda Ronstadt on Trio (1987). The platinum-selling album was also a critical success that spawned four top ten singles.

In 1992, Warner Bros. released the live album At the Ryman. It garnered critical praise and renewed interest in its live venue, the Ryman Auditorium. Harris was inspired to move in a new musical direction with 1995's Wrecking Ball. She then reunited with Dolly Parton and Linda Ronstadt for Trio II (1999). By the 2000s, Harris had signed with Nonesuch Records and recorded several albums of self-composed material like Red Dirt Girl (2000), All I Intended to Be (2008) and Hard Bargain (2011). She also found collaborative partnerships, such as with Mark Knopfler on the internationally successful All the Roadrunning (2006). She then collaborated with Rodney Crowell on the critically acclaimed Old Yellow Moon (2013) and The Traveling Kind (2015). She also became involved in activism during this time, including starting her own dog rescue called Bonaparte's Retreat.

Harris has been estimated to have sold over 15 million records worldwide. She has also earned 13 Grammy Awards, placed 27 singles into the top ten of the US country chart, and several of her albums have received gold certifications in the US. She was inducted into the Country Music Hall of Fame in 2008 and was ranked among Rolling Stone's list of the 200 Greatest Singers of All Time in 2022. She was inducted into the Nashville Songwriters Hall of Fame in 2025.

== Early life ==
Harris was born in Birmingham, Alabama, in 1947. She was one of two children born to Walter Rutland Harris and Eugenia Harris. Her older brother, Walter Harris Jr., enjoyed country music in his youth. Her father was a Marine Corps officer who served in both World War II and the Korean War. In the latter, he was taken as a prisoner of war and was reported as missing in action. He was later released. "I never talked to him about his experiences. He wouldn't ever talk about it," she later reflected. The Harris family lived in Birmingham through their daughter's first grade school year. Her father was then transferred to Cherry Point, North Carolina, and later to Quantico, Virginia.

Harris took piano lessons as a child but she did not enjoy them. During her high school years, the family settled near Quantico in Woodbridge, Virginia. Harris was a straight-A high school student at Gar-Field Senior High School, a cheerleader and a saxophonist in the marching band. She also won the "Miss Woodbridge" beauty pageant during her teen years. Classmates considered Harris unusual because she was devoted to her studies. Harris was among many adolescents interested in the American folk music revival of the 1960s. She became fascinated with folk artists of the era such as Joan Baez, Bob Dylan and Buffy Sainte-Marie. Her grandfather gave Harris her first guitar, which she learned to play.

In 1965, Harris graduated from Gar-Field (which was desegregated shortly before she left) as the class valedictorian. She planned to become an actress and accepted a drama scholarship from the University of North Carolina at Greensboro. Harris began taking classes in the fall of 1965. She participated in the school's productions of The Tempest and The Dancing Donkey. Harris then formed a folk music duo with Mike Williams called the Emerald City. The duo worked a series of gigs in the local area, most of which were coffeehouses. Harris also played coffeehouses as a solo performer, primarily in one known as "The Corner".

In 1967, Harris dropped out of the University of North Carolina and enrolled at Boston University, but would soon drop out there as well. She ultimately chose to pursue a career as a folk singer full-time. Harris briefly moved to Virginia Beach, where she worked as a waitress and as a folk singer. She then left for New York City's Greenwich Village neighborhood where there was a popular folk music scene. In 1969, Harris married her first husband Tom Slocum and soon gave birth to her first child.

== Career ==
=== 1969–1974: Folk music and collaborations with Gram Parsons ===
Harris regularly worked the Greenwich Village music scene and developed friendships with fellow artists Jerry Jeff Walker, Dave Bromberg and Paul Siebel. She worked at several notable Greenwich Village clubs, including The Bitter End. She also supported herself by working as a waitress and bookstore cashier. Along with her husband and daughter, Harris lived at a nearby YWCA. Harris got her first manager and signed with Jubilee Records in 1969. The label released her debut studio album, Gliding Bird, in 1970. The disc featured several recordings penned by Harris herself, along with one penned by her first husband, Tom Slocum. Unlike her later recordings, Gliding Bird was released under the name "Emmy Lou Harris".

Jubilee Records declared bankruptcy shortly after Gliding Bird was released. Harris and her husband then decided to attempt a music career in Nashville, Tennessee. The couple divorced while in Nashville. Harris attempted to support herself and her daughter by working as a waitress. However, she was surviving on food stamps and Medicaid. Ultimately, she went back to live with her parents in the Maryland suburb of Clarksville, near Washington, D.C. Harris then obtained a hostessing job in Columbia, Maryland.

At the same time, Harris developed a following performing at clubs in Washington, D.C. and its surrounding suburbs. Yet, she was unconvinced she could make it as a music artist. "At that point, I'd retired forever from the music business," she recalled. Among the clubs Harris worked during this period was Clyde's and The Cellar Door. In 1971, she performed the country song "It Wasn't God Who Made Honky Tonk Angels" one evening at The Cellar Door, "almost as a joke", as she knew little about country music at that time. The Flying Burrito Brothers noticed her performing while they were drinking after a show and thought she had potential. Though singer-songwriter Gram Parsons had left the Byrds and the Flying Burrito Brothers at this time, he was establishing a solo career and mentioned to the Burritos and friends that he was looking for a harmony singer. A conversation about her at a DC nightclub was overheard by the babysitter of Harris's daughter, who passed on her details, and Parsons got in contact the next day. Parsons went to hear Harris and was drawn to her singing ability. One year later, he sent her a plane ticket to Los Angeles, California where she recorded harmony vocals for his debut album GP in September–October 1972. After its release, the album failed to become successful and find a mainstream audience.

Harris also toured as a member of Parsons's band (the Fallen Angels) in 1973, and performed vocal harmonies and duets with him. Through recording and touring, the pair found an instant musical connection. Parsons had become known for his fusion of country rock and had a fascination with classic country music. His passion for the genre was influential on Harris and she soon learned about the country genre. Harris would later credit Parsons for helping her find her artistic direction as well as her passion for authentic country music. In 1973, Harris returned to the recording studio to make Parsons' next album, titled Grievous Angel. Weeks following the album's sessions, Parsons died from a drug and alcohol overdose in a hotel room near Joshua Tree National Park. Parsons's Grievous Angel was released posthumously in 1974, and three more tracks from his sessions with Harris were included on another posthumous Parsons album, Sleepless Nights, in 1976. One more album of recorded material from that period was packaged as Live 1973 but was not released until 1982.

=== 1975–1980: Solo breakthrough ===
Although affected by Gram Parsons' death, Harris continued on as a solo artist. She decided to carry on the country rock legacy left by Parsons for her own career. "Once I started singing country music with Gram there was no turning back for me," she recounted. Harris formed her own band and got a weekly job performing at the Red Fox Inn in Bethesda, Maryland. Meanwhile, Parsons’ former A&R representative at Warner Bros. Records (Mary Martin) attempted to launch Harris's own career. She contacted Canadian-based producer Brian Ahern, who had recent success working alongside Anne Murray. Impressed by her, Ahern agreed to produce Harris. The pair would later marry in 1977 and Harris then signed with Warner Bros.–Reprise.

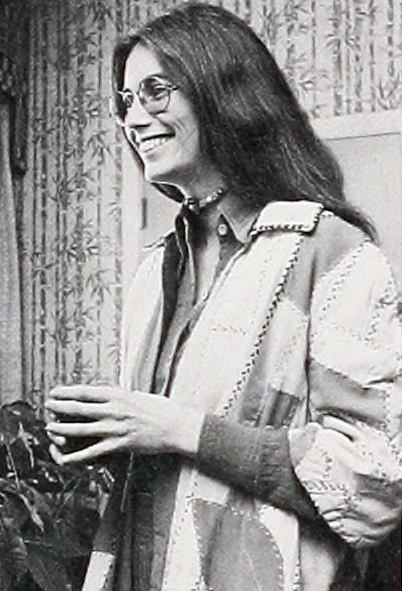
Harris in 1976

Ahern produced Harris's next several albums beginning with 1975's Pieces of the Sky. It featured covers of songs by The Beatles and Merle Haggard, along with originals like Harris' "Boulder to Birmingham", which reflected her emotions surrounding Parsons's death. The disc was a commercial success, reaching number seven on the American Billboard country LP's chart and number 45 on the Billboard 200 all-genre chart. Its second single, "If I Could Only Win Your Love" reached number four on the Billboard country songs chart and topped the Canadian RPM country chart. It was followed by 1975's Elite Hotel. It was her first to top the Billboard country chart while also climbing into Billboard 200 top 25. The disc's covers of Buck Owens's "Together Again" and Don Gibson's "Sweet Dreams" topped the Billboard country chart. Harris formed a new backing group for the project called The Hot Band. The group featured James Burton, Glen D. Hardin (both members of Elvis Presley's TCB Band) and Rodney Crowell.

Harris' albums received critical and commercial success. Adam Sweeting of The Guardian found Pieces of the Sky to have "many brilliant songs". Grant Alden of No Depression concluded that when both LPs are played 'front to back' it makes for "an astonishing, almost blemish-free collection". Elite Hotel also brought Harris the Grammy Award for Best Female Country Vocal Performance. Additionally, both LPs were certified gold in the United States for selling over half a million copies each.

In 1975, Harris contributed backing vocals to several tracks on Bob Dylan's album Desire.

Harris's next several studio collections included both traditional country cover tunes and new material. In 1976, Warner Bros. issued her fourth album, Luxury Liner, which was her second number-one US country album. It also was her second to make the top 20 in the United Kingdom and third to certify gold in the US. Jason Ankeny named it "one of her most engaging efforts". Warner Bros. followed it with 1978's Quarter Moon in a Ten Cent Town, which was considered to have "over-careful production", according to Grant Alden. It made the top five of the US country chart, the top 25 of the US all-genre chart, the top ten of the Canadian country chart and later certified gold in sales. The albums spawned the number one US and Canadian country singles "Making Believe", "To Daddy" and "Two More Bottles of Wine". They also spawned a top ten cover of "You Never Can Tell (C'est La Vie)" and the US top 20 original tune "Easy From Now On".

Harris' record label proposed shifting her career towards country pop crossover stardom. Instead, Harris recorded two traditionally-oriented albums, beginning with 1979's Blue Kentucky Girl. It was a top-ten disc on the North American country charts and received a gold certification. It also won a Grammy Award for Best Female Country Vocal Performance. The follow-up was 1980's Roses in the Snow, which was considered to embed bluegrass sounds. Like its predecessor, Roses in the Snow went gold and reached the number two on the country charts in the US and Canada. Harris' new bluegrass sound was credited to the new Hot Band member Ricky Skaggs, who replaced Rodney Crowell. Both albums spawned top ten US and Canadian country singles: "Save the Last Dance for Me", "Blue Kentucky Girl", "Wayfaring Stranger". Additionally, "Beneath Still Waters" went to the number one spot in both countries. Billboard named Blue Kentucky Girl among its April 1979 "Top Album Picks", calling Harris' voice "crystal clear", while Cashbox magazine highlighted Harris's "beautiful, sensitive voice" on Roses in the Snow.

Harris gave birth to a second daughter during this period and briefly stopped touring. Shortly beforehand, the Christmas-themed Light of the Stable (1979) was released and was followed by Evangeline (1981). The latter was a studio collection compiled from songs that were "left off" previous albums. Evangeline certified gold in sales and reached number five on the US country chart. It spawned a cover of "Mister Sandman", which topped the Canadian country chart, reached the US country top ten and made the US pop top 40. Although the song's album version featured harmony vocals from Dolly Parton and Linda Ronstadt, Harris harmonized with herself for the single version. Harris also collaborated with Roy Orbison during this time for the 1980 single "That Lovin' You Feeling Again". It would later win the Grammy for Best Country Vocal Performance by a Duo or Group. Harris also won the Female Vocalist of the Year award from the Country Music Association.

=== 1981–1990: Commercial decline, comeback with Trio and further Warner Bros. releases ===
Around 1981, Ricky Skaggs left the Hot Band and was replaced by Barry Tashian. Drummer John Ware also left Harris' backing group, which prompted her to reform the Hot Band with new members. Her next studio album, Cimarron (1981) was cut with the new Hot Band. It made the US country albums top ten and the US all-genre top 50. It spawned the US and Canadian top ten country songs "Born to Run" and "Tennessee Rose". A duet with Don Williams called "If I Needed You" topped the Canadian country chart. In 1982, Harris and the Hot Band recorded her first live album, titled Last Date. Its lead single was a vocal version of Floyd Cramer's instrumental original song "Last Date". The single topped the US country chart and was followed by the top-five single "I'm Movin' On". Both albums received mixed reviews, with Grant Alden of No Depression finding that Cimarron and Last Date are no "monumental artistic statement" but occasionally "have their moments". William Ruhlmann of AllMusic gave Last Date 2.5 stars, explaining that Harris failed to create original styles and arrangements that previously set her apart.

Harris' final album under Brian Ahern's production (the pair would then divorce) was released in 1983, called White Shoes. The disc featured a collection of cover songs. Among its tracks were the singles "Pledging My Love" and "In My Dreams", both of which reached the US and Canadian country top ten. White Shoes was among her lowest-peaking albums to date on the US country chart, stalling at number 22. Harris then relocated to Nashville, where she collaborated with new producer Paul Kennerley, whom she married in 1985. The pair composed The Ballad of Sally Rose, which was released by Warner Bros. in 1985. Featuring compositions written by Harris herself, The Ballad of Sally Rose was loosely based on her time with Gram Parsons. Despite reaching the US country top ten the album ultimately resulted in poor record sales and was considered a commercial failure. Yet its embedding of various musical styles was praised by critics.

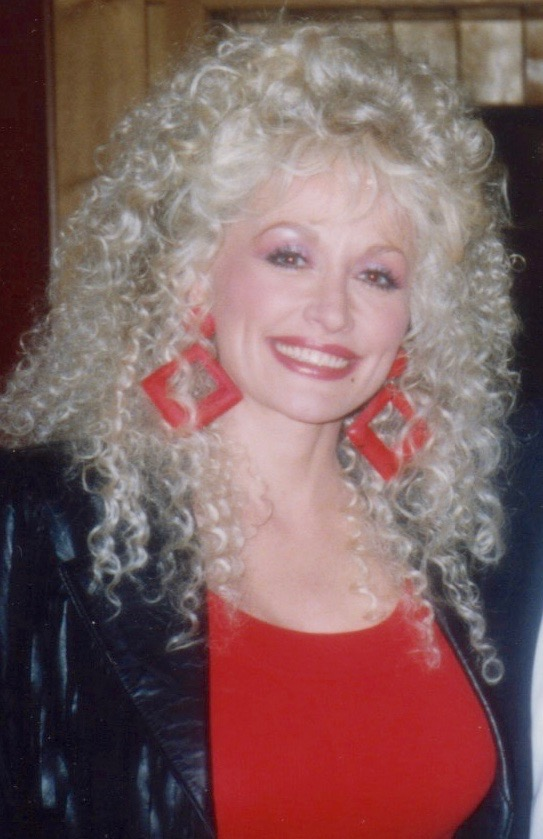
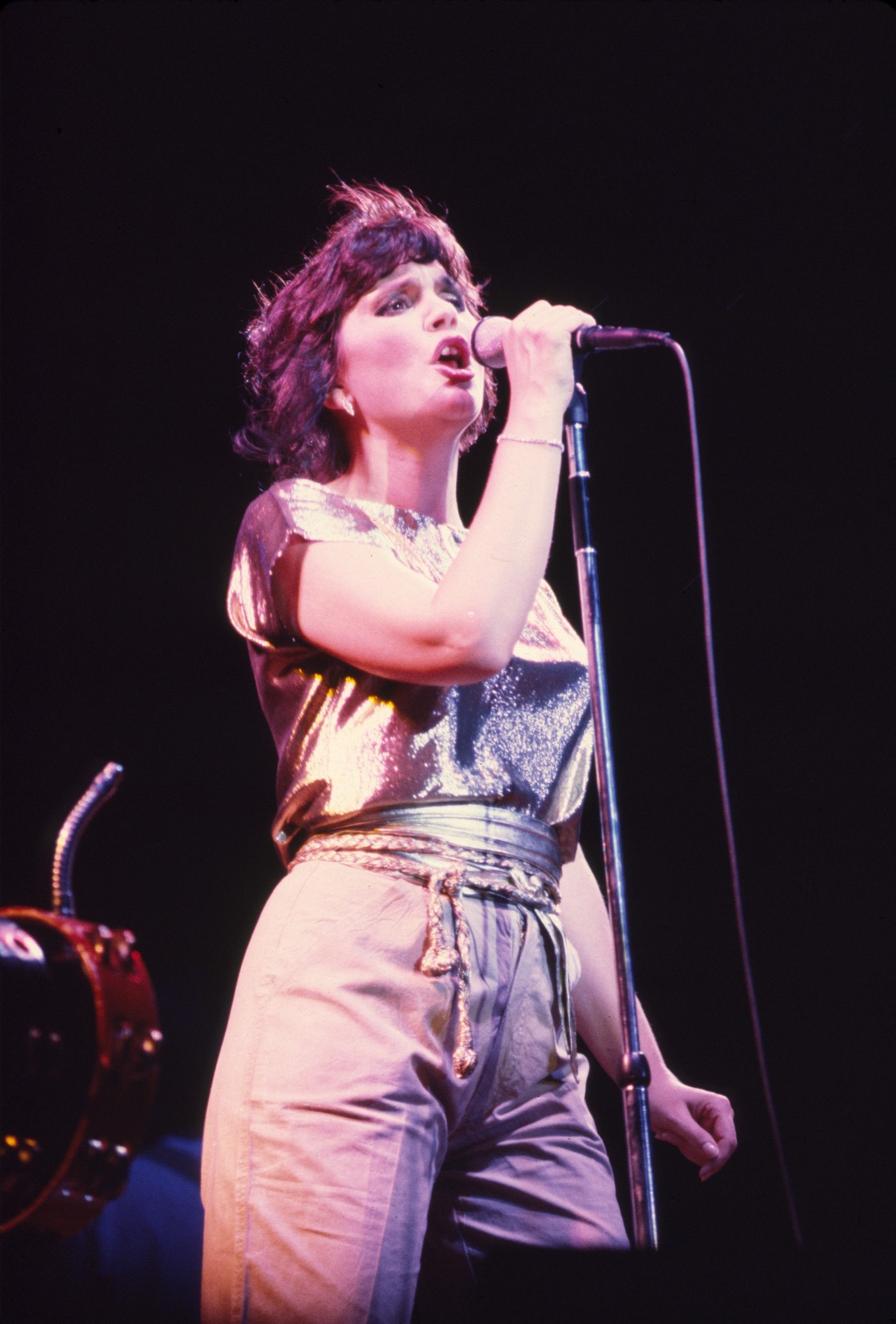
In the middle 1980s, Harris collaborated alongside friends Dolly Parton (left) and Linda Ronstadt (right) to record the album Trio. The album was critically acclaimed and a commercial success.

In 1986, Warner Bros. released her next studio album, Thirteen. The disc was described by Rolling Stone as a "roots record" with comparisons drawn to 1980's Roses in the Snow. However, the album proved to be less successful. Both of its singles reached positions outside the top 40 on the North American country charts. Although recorded prior to Thirteen, Angel Band followed on Warner Bros. in 1987 and was an album of gospel material. Rolling Stone described it as a "solid but [low-key]" gospel project". It was Harris' third album to only reach the Billboard country top 25.

In 1987, Harris collaborated with Dolly Parton and Linda Ronstadt to record the studio album, Trio. The women had been friends for over a decade and had intentions to record an album together for years. Several tracks that had originally been laid down were scrapped and replaced by a new studio collection of country–folk songs. Trio featured Harris, Parton and Ronstadt singing together in harmony and often featured one of the women singing lead vocals. Trio became a commercial success and is the best-selling disc of Harris' career. Following its March 1987 release, Trio reached number one on the US country chart, number six on the US all-genre list, number 12 in Australia and number four in Canada. Spawned from the disc were the North American top ten country songs "To Know Him Is to Love Him", "Telling Me Lies", "Those Memories of You" and "Wildflowers".

In 1989, Warner Bros. released the solo album Bluebird. It included material penned by songwriters Kate McGarrigle and Anna McGarrigle, and two songs penned by Harris herself. Considered a country rock effort by Rolling Stone the album peaked in the top 20 of both the US and Canadian country charts. Its lead single, "Heartbreak Hill", returned Harris to the top ten as a solo artist and was followed by the top 20 single, "Heaven Only Knows". Her final studio album with Warner Bros. was released in 1990, titled Brand New Dance. It was categorized as an "uninspired misfire" by Rolling Stone while AllMusic drew similar comparisons to Harris seeming disengaged with the material.

=== 1991–1999: New artistic directions and further collaborations ===
Around 1991, Harris dissolved the Hot Band and formed a new backing group called the Nash Ramblers. The group included Sam Bush playing fiddle, Al Perkins playing banjo and guitar, and Jon Randall performing various instruments. Harris then intended to record a live album of material she had never performed before. Music executive Bonnie Garner suggested recording the set at the Ryman Auditorium (the former site of the Grand Ole Opry, which was becoming increasingly dilapidated). In spring 1991, Harris and the Nash Ramblers recorded the live project over three nights with only 200 guests in attendance. The live disc was released in 1992 and was titled At the Ryman and was met with critical acclaim. Writers have since speculated the project brought renewed interest to the Ryman Auditorium and several months following the album, the venue was refurbished.

Harris was also president of the Country Music Foundation in the early 1990s and became an official member of the Grand Ole Opry in 1992. Harris also departed from Warner–Reprise during this period and signed a new contract with Asylum Records. In 1993, the label released the studio project Cowgirl's Prayer. It was Harris' last project produced by Paul Kennerley and the pair divorced shortly afterward. The album made the top 40 of the US country albums chart and the top 20 of the Canadian country albums chart. Despite critical acclaim its singles received limited radio airplay. Two of its singles made the US and Canada country charts, but failed to make positions inside the top 40.

By the middle 1990s, Harris was feeling excluded by country music radio. Asylum Records gave her the musical freedom to record her next album. In 1995, Asylum issued the studio album Wrecking Ball. The disc was produced by Daniel Lanois (known for producing U2 and Peter Gabriel), who embedded an alternative rock style into its sound and style. According to the Los Angeles Times, its production has been considered influential in establishing the Americana music genre. Although ignored by country radio, Wrecking Ball reached number 94 on the US albums chart, number 58 in Canada number 46 in the UK and received the Grammy Award for Best Contemporary Folk Album. Jason Ankeny of AllMusic called it "a hypnotic, staggeringly beautiful work", while Allison Hussey of Pitchfork called it "a staggering work that defied expectations for what a middle-aged woman should be doing with her time."

In 1998, Harris's third live album, Spyboy, was released. It featured live cuts of songs that Harris had recorded throughout her career. It was recorded with Harris's new backing band, which were also called Spyboy. Also in 1998, Harris appeared on Willie Nelson's Teatro album, featuring production from Harris then-producer Lanois.

In 1999, Asylum issued the second collaborative album by Harris, Parton and Ronstadt titled Trio II. Although the project was completed in 1994, it took five years to be released. Trio II rose to the number four position on the North American country album charts certified gold in the United States. Time called the disc "an angelic encounter", while The Washington Post found it was "not worth the wait" due to the disc's "sense of familiarity". Its single "After the Gold Rush" brought the three artists the Best Country Collaboration with Vocals accolade from the Grammys. Meanwhile, Harris and Ronstadt had been wanting to make their own collaborative album together. After years of discussion and planning, the pair released Western Wall: The Tucson Sessions. The album was also released on Asylum in 1999. Within a month, the collaborative project reached number six on the US country chart and number 73 on the US Billboard 200.

=== 2000–2011: From song interpreter to singer-songwriter ===
Harris parted ways with her record label and management during this period. In 2000, she signed with Nonesuch Records and that year the label released her first solo studio album in five years, called Red Dirt Girl. It was Harris' first disc since The Ballad of Sally Rose that featured mostly self-written recordings. It also featured Bruce Springsteen and Patty Griffin singing background vocals. Time called it "a surprisingly raw and confessional collection" while The Guardian called it "superb". Red Dirt Girl rose to number five on the US country albums chart, number 54 on the US all-genre chart, number three on the Canadian country albums chart and number 29 on the Canadian all-genre chart. Its single "I Don't Wanna Talk About It Now" was Harris' first to make the US Adult Alternative Airplay chart. Red Dirt Girl won Harris another Grammy for Best Contemporary Folk album. Harris also contributed to the soundtrack of O Brother, Where Art Thou?, which won a Grammy for Album of the Year.

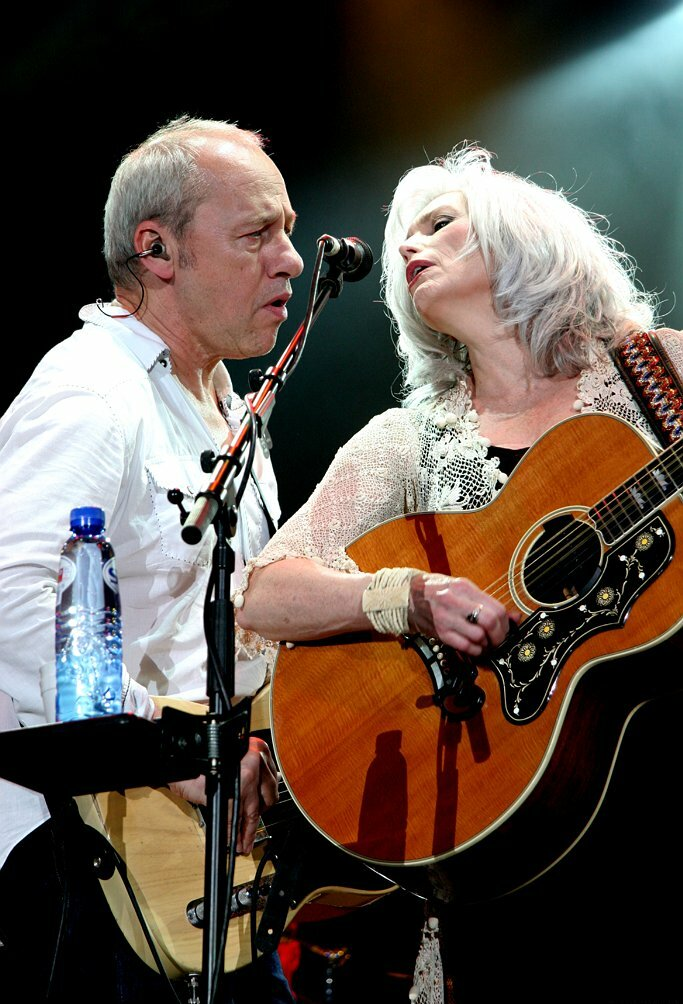
In 2006, Harris joined Mark Knopfler of Dire Straits fame to record All the Roadrunning. Pictured is the pair performing live in The Netherlands.

In 2003, Harris followed up with her next studio release Stumble into Grace. Like its predecessor, the album contained self-penned songs. It also featured harmony vocals from Linda Ronstadt. Allmusic's Mark Deming commented that "Stumble into Grace shows she's still playing at the top of her game" and Billboard called it "a very affecting record". The album reached the US country top ten and made the top 20 in both Norway and Sweden. During this period, Harris also toured frequently alongside Elvis Costello and recorded the song "The Scarlet Tide" (the original version of the song was featured in the soundtrack of Cold Mountain). In 2005, Harris recorded the song "A Love That Will Never Grow Old", which appeared in the LGBT film Brokeback Mountain.

Harris and Mark Knopfler (formerly of the band Dire Straits) spent seven years writing and recording songs, which would make up their collaborative studio effort, All the Roadrunning. Some of the songs on the collection were originally for a different Knopfler project but were instead used for All the Roadrunning. In 2006, it became a top 20 disc on the US album chart but reached the top ten in the UK and Sweden. In Norway, the album topped the all-genre chart. Spawned from the disc was the single "This Is Us", which reached number five on the US Adult Alternative Airplay chart and number 17 in Norway. The Washington Post called the album "a smart marriage of strengths and weaknesses" and AllMusic found it to be a "lush and earthy collaboration".

In 2008, a solo album titled All I Intended to Be was released. It featured Brian Ahern producing the project. Contributors included Vince Gill and Dolly Parton. Harris then toured in support of the album with an ensemble she dubbed the Red Dirt Boys. It reached the top five of the US country albums chart, the top 25 of the Billboard 200 and the top ten on the Swedish all-genre chart. In 2010, Harris re-recorded her song "Boulder to Birmingham" with the rock group the Fray and was issued as a single by Epic Records that year.

In 2011, Nonesuch Records released Harris' fourth self-composed album Hard Bargain. The project was produced by Nashville's Jay Joyce. Similar to her previous albums, its songs reflected themes about southern culture. Among its tracks was a song about the life of Emmett Till, a teenage boy murdered in the American south during the 1950s. Hard Bargain reached the US country albums top five, the US all-genre top 20, the Canadian top 20, the UK top 30 and the Norwegian top 15. Ken Tucker of NPR called Hard Bargain both "invigorating" and "inviting". Steven Rosen of American Songwriter found Harris' songwriting on the album to occasionally "stumble" but also do well in "addressing personal sadness".

=== 2012–present: Rodney Crowell collaborations and recent endeavors ===
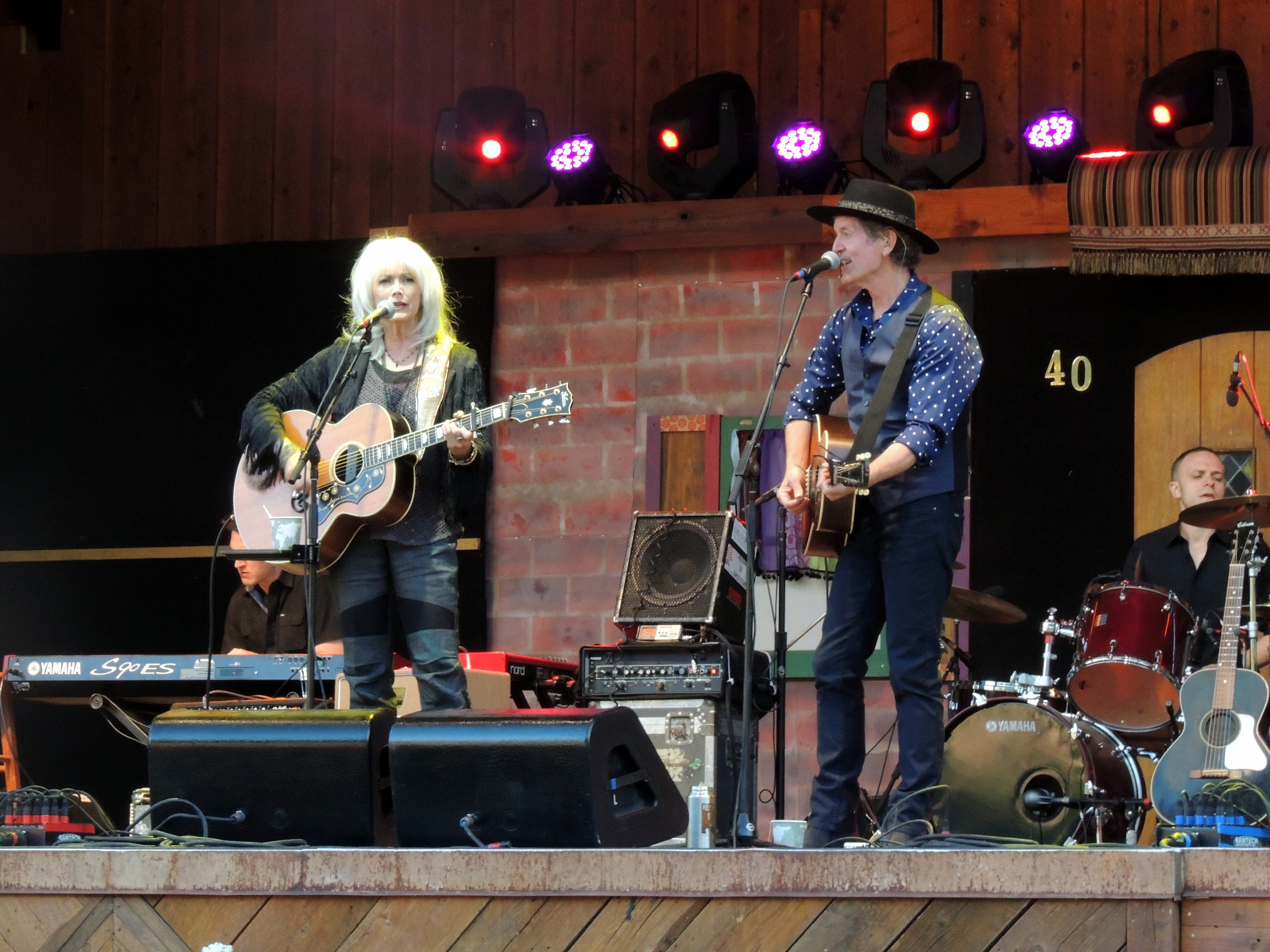
Harris teamed up with Rodney Crowell to record two albums in the 2010s. Pictured above, Crowell and Harris are seen performing in 2012.

Harris agreed to contribute to the soundtrack of Nick Cave's 2012 film Lawless. She recorded three songs that appeared on the soundtrack. The Montreal Gazette described Harris' vocal performance on Lawless as "serene". Harris released an album of duets with Rodney Crowell in 2013 called Old Yellow Moon. Although a duet album was discussed for years, the timing never worked out due to their different schedules. The pair re-recorded songs that had previously appeared on their individual albums. Slant Magazine found Old Yellow Moon to balance "retro-country and retro-rock with a sure and satisfying sense of balance" and USA Today named the project one of its "Albums of the Week" in February 2013. Old Yellow Moon reached number four on the US country chart, number 29 on the US all-genre chart, number six in Norway and number 42 in the UK. It later won a Grammy award. It was followed in 2015 by the pair's second album, The Traveling Kind and was a tribute to songwriters like Kris Kristofferson and Roger Miller. Rolling Stone awarded it three stars out of five and four out of five stars from American Songwriter. The Traveling Kind reached the top ten of the US country chart.

In 2014, Harris announced a book deal with Blue Rider, a Penguin Books publishing imprint. In 2017, she told The Capital Times that the piece would be a memoir of her life. In 2021, Harris told Clash magazine that she was still writing her memoir. In 2021, Nonesuch Records released the live disc Ramble in Music City: The Lost Concert, which was recorded with The Nash Ramblers in 1990 but was first shelved. In 2021, Harris told Clash magazine that she was no longer writing songs because she didn't "feel the need" and have the sense of "urgency". However, she continues to perform and play shows.

In 2025, Harris appeared in the feature documentary Lilith Fair: Building a Mystery – The Untold Story, which reflects on the legacy of the all-female music festival.

== Artistry ==
=== Influences ===
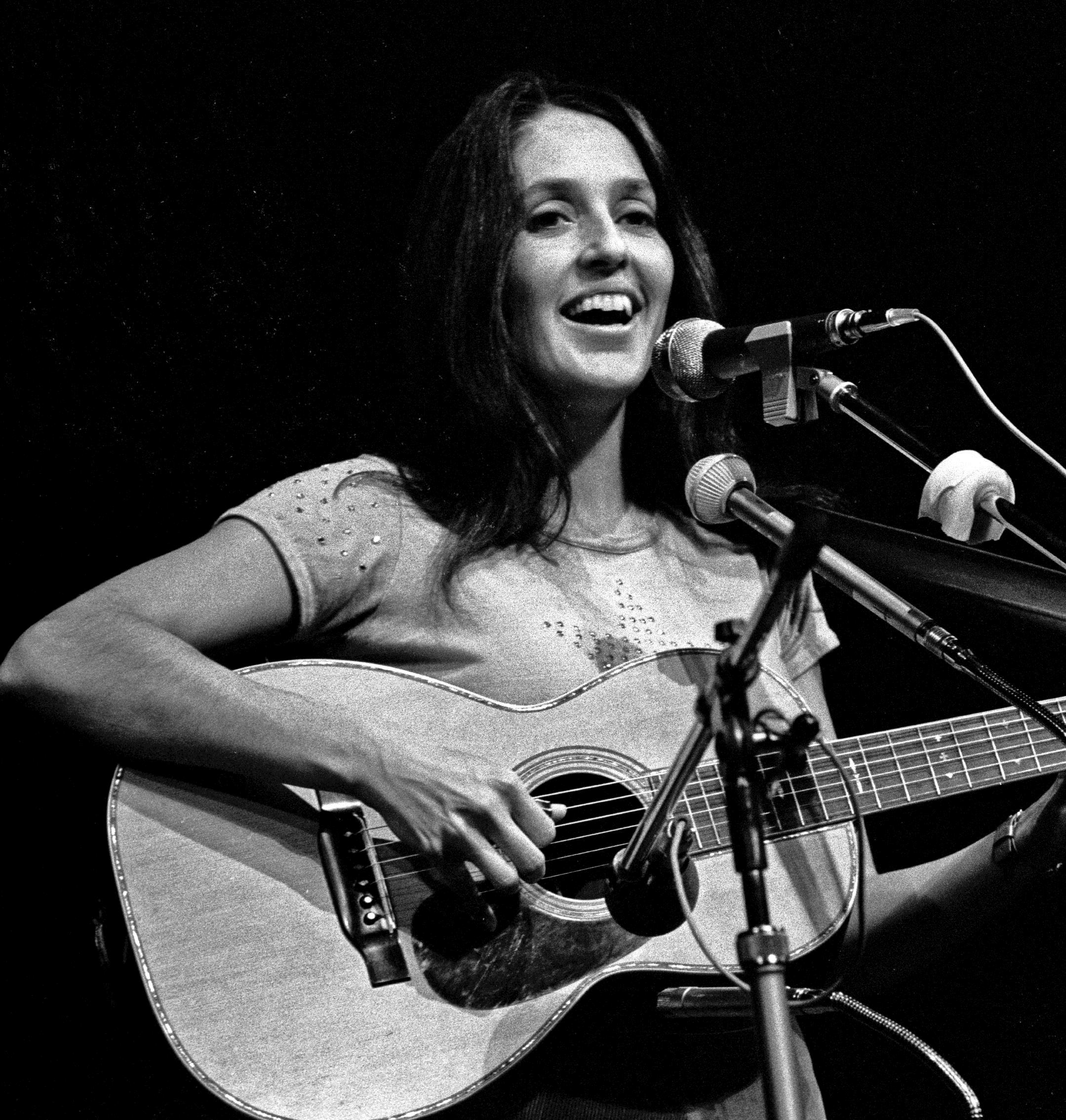
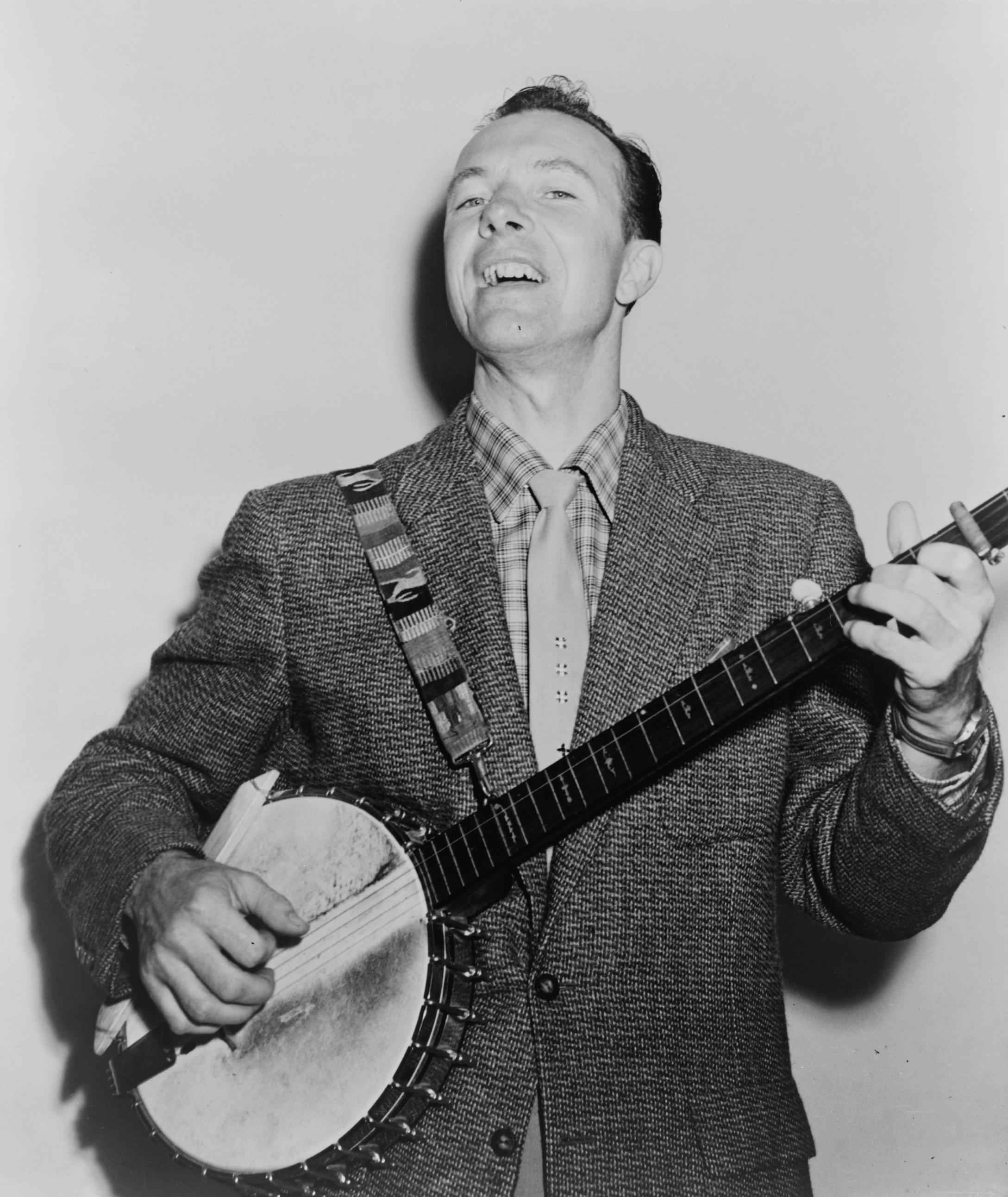
Harris' major influences include Joan Baez (left) and Pete Seeger (right)

Harris found her first appreciation for music through the folk genre during the American folk revival. During her adolescence, she listened to American University's WAMU radio station, which played folk music nightly. Harris taught herself to play the guitar, sing and follow along with the radio. Harris' early folk influences included Ian & Sylvia, Peter, Paul and Mary, Buffy Sainte-Marie, Judy Collins, and Bob Dylan. Harris was also influenced by Pete Seeger. At age 16, she wrote him a letter wondering if her life was too privileged to be singing about the story lines in folk songs. Another significant influence was Joan Baez, whom she recalled having a "spiritual" connection to. "I worshiped her. Still do in a way, because she just changed my whole focus on music," she told Rolling Stone.

Harris received further exposure to country music and developed an appreciation for it through her collaborations with Gram Parsons. She told The Columbus Dispatch that she had not taken the genre seriously up to that point because she did not see the artistry of it. Parsons exposed Harris to the music of the Louvin Brothers, Bill Monroe and George Jones. Their songs became a significant influence on her. "These were deep, emotionally troubling songs, but he opened my ears to the beauty of it, the simplicity of the poetry," she explained. Harris hired Rodney Crowell to join her band when she became a solo act. His traditional Texan country background was said by Harris to influence her country music artistry. "I think that his presence in the early part of my career, first as a songwriter and then as a member of the band and then as kind of my soul brother, musically, was really important to getting my footing as a performing artist," Harris commented.

=== Musical styles, musicianship and collaborations ===
Writers, editors and historians have largely identified Harris with the country rock musical style. Harris took the sound of California folk rock and embedded it with traditional country. Author Frank Hoffman wrote, "Emmylou Harris has maintained a successful recording career over four decades by maintaining a steadfast allegiance to roots styles in the face of rampant technological change and media image manipulation." David DiMartio found that her 1970s albums merged rock with classic country in a way that helped Harris receive fans young and old. Buzz McClain of The Washington Post said that Harris' albums helped "define" the country rock music style. Authors Mary A. Bufwack and Robert K. Oermann concluded that Harris was the "beacon" of the country rock movement during the 1970s and 1980s.

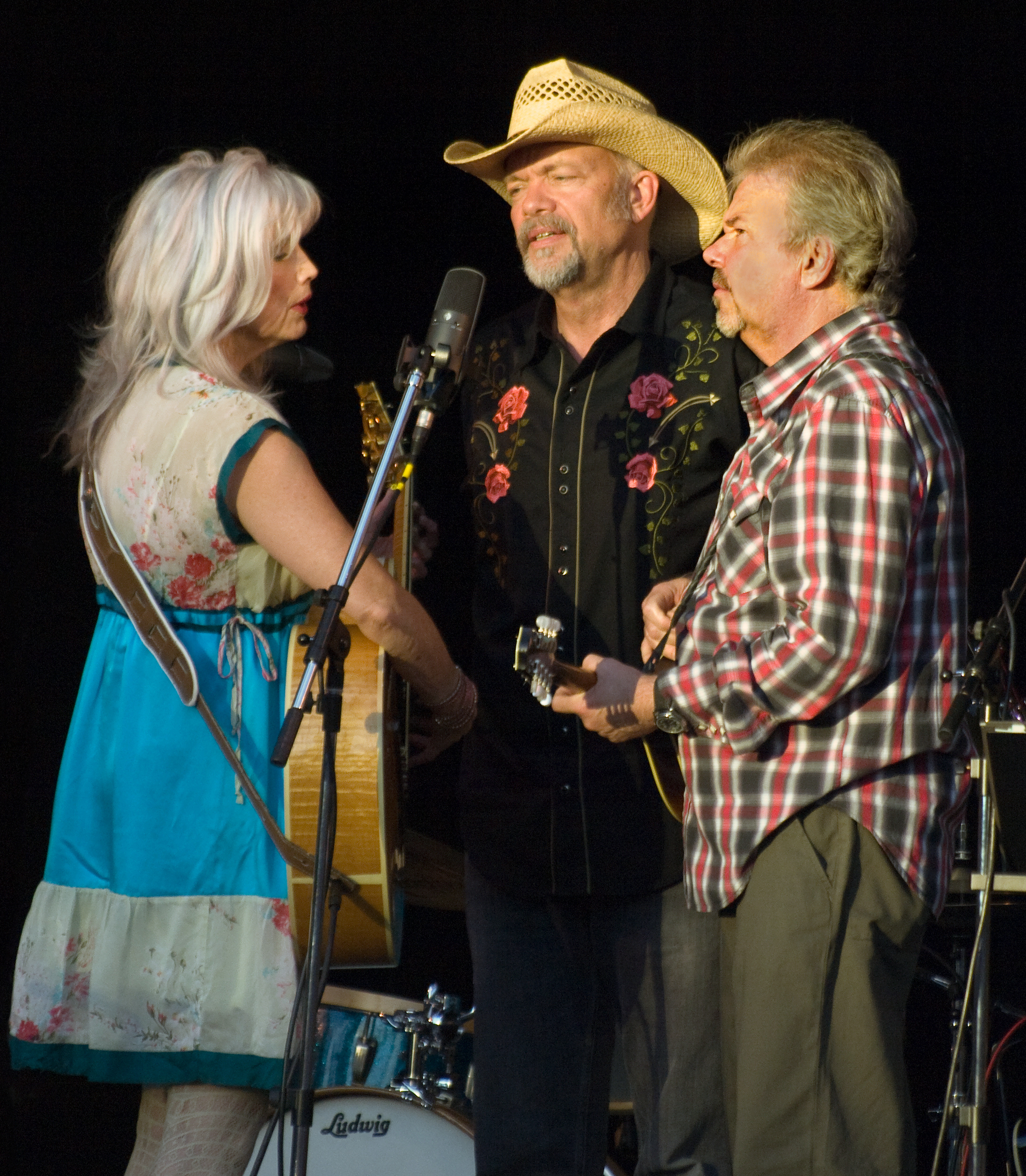
Harris performing onstage in Seattle, Washington with Phil Madeira and Ricky Simpkins, 2008.

As Harris' career progressed, she took more inspiration from the alternative music community. Critics have pointed to 1995's Wrecking Ball as a turning point in her musical style. The album's production was said to embed new aspects of rock that had not been in her music previously. From then on, critics credited Harris with helping to define the alternative country sub genre. Writers have also categorized her music as progressive country and outlaw country. Her association with other genres has led authors to consider her a forerunner for the Americana style, a genre centered on roots music. Rolling Stone has since given the moniker of the "Godmother of Americana".

Harris's musicianship has also been discussed and spoken about. She often sought out other musicians to enhance and develop her musical style. This started with Harris' first backing group the Hot Band, which was formed when her first record label needed studio musicians for her recordings. "We gotta put the chick singer together with a hot band," Harris recalled someone at her record company saying. From then on, Harris collaborated with her backing musicians to help enhance her style and performances onstage. The Country Music Hall of Fame and Museum explained how her backing bands influenced the way her musical style shifted as years went by. Harris herself explained that her style of country music embedded more rock influences compared to previous interpretations of the genre.

Harris' artistry has also been remembered for her collaborations with various artists. She has made appearances on songs recorded by Ryan Adams, Neil Young, Johnny Cash, Sheryl Crow, and numerous others. "It's likely that on her school report it was said of the young Emmylou Harris that 'she plays well with others'," wrote Bernard Zuel of The Sydney Morning Herald. Noah Berlatsky of The Atlantic wrote that Harris' own career "was never precisely solo" because of her emphasis on collaborating with other artists. "Her enthusiasm for finding new artists to work with has been a huge boon for her music," he commented. Harris herself stated, "I think it's just a willingness to be a part of the landscape, in a way. I've been very lucky in that all (my) collaborations have been real musical and very satisfying and inspiring."

=== Vocals ===
Writers have characterized Harris's singing voice as that of a soprano, and she is described as being both "delicate" and "crystalline". Stephen Holden of The New York Times wrote, "Emmylou Harris's voice is an alloy of crystal and steel, and this mixture of delicacy and resilience lends her the aura of an idealized frontier woman." Jason Ankeny of AllMusic wrote, "Blessed with a crystalline voice, a remarkable gift for phrasing, and a restless creative spirit, few artists had as profound an impact on contemporary music as Emmylou Harris." Harris herself explained that her voice sounds unique because it is rooted in folk styles: "I didn't have a style or a voice of my own. And in singing country, I was singing in a folk voice. I didn't have what you would consider a true country voice like Loretta Lynn, Kitty [Wells] or Tammy [Wynette], or some of the younger singers; Tanya Tucker – great voice. But my voice was always more on the side of folk."

== Legacy, influence and awards ==
Emmylou Harris has striven to follow a consistent music direction in her career that has helped influence modern contemporary music. Through her fusion of the country and rock genres, Harris helped to unite rural country audiences and metropolitan rock audiences together in one setting. Jason Ankeny of AllMusic wrote, "She traveled a singular artistic path, proudly carrying the torch of "cosmic American music" passed down by her mentor, Gram Parsons, which made a profound mark on both country and rock." Mary A. Bufwack and Robert K. Oermann wrote, "She showed Nashville that country music could succeed uncompromised, with dignity intact. She made country music hip." Harris is also credited with influencing the neotraditional country sub-genre that was established in the 1980s and 1990s. The Continuum Encyclopedia of Popular Music of the World wrote, "Harris would carry the torch into the following decades as a revered country music traditionalist who respected and drew inspiration from the west coast pioneers."

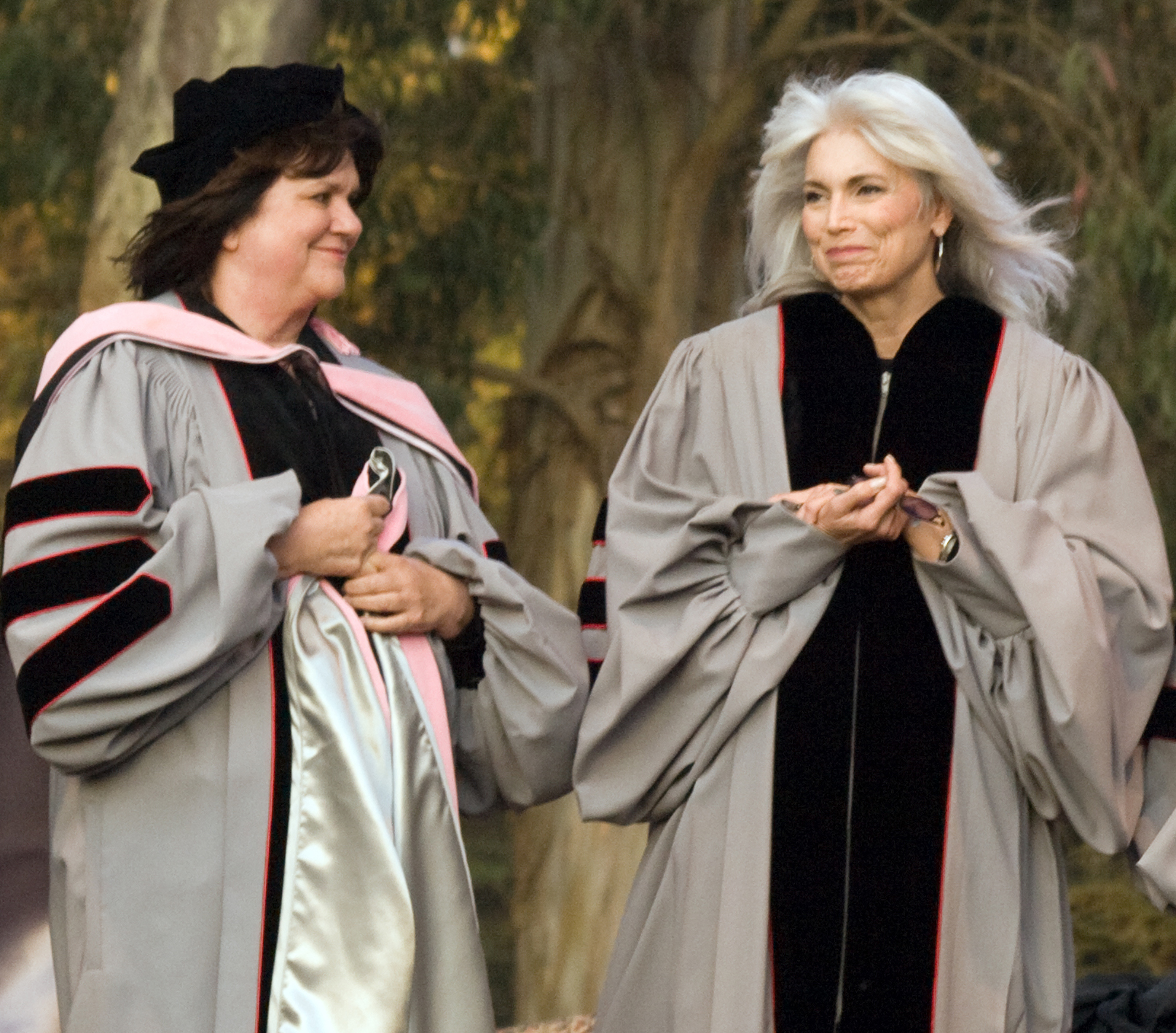
Accompanied by Linda Ronstadt, Harris receives an honorary doctorate from the Berklee College of Music, 2009.

Writer David DiCaire called Harris one of American music's most well-remembered voices. Marissa R. Moss of The Guardian called her "one of music's most revered voices" and "one of America's finest interpreters of song". Chuck Dauphin of Billboard wrote, "Nobody can deliver a song aching with sadness and loneliness quite like Emmylou Harris. When she pours her heart and soul into a lyric, you are instantly grabbed emotionally in a way that few artists can." In 2023, Rolling Stone ranked Harris at number 79 on its list of the "200 Greatest Singers of All Time", further commenting that she is "arguably the greatest American harmony vocalist of the past half-century".

Bufwack and Oermann explained how Harris's music changed the direction of country music decades later. In the years following her rise to success, Harris was considered a major influence on several country artists during the 1980s and 1990s. Miranda Lambert credited Harris as an artist determined to make her own choices and choose her own direction. Reflecting on her artistic decisions, Trisha Yearwood commented, "I've had to say to myself, well, if I passed Emmylou Harris on the street, would I be able to hold my head up?" Harris has also been a credited influence on Ryan Adams, Mary Chapin Carpenter, Sheryl Crow, Vince Gill, Patty Loveless, Martina McBride, Reba McEntire, Kacey Musgraves, Margo Price, LeAnn Rimes, Pam Tillis, Carrie Underwood and Wilco.

In 1999, Harris received the Billboard Century Award, which is given to "the uncommon excellence of one artist's still-unfolding body of work." In 2003, she was inducted into the Alabama Music Hall of Fame. Along with the Statler Brothers and Tom T. Hall, Harris was inducted into the Country Music Hall of Fame and Museum in 2008. In 2009, Linda Ronstadt and Earl Scruggs were present when Harris received an honorary doctorate from the Berklee College of Music. At the 2012 Academy of Country Music "Honors" ceremony, Harris was presented with the Cliffie Stone Pioneer Award. In 2015, Harris and Evelyn Glennie received Sweden's Polar Music Prize. Along with Tina Turner, she was then presented the 2018 Grammy Lifetime Achievement Award.

Swedish folk duo First Aid Kit released the song "Emmylou" in 2012 as a tribute to Harris. They performed the song for her when she received the Polar Music Prize in 2015. In 2016, Harris was honored with a tribute concert entitled The Life & Songs of Emmylou Harris, which was later released as both a DVD and a live CD. The concert featured several of Harris's closest friends and collaborators, including Rodney Crowell, Alison Krauss, and Lucinda Williams. Harris also performed at the concert which included her singing "Boulder to Birmingham" with other artists that were part of the program. In 2025, She was honored by an all-star tribute at the Hardly Strictly Bluegrass festival on October 2, 2025, featuring fourteen performers and Harris herself, in recognition of the both festival's 25th anniversary and for Harris being the only artist to have performed at every edition of the festival since it began in 2001. A few days later on October 7, Harris was inducted into the Nashville Songwriters Hall of Fame in the artist/songwriter category.

== Activism and dog rescue ==
In 1997 and 1998, Harris performed in Sarah McLachlan's Lilith Fair concert series, which promoted female music artists. Since 1999, Harris has organized an annual benefit tour called Concerts for a Landmine-Free World. All proceeds from the tours support the Vietnam Veterans of America Foundation's (VVAF) efforts to assist innocent victims of conflicts around the world. The tour also benefits the VVAF's work to raise US awareness of the global land mine problem. Artists that have joined Harris on the road for these dates include Joan Baez, Mary Chapin Carpenter and Willie Nelson. She became a member of the newly formed Commission in the Humanities and Social Sciences of the American Academy of Arts and Sciences in 2011, which started as a way to promote research with the humanities and social sciences.

Since childhood, Harris has enjoyed caring for dogs and fantasized about establishing a dog rescue. In 2004, Harris' pet dog named Bonaparte died. To remember him, Harris decided to establish Bonaparte's Retreat, a dog rescue whose purpose was to save stray dogs from animal shelters and house them until they found their "forever home". The rescue resides in the Nashville area and often rescues dogs that are taken from the Metro Nashville Animal Care and Control facility. It also supports elderly or sickly dogs that are in need of a home. Harris helps raise funds for the program by creating concerts that sponsor the rescue. Bonaparte's Retreat also works with a program that pairs troubled youth with foster animals. "I think this is something that will affect their lives in a good way on into their adult lives," she commented.

== Personal life ==
Harris has been married and divorced three times and has called herself a "really good ex-wife". In 1969, Harris met fellow folk artist Tom Slocum while living in New York City's Greenwich Village. They married the same year. In 1970, she gave birth to her first daughter, Hallie. In 1971, the couple divorced. In the early years of her career, Harris often took her daughter on the road with her. However, Hallie spent most of her time living with her grandparents in Maryland. "I don't think the road is good for kids. Once in a while it's fun, like a trip to Disneyland. But not as a way of life," Harris commented. In 1977, Harris married her then-producer, Brian Ahern. The couple married at Ahern's home in Halifax, Nova Scotia. The couple then lived in the Studio City neighborhood of Los Angeles, California. Harris then welcomed her second child, Meghann, in 1979. In 1984, the couple divorced and Harris relocated to Nashville, Tennessee. In 1985, Harris married songwriter and record producer Paul Kennerley. For several years, Harris and her family lived in an older home located near the Music Row neighborhood in Nashville. In 1993, Kennerley and Harris divorced.

Harris has a granddaughter who was born in 2009 and a grandson born in 2012. She is a vegetarian. Her father died in 1993 after having an aortic rupture. Harris's mother then lived with her for 21 years until her death in 2014. "She's just about my best friend. She has an extraordinary gift of making a home a home without being intrusive", Harris told CBS News in 2002.

== Discography ==
Studio albums as a solo artist

- Gliding Bird (1969)
- Pieces of the Sky (1975)
- Elite Hotel (1975)
- Luxury Liner (1976)
- Quarter Moon in a Ten Cent Town (1978)
- Blue Kentucky Girl (1979)
- Light of the Stable (1979)
- Roses in the Snow (1980)
- Evangeline (1981)
- Cimarron (1981)
- White Shoes (1983)
- The Ballad of Sally Rose (1985)
- Thirteen (1986)
- Angel Band (1987)
- Bluebird (1989)
- Brand New Dance (1990)
- Cowgirl's Prayer (1993)
- Wrecking Ball (1995)
- Red Dirt Girl (2000)
- Stumble into Grace (2003)
- All I Intended to Be (2008)
- Hard Bargain (2011)

Studio albums as a collaboration

- GP (with Gram Parsons & The Fallen Angels) (1973)
- Grievous Angel (with Gram Parsons & The Fallen Angels) (1974)
- Trio (with Dolly Parton and Linda Ronstadt) (1987)
- Trio II (with Dolly Parton and Linda Ronstadt) (1999)
- Western Wall: The Tucson Sessions (with Linda Ronstadt) (1999)
- All the Roadrunning (with Mark Knopfler) (2006)
- Old Yellow Moon (with Rodney Crowell) (2013)
- The Traveling Kind (with Rodney Crowell) (2015)

Collaborations and other appearances

Main article: Emmylou Harris appearances
- Collaborations A–F
- Collaborations G–K
- Collaborations L–Q
- Collaborations R–Z

== Sources ==
- Dicaire, David (2008). The New Generation of Country Music Stars. McFarland. ISBN 978-0786437870.
- Bufwack, Mary A.; Oermann, Robert K. (2003). Finding Her Voice: Women in Country Music: 1800–2000. Nashville, TN: The Country Music Press & Vanderbilt University Press. ISBN 0-8265-1432-4.

Awards
First None recognized before	AMA Lifetime Achievement Award for Performing; 2002	Succeeded by Levon Helm
