= Cimarron (album) =

Studio album by Emmylou Harris
- Released: November 1981
- Genre: Country
- Label: Warner Bros. Nashville
- Producers: Brian Ahern, Don Williams, Garth Fundis

Emmylou Harris chronology
Evangeline (1981)	Cimarron (1981)	Last Date (1982)

Singles from Cimarron
- 1. "Tennessee Rose" Released: January 16, 1982; 2. "Born to Run" Released: May 29, 1982

Professional ratings
Review scores
Source	Rating
AllMusic	2.5/5 stars
The Austin Chronicle	4/5 stars

Cimarron is the ninth studio album by Emmylou Harris. As with its predecessor, Evangeline, the album was composed mostly of outtakes from other recording sessions that had not fit into any of Harris' other albums. As a result, critics at the time complained that the album was "choppy" and lacked a unifying sound. Nonetheless, the album did well on the U.S. country charts, and featured three top-ten country singles: "Born to Run" (not to be confused with the Bruce Springsteen song of the same name, although another Springsteen song, "The Price You Pay," also appears), "If I Needed You" (a duet with Don Williams), and "Tennessee Rose." It was nominated for a Grammy in 1982 for Best Country Vocal Performance, Female. In 2000, Eminent Records issued Cimarron for the first time on CD (it had been out of print since the late 1980s), with new liner notes and a bonus track, "Colors of Your Heart."

== Track listing ==
No.	Title	Writer(s)	Length
1.	"Rose of Cimarron"	Rusty Young	4:21
2.	"Spanish Is a Loving Tongue" (with Fayssoux Starling)	Traditional/arr. Brian Ahern	3:20
3.	"If I Needed You" (with Don Williams)	Townes Van Zandt	3:37
4.	"Another Lonesome Morning"	Clinton Codack Adcock, Wendy Special Thatcher	3:04
5.	"The Last Cheater's Waltz"	Sonny Throckmorton	5:37
6.	"Born to Run"	Paul Kennerley	3:48
7.	"The Price You Pay"	Bruce Springsteen	4:39
8.	"Son of a Rotten Gambler"	Chip Taylor	4:15
9.	"Tennessee Waltz"	Redd Stewart, Pee Wee King	2:30
10.	"Tennessee Rose"	Karen Brooks, Hank DeVito	5:34
11.	"Colors of Your Heart" (bonus track added to the 2000 and 2004 CD re-issue)	Rodney Crowell	4:20

== Personnel ==
- Brian Ahern - Acoustic Guitar, Electric Guitar, 6-String Bass, Ernie Ball Bass, Percussion
- Joe Allen - Electric Bass
- Mike Bowden - Bass
- Tony Brown - Piano, Electric Piano
- Barry Burton - Acoustic Guitar
- James Burton - Electric Guitar
- Charles Cochran - Electric Piano
- Donivan Cowart - Backing Vocals
- Rodney Crowell: Acoustic Guitar
- Hank DeVito - Pedal Steel
- Steve Fishell - Acoustic Hawaiian Guitar, Percussion, Pedal Steel
- Wayne Goodwin - Fiddle, Mandolin
- Emory Gordy Jr. - Bass, Electric Bass
- Glen Hardin - Piano, Electric Piano, String Arrangements
- Emmylou Harris - Vocals, Acoustic Guitar, Backing Vocals
- Don Johnson - Electric Piano
- Paul Kennerley - Acoustic Guitar
- David Kirby - Acoustic Guitar
- Albert Lee - Mandolin
- Kenny Malone - Drums, Conga
- Herb Pedersen - Banjo, Backing Vocals
- Mickey Raphael - Harmonica
- Frank Reckard - Electric Guitar, Gut-String Guitar
- Ricky Skaggs - Banjo, Fiddle, Backing Vocals
- Buddy Spicher - Viola
- Fayssoux Starling - Duet Vocals, Backing Vocals
- Barry Tashian - Acoustic Guitar, Electric Guitar, Backing Vocals
- John Ware - Drums
- Cheryl White - Backing Vocals
- Sharon White - Backing Vocals
- Don Williams - Duet Vocals

Technical personnel

- Brian Ahern - Producer, Engineer
- Donivan Cowart - Engineer
- Garth Fundis - Producer (3)
- Stuart Taylor - Engineer
- Don Williams - Producer (3)

== Charts ==
=== Weekly charts ===
Chart (1981–1982)	Peak position
US Billboard 200	46
US Top Country Albums (Billboard)	6

=== Year-end charts ===
Chart (1982)	Position
US Top Country Albums (Billboard)	27

== Release history ==
Release history and formats for Cimarron
Region	Date	Format	Label	Ref.
North America	November 1981	LP; cassette	Warner Bros. Records	
