= Blue Kentucky Girl (Emmylou Harris album) =

Studio album by Emmylou Harris
- Released: April 13, 1979
- Recorded: Nashville, 1979
- Genre: Country
- Label: Warner Bros. Nashville
- Producer: Brian Ahern

Emmylou Harris chronology
Quarter Moon in a Ten Cent Town (1978)	Blue Kentucky Girl (1979)	Light of the Stable (1979)

Blue Kentucky Girl is the sixth studio album by American country music artist Emmylou Harris, released in 1979. The album features Harris delving into more traditional country than the country-rock sound of her previous releases. Songs include work by Willie Nelson and Gram Parsons. Rodney Crowell's "Even Cowgirls Get the Blues" featured harmonies by Dolly Parton and Linda Ronstadt, and came out of the women's ill-fated 1978 recording sessions, where they first attempted to record a "trio" album (they succeeded in doing so nearly a decade later with their 1987 album Trio).

== Critical reception ==
Professional ratings
Review scores
Source	Rating
AllMusic	3.5/5 stars
The Guardian	3/5 stars
The Rolling Stone Album Guide	3.5/5 stars

Jason Ankeny of AllMusic found "In response to criticism that her records weren't "country" enough, Harris recorded Blue Kentucky Girl, one of her most traditional outings. Relying on a more acoustic sound, the album largely forsakes contemporary pop songs in favor of standard country fare."

Bruce Smith of the New York Daily News remarked in his review, "Alabama born Emmylou Harris has abandoned her Malibu blue jeans for Nashville black velvet and white ruffles on this oddly formal country album...Those with an affection for Harris' singing style won't be disappointed by "Blue Kentucky Girl" although her soft rock fans with no taste for straight country might be disappointed."

Adam Sweeting of The Guardian claimed, "There are many brilliant songs...and this bunch showcases Emmy's inherent strengths: her clean, pure voice, impeccable choice of material and gift for picking the right musicians."

=== Accolades ===
Blue Kentucky Girl won a Grammy for Best Female Country Vocal Performance. In 2006, the album ranked No. 20 on CMT's "40 Greatest Albums in Country Music".

== Singles ==
"Beneath Still Waters" became Harris' fourth No. 1 hit; covers of the Drifters' 1960 hit "Save the Last Dance for Me" and the album's title track (originally recorded by Loretta Lynn) were top ten hits on the US country charts.

== Track listing ==
No.	Title	Writer(s)	Length
1.	"Sister's Coming Home" (with Tanya Tucker)	Willie Nelson	2:52
2.	"Beneath Still Waters"	Dallas Frazier	3:41
3.	"Rough and Rocky"	Lester Flatt, Earl Scruggs	3:50
4.	"Hickory Wind"	Gram Parsons, Bob Buchanan	4:01
5.	"Save the Last Dance for Me"	Doc Pomus, Mort Shuman	3:30
6.	"Sorrow in the Wind" (with Sharon & Cheryl White)	Jean Ritchie	3:28
7.	"They'll Never Take His Love from Me"	Leon Payne	2:34
8.	"Everytime You Leave" (with Don Everly)	Charlie Louvin, Ira Louvin	2:58
9.	"Blue Kentucky Girl"	Johnny Mullins	3:17
10.	"Even Cowgirls Get the Blues" (harmony by Linda Ronstadt and Dolly Parton)	Rodney Crowell	3:56
11.	"Cheatin' Is" (with Glen Campbell) (bonus track for 2004 CD re-issue)	Rafe Van Hoy	2:28
12.	"I Know an Ending When It Comes" (bonus track for 2004 CD re-issue)	Hank Cochran	2:52

== Personnel ==
- Brian Ahern – acoustic guitar, high-strung guitar, bass, percussion, 6-string banjo
- Duke Bardwell – bass
- Mike Bowden – bass
- Tony Brown – piano
- James Burton – electric guitar
- Rodney Crowell – acoustic guitar, high-strung guitar
- Lincoln Davis Jr. – accordion
- Hank DeVito – pedal steel
- Don Everly – duet vocals
- Emory Gordy Jr. – bass
- Glen Hardin – piano, string arrangements
- Emmylou Harris – vocals, acoustic guitar, electric guitar
- Ben Keith – pedal steel
- Albert Lee – acoustic guitar, electric guitar, mandolin
- Dolly Parton – backing vocals
- Bill Payne – piano
- Mickey Raphael – harmonica
- Linda Ronstadt – backing vocals
- Ricky Skaggs – fiddle, 5-string fiddle, mandolin, backing vocals
- Fayssoux Starling – backing vocals
- Tanya Tucker – duet vocals
- Ron Tutt – drums
- John Ware – drums
- Cheryl White – duet vocals, backing vocals
- Sharon White – duet vocals, backing vocals

Technical

- Brian Ahern – producer, engineer
- Donivan Cowart – engineer
- Bradley Hartman – engineer
- Stuart Taylor – engineer

== Charts ==
=== Weekly charts ===
Chart (1979)	Peak position
US Billboard 200	43
US Top Country Albums (Billboard)	3

=== Year-end charts ===
Chart (1979)	Position
US Top Country Albums (Billboard)	22
Chart (1980)	Position
US Top Country Albums (Billboard)	16

== Release history ==
Release history and formats for Blue Kentucky Girl
Region	Date	Format	Label	Ref.
North America	December 28, 1976	LP; cassette	Warner Bros. Records	
