= Emmylou Harris collaborations R–Z =

This article represents all appearances that Emmylou Harris has contributed to, in collaboration with artists from R to Z.

== Other sections ==
- Solo contributions
- Collaborations A–F
- Collaborations G–K
- Collaborations L–Q

Title	Collaborator(s)	Songwriter	Length	Producer	Source	Date	Notes
"I'm Blowin' Away"	Bonnie Raitt, Jackson Browne, JD Souther	Eric Kaz	3:22	Paul A. Rothchild	Home Plate by Bonnie Raitt	1975	
"Just Like You"	Jon Randall	Jon Randall Stewart	4:13	Sam Bush	What You Don't Know by Jon Randall	1995	
"Can't Hurt Anymore"	Jon Randall	Jon Randall	4:32	Brent Truitt, Jon Randall	Willin' by Jon Randall	1999	
"Perfect Day"	Lou Reed, Bono, Skye Edwards, David Bowie, Suzanne Vega, Elton John, Boyzone, Lesley Garrett, Burning Spear, Sir Thomas Allen, Brodsky Quartet, Heather Small, Tammy Wynette, Shane MacGowan, Sheona White, Dr. John, Robert Cray, Huey, Ian Broudie, Gabrielle, Evan Dando, Courtney Pine, BBC Symphony Orchestra, Brett Anderson, Visual Ministry Choir, Joan Armatrading, Laurie Anderson, Tom Jones	Lou Reed	3:46		Perfect Day by various artists (single for BBC's Children in Need charity appeal)	1997	
"Send Me the Sun"	Kimmie Rhodes	Kimmie Rhodes	3:55	Kimmie Rhodes	Love Me Like a Song by Kimmie Rhodes	2002	
"Love and Happiness for You"	Kimmie Rhodes	Emmylou Harris, Kimmie Rhodes	4:49	Kimmie Rhodes	Love Me Like a Song by Kimmie Rhodes	2002	
"One Has My Name (The Other Has My Heart)"	Riders in the Sky	Hal Blair, Eddie Dean, Dearest Dean	2:44	Joey Miskulin	Cowboys in Love by Riders in the Sky	1994	
"Little Joe, the Wrangler"	Roy Rogers	Ellis Tarrant, Marc Williams	2:45	Richard Landis	Tribute by Roy Rogers & The Sons of the Pioneers	1991	
"Happy Trails"	Roy Rogers, Dale Evans, Dusty Rogers, Daniele Alexander, Kathie Baillie, Michael Bonagura, Holly Dunn, Alan Jackson, The Kentucky Headhunters, Kathy Mattea, Roger Miller, Lorrie Morgan, Reed Nielsen, K.T. Oslin, Marie Osmond, Eddie Rabbitt, Restless Heart, Riders in the Sky, Johnny Rodriguez, Ricky Van Shelton, Marty Stuart, Sweethearts of the Rodeo, Randy Travis, Tanya Tucker	Dale Evans	3:21	Richard Landis	Tribute by Roy Rogers & The Sons of the Pioneers	1991	
"Walls"	Tammy Rogers	Tammy Rogers	4:20	Harry Stinson, Tammy Rogers	Tammy Rogers by Tammy Rogers	1996	
"My Blue Tears"	Linda Ronstadt, Dolly Parton	Dolly Parton	2:40	Peter Asher	Get Closer by Linda Ronstadt	1982	
"After the Gold Rush"	Linda Ronstadt	Neil Young	3:33	Linda Ronstadt, George Massenburg	Feels Like Home by Linda Ronstadt	1995	^{[D]}
"The Blue Train"	Linda Ronstadt	Jennifer Kimball, Tom Kimmel	5:04	Linda Ronstadt, George Massenburg	Feels Like Home by Linda Ronstadt	1995	
"Feels like Home"	Linda Ronstadt	Randy Newman	4:50	Linda Ronstadt, George Massenburg	Feels Like Home by Linda Ronstadt	1995	
"Lover's Return"	Linda Ronstadt	A.P. Carter, Mother Maybelle Carter, Sara Carter	4:01	Linda Ronstadt, George Massenburg	Feels Like Home by Linda Ronstadt	1995	
"I Can't Help It (If I'm Still in Love with You)"	Linda Ronstadt	Hank Williams	2:45	Peter Asher	Heart Like a Wheel by Linda Ronstadt	1974	
"Honky Tonk Blues"	Linda Ronstadt	Hank Williams	2:26	Peter Asher	The Linda Ronstadt Box Set by Linda Ronstadt	1974 / 1999	
"The Sweetest Gift"	Linda Ronstadt	James B. Coats	3:00	Peter Asher	Prisoner in Disguise by Linda Ronstadt	1975	
"Golden Ring"	Linda Ronstadt, Anna McGarrigle, Kate McGarrigle	Bobby Braddock, Rafe Van Hoy	3:59	Emmylou Harris, Michele Pepin	Tammy Wynette Remembered by various artists	1998	
"Love Letters from Old Mexico"	Leslie Satcher	Leslie Satcher	4:00	Luke Wooten	Love Letters by Leslie Satcher	2000	
"Pick Hits"	John Scofield, The Hot Band	John Scofield	6:52	John Scofield, Gene Harada	Pick Hits Live by John Scofield	1987	
"Wildwood Flower"	Randy Scruggs, Iris DeMent	traditional	3:46	Randy Scruggs	Crown of Jewels by Randy Scruggs	1998	
"Lullaby"	Dan Seals	Dan Seals, Rafe Van Hoy			On the Front Line by Dan Seals	1986	
"The Sweetest Gift"	The Seldom Scene, Linda Ronstadt	James B. Coats	2:51	Gary Oelze, John Starling, Bill Wolf, The Seldom Scene	15th Anniversary Celebration by The Seldom Scene	1988	
"Wheels"	The Seldom Scene	Chris Hillman, Gram Parsons	3:13	Gary Oelze, John Starling, Bill Wolf, The Seldom Scene	15th Anniversary Celebration by The Seldom Scene	1988	
"Pictures from Life's Other Side"	The Seldom Scene	traditional	6:02	T. Michael Coleman	Scene 20: 20th Anniversary Concert by The Seldom Scene	1991	
"Satan's Crown Jewel"	The Seldom Scene	Edgar Eden	4:27	T. Michael Coleman	Scene 20: 20th Anniversary Concert by The Seldom Scene	1991	
"I'm Going Crazy in 3/4 Time"	Billy Joe Shaver	Donivan Cowart, Rodney Crowell	3:29	Brian Ahern	Gypsy Boy by Billy Joe Shaver	1977	
"The Way I'm Watching You"	Snowracer		3:42			2005	
"Thing About You"	Southern Pacific	Tom Petty	3:51	Jim Ed Norman	Southern Pacific by Southern Pacific	1985	
"Great High Mountain"	Ralph Stanley, Judy Marshall	Keith Whitley	2:04	Charles R. Freeland	Saturday Night & Sunday Morning by Ralph Stanley	1992	
"Long Time Gone"	John Starling	Dickey Betts	3:42	Lowell George, Audie Ashworth	Long Time Gone by John Starling	1977	
"White Line"	John Starling	Willie P. Bennett	3:35	Lowell George, Audie Ashworth	Long Time Gone by John Starling	1977	
"Dark Hollow"	John Starling	traditional	3:25	Lowell George, Audie Ashworth	Long Time Gone by John Starling	1990	
"Roads and Other Reasons"	John Starling	B. Rabin	2:35	Lowell George, Audie Ashworth	Long Time Gone by John Starling	1990	
"Sin City"	John Starling	Chris Hillman, Gram Parsons	3:32	Lowell George, Audie Ashworth	Long Time Gone by John Starling	1990	
"In My Hour of Darkness"	John Starling and Carolina Star	Emmylou Harris, Gram Parsons	3:32	George Massenburg, John Starling	Slidin' Home by John Starling and Carolina Star	2007	
"Rachel"	Gary Stewart, Rodney Crowell	Rodney Crowell	3:40	Roy Dea	Your Place or Mine by Gary Stewart	1977	
	Marty Stuart			Marty Stuart	Let There Be Country by Marty Stuart	1992	^{[E]}
"Same Old Train"	Marty Stuart, Clint Black, Joe Diffie, Jerry Douglas, Merle Haggard, Alison Krauss, Patty Loveless, Earl Scruggs, Ricky Skaggs, Pam Tillis, Randy Travis, Travis Tritt, Dwight Yoakam	Marty Stuart	6:00	Marty Stuart	Tribute to Tradition by various artists	1998	
	Barry and Holly Tashian			Jim Rooney	Trust in Me by Barry and Holly Tashian	1989	^{[E]}
"I'll Take My Time Going Home"	Barry and Holly Tashian	Barry and Holly Tashian	3:03	Jim Rooney	Harmony by Barry and Holly Tashian	1997	
"Heaven with You"	Barry and Holly Tashian	Barry Tashian, Holly Tashian	2:59	Jim Rooney	Ready for Love by Barry and Holly Tashian	1993	
"Ring of Gold"	Barry and Holly Tashian	Barry Tashian, Holly Tashian	2:38	Jim Rooney	Ready for Love by Barry and Holly Tashian	1993	
"Not Me"	Keni Thomas, Vince Gill	Brent Maher, Billy Montana, Keni Thomas	4:02	Brent Maher	Flag of Our Fathers by Keni Thomas	2005	
"Heart Over Mind"	Pam Tillis	Pam Tillis, Mel Tillis	6:12	Pam Tillis	It's All Relative by Pam Tillis	2002	
"Stormy Weather"	Tanya Tucker	Leo Sayer, Tom Snow	3:37		Should I Do It by Tanya Tucker	1981	
"Heartache #3"	Tanya Tucker				Should I Do It by Tanya Tucker	1981	
"Halfway to Heaven"	Tanya Tucker				Should I Do It by Tanya Tucker	1981	
"Jozie Bleu"	Jared Tyler	Jared Tyler, Michael Garrett	3:43	Russ Titelman, Monty Byrom, Michael Garrett	Blue Alleluia by Jared Tyler	2005	
"If I Needed You"	Townes Van Zandt	Townes Van Zandt	3:29	Kevin Eggers	Texas Rain by Townes Van Zandt	2001	
"Resplendent"	Vigilantes of Love	Bill Mallonee	5:03	Emmylou Harris, Buddy Miller	Audible Sigh by The Vigilantes of Love	1999	
"Wild Wolf Calling Me"	Tony Joe White	Tony Joe White, Leann White	4:08	Tony Joe White, Jody White	The Heroines by Tony Joe White	2004	
"Here is Where the Loving is at"	The War and Treaty	Michael Trotter Jr.	4:20	Buddy Miller	Healing Tide	2018	
"Fair and Tender Ladies"	The Whites	Maybelle Carter	3:22	Jerry Douglas	A Lifetime in the Making by The Whites	2000	
"Would These Arms Be in Your Way"	Keith Whitley	Hank Cochran, Vern Gosdin, Red Lane	3:10	Keith Whitley, Garth Fundis, Blake Mevis	Don't Close Your Eyes by Keith Whitley	1988	
"If I Needed You"	Don Williams	Townes Van Zandt	3:35		Especially for You by Don Williams	1981	
"Greenville"	Lucinda Williams	Lucinda Williams	3:23	Lucinda Williams, Roy Bittan	Car Wheels on a Gravel Road by Lucinda Williams	1998	
"Nothing But a Breeze"	Jesse Winchester, Herb Pedersen	Jesse Winchester	4:34	Brian Ahern	Nothing But a Breeze by Jesse Winchester	1977	
"I'm the Train"	Bob Woodruff	Bob Woodruff	4:55	Steve Fishell	Dreams and Saturday Nights by Bob Woodruff	1994	
"High Lonesome"	The Woodys	Gretchen Peters	3:28	Brian Ahern	The Woodys by The Woodys	1998	
"Beneath a Painted Sky"	Tammy Wynette	Joe Chambers, Bucky Jones	2:57	Steve Buckingham	Higher Ground by Tammy Wynette	1987	
"Woman Walk the Line"	Trisha Yearwood	Emmylou Harris, Paul Kennerley	4:31	Garth Fundis	Hearts in Armor by Trisha Yearwood	1992	
"Too Bad You're No Good"	Trisha Yearwood	Paul Craft, Cadillac Holmes	3:50	Garth Fundis, Trisha Yearwood	Real Live Woman by Trisha Yearwood	2000	
"Star of Bethlehem"	Neil Young	Neil Young	2:43	Neil Young, David Briggs	American Stars 'n Bars by Neil Young	1977	
"Red Sun"	Neil Young	Neil Young	2:48	Ben Keith, Neil Young	Silver & Gold by Neil Young	2000	
"No Wonder"	Neil Young		5:45	Neil Young, Ben Keith	Prairie Wind by Neil Young	2005	
"Far from Home"	Neil Young		3:47	Neil Young, Ben Keith	Prairie Wind by Neil Young	2005	
"This Old Guitar"	Neil Young	Neil Young	5:32	Neil Young, Ben Keith	Prairie Wind by Neil Young	2005	
"Scrapbook"	Warren Zanes	Warren Zanes	4:25	Angelo, Warren Zanes	Memory Girls by Warren Zanes	2002	
"Please Stay"	Warren Zevon	Warren Zevon	3:34	Warren Zevon, Jorge Calderon, Noah Scott Snyder	The Wind by Warren Zevon	2003	

^{E} No detailed track information is available for this album.
^{F} Harris plays guitar but does not sing on this track.
