= Emmylou Harris collaborations G–K =

This article represents all appearances that Emmylou Harris has contributed to, in collaboration with artists from G to K.

== Other sections ==
- Solo contributions
- Collaborations A–F
- Collaborations L–Q
- Collaborations R–Z

| Title | Collaborator(s) | Songwriter | Length | Producer | Source | Date | Notes |
|---|---|---|---|---|---|---|---|
| "Oh Carolina" | Vince Gill | Randy Allbright, Jim Elliot, Mark Sanders | 3:17 | Emory Gordy | Turn Me Loose by Vince Gill | 1984 | |
| "Rita Ballou" | Vince Gill | Guy Clark | 3:12 | Tony Brown | When I Call Your Name by Vince Gill | 1989 | |
| "Young Man's Town" | Vince Gill | Vince Gill | 4:33 | Vince Gill | Next Big Thing by Vince Gill | 2003 | |
| "Some Things Never Get Old" | Vince Gill | Vince Gill, Tia Sillers, Al Anderson | 4:11 | Vince Gill, John Hobbs, Justin Niebank | These Days by Vince Gill | 2006 | |
| "Fourteen Days" | Steve Goodman | Steve Goodman | 4:22 | Steve Goodman | Santa Ana Winds by Steve Goodman | 1984 | |
| "Love Me Right to the End" | Vern Gosdin | Max D. Barnes, Vern Gosdin | 3:51 | Blake Mevis | There Is a Season by Vern Gosdin | 1984 | |
| "Long Ride Home" | Patty Griffin | Patty Griffin | 3:33 | Patty Griffin, Doug Lancio, Giles Reaves | 1000 Kisses by Patty Griffin | 2002 | |
| "Mary" | Patty Griffin | Patty Griffin | 5:16 | Jay Joyce | Flaming Red by Patty Griffin | 1998 | |
| "Trapeze" | Patty Griffin | | 4:23 | Patty Griffin, Mike McCarthy | Children Running Through by Patty Griffin | 2007 | |
| "Beyond the Blue" | Patty Griffin | Beth Nielsen Chapman, Gary Nicholson | 4:34 | Buddy Miller, Steve Fishell | Where the Heart Is (Original Soundtrack) by various artists | 2000 | |
| "Fragile" | Nanci Griffith, Holly Tashian, Pam Rose | Nanci Griffith | 3:26 | Peter Buck, Peter Collins | Flyer by Nanci Griffith | 1994 | |
| "Across the Great Divide" | Nanci Griffith | Kate Wolf | 3:57 | Jim Rooney | Other Voices, Other Rooms by Nanci Griffith | 1993 | |
| "Wasn't That a Mighty Storm" | Nanci Griffith | traditional | 5:01 | Nanci Griffith, Don Gehman | Other Voices Too (A Trip Back to Bountiful) by Nanci Griffith | 1998 | |
| "Good Night, New York" | Nanci Griffith | Julie Gold | 5:05 | Nanci Griffith, Monty Hitchcock | Winter Marquee by Nanci Griffith | 2002 | |
| "If I Were a Carpenter" | Johnny Hallyday | Tim Hardin | 2:49 | | Nashville en direct by Johnny Hallyday | 1984 | |
| "Today" | Jamie Hartford, Ronnie McCoury | John Hartford | 3:44 | | Part of Your History: The Songs of John Hartford by various artists | 2005 | |
| "Farther Along" | Hayseed | traditional | 4:59 | | In Other Words... by Hayseed | 2004 | |
| "L.A. Freeway" | Bill and Bonnie Hearne | Guy Clark | 4:40 | John Wooler, Randy Jacobs | Watching Life Through a Windshield by Bill and Bonnie Hearne | 2000 | |
| "L.A. Freeway" | Bill and Bonnie Hearne | Guy Clark | 4:41 | John Wooler, Randy Jacobs | The I-10 Chronicles by various artists | 2000 | |
| "Heaven Ain't Ready For You Yet" | Levon Helm, Albert Lee, Paul Kennerley | Paul Kennerley | 3:56 | Glyn Johns | The Legend of Jesse James by various artists | 1980 | |
| "Wish We Were Back In Missouri" | Levon Helm, Albert Lee | Guy Humphreys, Paul Kennerley | 4:03 | Glyn Johns | The Legend of Jesse James by various artists | 1980 | |
| "One More Shot" | Levon Helm | Paul Kennerley | 5:11 | Glyn Johns | The Legend of Jesse James by various artists | 1980 | |
| "In Your Mercy" | Malcolm Holcombe | Malcolm Holcombe | 4:26 | Ray Kennedy | Down The River | 2012 | |
| "In My Time" | John Jarvis | John Jarvis, Henry | 3:09 | John Jarvis | Pure Contours by John Jarvis | 1984 | |
| "Everything Has a Cost" | Jason & the Scorchers | Perry Baggs, Jason Ringenberg | 4:30 | Warner Hodges, Jeff Johnson | Clear Impetuous Morning by Jason & the Scorchers | 1996 | |
| "Spanish Johnny" | Waylon Jennings | Paul Siebel | 3:50 | | Waylon & Company by Waylon Jennings | 1983 | |
| "Flower in the Desert" | Jim and Jesse | Bill C. Graham, Carl Jackson, Buddy Landon | 3:07 | Carl Jackson | Music Among Friends by Jim and Jesse | 1991 | |
| "West Texas Waltz" | Flaco Jimenez | Butch Hancock | 3:33 | Ry Cooder, Bill Halverson | Partners by Flaco Jimenez | 1992 | |
| "Don't Touch Me" | Jamey Johnson | Hank Cochran | 3:16 | Buddy Cannon, Dale Dodson | Living For A Song - Tribute To Hank Cochran | 2012 | |
| "All Fall Down" | George Jones | Harlan Howard, Ron Peterson | 3:18 | Kyle Lehning, Billy Sherrill | Friends in High Places by George Jones | 1991 | |
| "Here We Are" | George Jones | Rodney Crowell | 2:50 | | My Very Special Guests by George Jones | 1979 | |
| "Say It's Not You" | George Jones, Keith Richards | Dallas Frazier | 2:59 | Brian Ahern | The Bradley Barn Sessions by George Jones | 1994 | ^{[F]} |
| "Where Grass Won't Grow" | George Jones, Dolly Parton, Trisha Yearwood | Earl Montgomery | 3:52 | Brian Ahern | The Bradley Barn Sessions by George Jones | 1994 | |
| "The Sweetest Gift" | The Judds | James B. Coats | 3:51 | Brent Maher | Heartland by The Judds | 1987 | |
| "This Dirty Little Town" | Kieran Kane, Lucinda Williams | Kieran Kane | 2:56 | Kieran Kane, Harry Stinson | Dead Reckoning by Kieran Kane | 1995 | |
| "Greener Pastures" | Kieran Kane | Kieran Kane | 2:58 | Kieran Kane, Harry Stinson | Find My Way Home by Kieran Kane | 1993 | |
| "Find My Way Home" | Kieran Kane | Kieran Kane | 4:15 | Kieran Kane, Harry Stinson | Find My Way Home by Kieran Kane | 1993 | |
| "Never Be the Sun" | Dolores Keane | Donagh Long | 3:43 | Andrew Boland | Solid Ground by Dolores Keane | 1993 | |
| "Emigrant Eyes" | Dolores Keane | Guy Clarke, Stannah | 4:15 | Andrew Boland | Solid Ground by Dolores Keane | 1993 | |
| "My Baby's Gone" | The Kendalls | Hazel Houser | 3:27 | | Movin' Train by The Kendalls | 1983 | |
| "Precious Love" | The Kendalls | | | | Movin' Train by The Kendalls | 1983 | |
| "Wildflower" | The Kendalls | | | | Movin' Train by The Kendalls | 1983 | |
| "Dar Glasgow" | Cheri Knight | Cheri Knight | 4:38 | Twangtrust | The Northeast Kingdom by Cheri Knight | 1998 | |
| "Crawling" | Cheri Knight | Cheri Knight | 4:01 | Twangtrust | The Northeast Kingdom by Cheri Knight | 1998 | |
| "Lost on the River" | Mark Knopfler | Hank Williams | 3:03 | Mark Knopfler | Timeless: A Tribute to Hank Williams by various artists | 2001 | |
| "Alone and Forsaken" | Mark Knopfler | Hank Williams | 3:32 | Mark Knopfler | Timeless: A Tribute to Hank Williams by various artists | 2001 | |
| "Julie's House" | Leo Kottke | Leo Kottke | 3:24 | T-Bone Burnett | Time Step by Leo Kottke | 1983 | |
| "Running All Night Long" | Leo Kottke | Leo Kottke | 2:44 | T-Bone Burnett | Time Step by Leo Kottke | 1983 | |
| "Didn't Leave Nobody But the Baby" | Alison Krauss, Gillian Welch | Alan Lomax, T-Bone Burnett, Gillian Welch (arr.) | 1:57 | T-Bone Burnett | O Brother, Where Art Thou? by various artists | 2000 | ^{[C]} |
| "The Pilgrim: Chapter 33" | Kris Kristofferson, Sam Bush, Jon Randall, Byron House, Randy Scruggs | Kris Kristofferson | 3:51 | Randy Scruggs | The Pilgrim: A Celebration of Kris Kristofferson by various artists | 2006 | |

^{C} Harris performs the bass part, while Welch, who has the lowest register voice of the trio, was given the soprano part.
^{F} Harris plays guitar but does not sing on this track.
