= Emmylou Harris collaborations A–F =

This article represents all appearances that Emmylou Harris has contributed to, in collaboration with artists from A to F.

== Other sections ==
- Solo contributions
- Collaborations G–K
- Collaborations L–Q
- Collaborations R–Z

Title	Collaborator(s)	Songwriter	Length	Producer	Source	Date	Notes
"Blue Eyes Crying in the Rain"	Roy Acuff	Fred Rose	2:05	Ken Ehrlich	Grammy's Greatest Country, Vol. 2 by various artists	1994	^{[B]}
"Oh My Sweet Carolina"	Ryan Adams	Ryan Adams	4:55	Ethan Jones	Heartbreaker by Ryan Adams	2000	
"Coming Of The Knight"	Admiral Freebee	Tom Van Laere	3:44	Malcolm Burn	Wild Dreams Of New Beginnings by Admiral Freebee	2006	
"The Waltz You Saved for Me"	John Anderson	Emil Flindt, Gus Kahn, Wayne King	2:45	John Anderson, Frank Jones	Wild & Blue by John Anderson	1982	
"The Wayward Wind"	Lynn Anderson	Stanley Lebowsky, Herb Newman	3:26	Ralph Jungheim	Cowboy's Sweetheart by Lynn Anderson	1992	
"The Last Time (Geh Nicht Allein)"	Tom Astor	Emmylou Harris, Kieran Kane, Tom Astor	2:34	Tom Astor, Klaus Löhmer	Meilensteine (Milestones) by Tom Astor	1995	
"Dreaming My Dreams"	Mike Auldridge	Allen Reynolds	3:01	Jim McGuire	Mike Auldridge by Mike Auldridge	1976	
"Evangeline"	The Band	Robbie Robertson	3:17	Robbie Robertson	The Last Waltz by the Band	1978	ST
"Sin City"	Beck	Chris Hillman, Gram Parsons	4:01	Emmylou Harris, Paul Kremen	Return of the Grievous Angel: A Tribute to Gram Parsons by various artists	1999	
"Coyote Song"	Delia Bell, Carl Jackson	Ray Park	2:35	Emmylou Harris	Delia Bell by Delia Bell	1983	
"Don't Cheat in Our Hometown"	Delia Bell, Carl Jackson	Ray Pennington, Roy Marcum	2:31	Emmylou Harris	Delia Bell by Delia Bell	1983	
"I Forgot More (Than You'll Ever About Him)"	Delia Bell, Holly Tashian	Cecil Null	3:23	Emmylou Harris	Delia Bell by Delia Bell	1983	
"Back Street Affair	Delia Bell, Holly Tashian	Billy Wallace	2:58	Emmylou Harris	Delia Bell by Delia Bell	1983	
"Wildwood Flower"	Delia Bell, Holly Tashian	A.P. Carter	3:31	Emmylou Harris	Delia Bell by Delia Bell	1983	
"Weary Heart"	Delia Bell, Carl Jackson	Carter Stanley	2:12	Emmylou Harris	Delia Bell by Delia Bell	1983	
"Good Lord A'Mighty"	Delia Bell	Johnny Mullins	2:30	Emmylou Harris	Delia Bell by Delia Bell	1983	
"Lone Pilgrim"	Delia Bell, Carl Jackson	traditional	3:01	Emmylou Harris	Delia Bell by Delia Bell	1983	
"Will You Miss Me"	Delia Bell, Holly Tashian	A.P. Carter	5:02	Emmylou Harris	Delia Bell by Delia Bell	1983	
"Appalachian Rain"	Matraca Berg	Matraca Berg, Ronnie Samoset	3:42	Wendy Waldman, Josh Leo	Lying to the Moon by Matraca Berg	1990	
"Magdalene"	Matraca Berg	Matraca Berg, Holly Gleason	3:44	David Henry, Matraca Berg	Love's Truck Stop	2012	
"Swing Set"	Dan Bern & Common Rotation	Dan Bern	2:57	John Griffin, Adam Busch, Jordan Katz, Dan Bern	Drifter	2012	
"Only a Woman's Heart"	Mary Black	Eleanor McEvoy	3:47	Mary Black, Eleanor McEvoy, Noel Eccles, Declan Sinnott	Looking Back by Mary Black	1995	
"Sonny"	Mary Black, Dolores Keane	Ron Hynes	4:14	Donal Lunny	Bringing It All Back Home, Vol. 1 by various artists	1991	
"Grey Funnel Line"	Mary Black, Dolores Keane	traditional	6:53	Donal Lunny	Bringing It All Back Home, Vol. 2 by various artists	1991	
"We Are Nowhere and It's Now"	Bright Eyes	Conor Oberst	4:11	Mike Mogis	I'm Wide Awake, It's Morning by Bright Eyes	2005	
"Another Travelin' Song"	Bright Eyes	Conor Oberst	4:15	Mike Mogis	I'm Wide Awake, It's Morning by Bright Eyes	2005	
"Landlocked Blues"	Bright Eyes	Conor Oberst	5:46	Mike Mogis	I'm Wide Awake, It's Morning by Bright Eyes	2005	
"Nobody's"	David Bromberg	G. White	4:58	Brian Ahern, Bernie Leadon	Midnight on the Water by David Bromberg	1975	
"Country Girl"	Karen Brooks	Albert Lee/Tony Colton/Ray Smith	3:21	Brian Ahern	Walk On by Karen Brooks	1982	
"New Way Out"	Karen Brooks	Randy Sharp	3:13	Brian Ahern	Walk On by Karen Brooks	1982	
"Shame On The Moon"	Karen Brooks	Rodney Crowell	4:57	Brian Ahern	Walk On by Karen Brooks	1982	
"If That's What You're Thinking"	Karen Brooks	Randy Sharp	3:27	Brian Ahern	Walk On by Karen Brooks	1982	
"Walk On"	Karen Brooks	Karen Brooks	3:22	Brian Ahern	Walk On by Karen Brooks	1982	
"Sweet Believer"	T. Graham Brown	T. Graham Brown, Burch, Vipperman	3:25		You Can't Take It with You by T. Graham Brown	1994	
"Mexican Wind"	Jann Browne	Jann Browne, Pat Gallagher, Roger Stebner	3:53	Steve Fishell	Tell Me Why by Jann Browne	1990	
"Take A Train"	Charles Browning	Charles Browning		Gary Burke	A Choirboy's Lament by Charles Browning	1976	
"Go Tell Aunt Rhody"	Charles Browning	Traditional		Gary Burke	A Choirboys's Lament by Charles Browning	1976	
"Send Me an Angel"	Cindy Bullens	Cindy Bullens	4:35	Cindy Bullens	Neverland by Cindy Bullens	2001	
"We're Gonna Hold On"	Solomon Burke	George Jones, Earl Montgomery	3:28	Buddy Miller	Nashville by Solomon Burke	2006	
"Song For Roy"	Sam Bush	Sam Bush, Jon Randall Stewart	4:03	Sam Bush	"Howlin' At The Moon"	1998	
"The River's Gonna Run"	Sam Bush	Julie Miller	3:59	Sam Bush	"Laps In Seven"	2006	
"Handmics Killed Country Music"	Sam Bush	Sam Bush, Emmylou Harris	3:43	Sam Bush	"Storyman""	2016	
"I'll Be Faithful to You"	Glen Campbell	Paul Kennerley	2:36	Harold Shedd	Letter to Home by Glen Campbell	1984	
"(Love Always) Letter to Home"	Glen Campbell	Carl Jackson	2:58	Harold Shedd	Letter to Home by Glen Campbell	1984	
"You Are"	Glen Campbell	Becky Hobbs, Don London	2:33	Jimmy Bowen, Glen Campell	Still Within the Sound of My Voice by Glen Campbell	1987	
"Visions of Plenty"	Kate Campbell	Kate Campbell, Tricia Walker	4:16	Johnny Pierce	Visions of Plenty by Kate Campbell	1998	
"Crazy in Alabama"	Kate Campbell	Kate Campbell, Kenya Slaughter Walker	4:42	Johnny Pierce	Visions of Plenty by Kate Campbell	1998	
"Alabama Department Of Corrections Meditation Blues"	Kate Campbell	Kate Campbell & Will Kimbrough	4:42	Will Kimbrough	1000 Pound Machine by Kate Campbell	2012	
"Silent Passage"	Bob Carpenter	Bob Carpenter		Brian Ahern	Silent Passage by Bob Carpenter	1984	
"As Long as I Live"	Johnny Cash, Waylon Jennings, Jessi Colter, Roy Acuff	Roy Acuff	2:58	Jack Clement	Water from the Wells of Home by Johnny Cash	1988	
"Sweeter Than the Flowers"	Johnny Cash	Morry Burns, Syd Nathan, Ervin T. Rouse	2:56	Jack Clement	Water from the Wells of Home by Johnny Cash	1988	
Old Rugged Cross	Johnny Cash	George Bennard		Brian Ahern	Producer's Cut	1978 / 2003	
"Hometown Blues"	Rosanne Cash	Tom Petty	2:55	Rodney Crowell	Seven Year Ache by Rosanne Cash	1981	
"This Train Don't Stop There Anymore"	Rosanne Cash	Elton John and Bernie Taupin	5:04	Bernie Taupin	Restoration: Reimagining the Songs of Elton John and Bernie Taupin	2018	
"The Harvest & The Seed"	Kasey Chambers	Kasey Chambers	3:09		Campfire	2018	
"There's a Light"	Beth Nielsen Chapman	Beth Nielsen Chapman	4:25	Beth Nielsen Chapman, Carmen Rizzo, Annie Roboff, Tommy Sims	Deeper Still by Beth Nielsen Chapman	2002	
"I'm a Dreamer"	Marshall Chapman	Marshall Chapman, Sharon Leger	3:42	Michael Utley, Marshall Chapman	Love Slave by Marshall Chapman	1996	
"Better to Let Her Go"	Marshall Chapman	Marshall Chapman	3:51	Michael Utley, Marshall Chapman	Love Slave by Marshall Chapman	1996	
"The Only One"	Tracy Chapman	Tracy Chapman	3:08	Tracy Chapman, David Kershenbaum	Telling Stories by Tracy Chapman	2000	
"Woodrow Wilson"	Vic Chesnutt	Vic Chesnutt	3:51	Vic Chesnutt, Kurt Wagner	The Salesman and Bernadette by Vic Chesnutt	1998	
"Nobody's Darling But Mine"	The Chieftains	Jimmie Davis, Jeanne Pruett	3:37	Paddy Moloney	Another Country by The Chieftains	1992	
"Lambs in the Greenfield"	The Chieftains	traditional	3:19	Paddy Moloney	Further Down the Old Plank Road: The Nashville Sessions by The Chieftains	2003	
Sister Moon	Gene Clark	Gene Clark	5:06	Thomas Jefferson Kaye	Two Sides to Every Story by Gene Clark	1977	
"I Don't Love You Much Do I"	Guy Clark	Guy Clark, Richard Leigh	2:36	Guy Clark, Miles Wilkinson	Boats to Build by Guy Clark	1992	
"Rita Ballou"	Guy Clark	Guy Clark	2:49	Neil Wilburn	Old No. 1 by Guy Clark	1975	
"LA Freeway"	Guy Clark	Guy Clark	4:43	Neil Wilburn	Old No. 1 by Guy Clark	1975	
"She Ain't Goin' Nowhere"	Guy Clark	Guy Clark	3:27	Neil Wilburn	Old No. 1 by Guy Clark	1975	
"That Old Time Feeling"	Guy Clark	Guy Clark	4:10	Neil Wilburn	Old No. 1 by Guy Clark	1975	
"Like a Coat from the Cold"	Guy Clark	Guy Clark	3:18	Neil Wilburn	Old No. 1 by Guy Clark	1975	
"Texas Cookin"	Guy Clark	Guy Clark	3:58	Neil Wilburn	Texas Cookin' by Guy Clark	1976	
"Anyhow, I Love You"	Guy Clark, Rodney Crowell, Waylon Jennings	Guy Clark	3:51	Neil Wilburn	Texas Cookin' by Guy Clark	1976	
"Virginia's Real"	Guy Clark	Guy Clark	2:58	Neil Wilburn	Texas Cookin' by Guy Clark	1976	
"It's About Time"	Guy Clark	Guy Clark	4:57	Neil Wilburn	Texas Cookin' by Guy Clark	1976	
"Good To Love You Lady"	Guy Clark	Guy Clark	5:08	Neil Wilburn	"Texas Cookin'" by Guy Clark	1976	
"Broken Hearted People"	Guy Clark	Guy Clark	4:42	Neil Wilburn	Texas Cookin' by Guy Clark	1976	
"Black Haired Boy"	Guy Clark	Guy Clark, Susanna Clark	3:07	Neil Wilburn	Texas Cookin' by Guy Clark	1976	
"Me I'm Feeling the Same"	Guy Clark	Guy Clark	3:32	Neil Wilburn	Texas Cookin' by Guy Clark	1976	
"Fort Worth Blues"	Guy Clark	Steve Earle	4:31	Guy Clark, Chris Latham, Darrell Scott, Verlon Thompson	Cold Dog Soup by Guy Clark	1999	
"Be Gone Forever"	Guy Clark	Anna McGarrigle/Keith Sykes	3:11	Guy Clark, Chris Latham, Darrell Scott, Verlon Thompson	Cold Dog Soup by Guy Clark	1999	
"Black Diamond Strings"	Guy Clark	Guy Clark	3:49	Guy Clark, Miles Wilkinson	Dublin Blues by Guy Clark	1995	
"Old Friends"	Guy Clark	Guy Clark, Susanna Clark, Richard Dobson	3:12	Guy Clark, Miles Wilkinson	Old Friends by Guy Clark	1989	
"To Live Is to Fly"	Guy Clark	Townes Van Zandt	3:15	Guy Clark, Miles Wilkinson	Old Friends by Guy Clark	1989	
"All Through Throwin' Good Love After Bad"	Guy Clark	Guy Clark, Richard Leigh	2:46	Guy Clark, Miles Wilkinson	Old Friends by Guy Clark	1989	
"Easy from Now on"	Terri Clark	Carlene Carter, Susanna Clark	3:40	Steuart Smith, Terri Clark	Fearless by Terri Clark	2000	
"All Our Dark Tomorrows"	Bruce Cockburn	Bruce Cockburn	6:17	Bruce Cockburn, Colin Linden	You've Never Seen Everything by Bruce Cockburn	2003	
"If I Needed You"	Phil Cody	Townes Van Zandt	3:39	Rami Jafee, Ethan Johns	Big Slow Mover by Phil Cody	2001	
"No Regrets"	Jill Colucci	Jill Colucci, Stewart Harris	4:21	Pamela Rose, Jill Collucci	No Regrets by Jill Colucci	1994	^{[F]}
"Sweet Bed of Feeling"	Priscilla Coolidge-Jones, Booker T. Jones	Donna Weiss, Jackie DeShannon	4:23	Booker T. Jones	Flying by Priscilla Coolidge-Jones	1979	
"Nothing Clings Like Ivy"	Elvis Costello & The Imposters	Elvis Costello	4:17	Dennis Herring, Elvis Costello	The Delivery Man by Elvis Costello & The Imposters	2004	
"Heart Shaped Bruise"	Elvis Costello & The Imposters	Elvis Costello	4:07	Dennis Herring, Elvis Costello	The Delivery Man by Elvis Costello & The Imposters	2004	
"The Scarlet Tide"	Elvis Costello & The Imposters	Elvis Costello, T Bone Burnett	4:57	Dennis Herring, Elvis Costello	The Delivery Man by Elvis Costello & The Imposters	2004	
"The Crooked Line"	Elvis Costello	Elvis Costello, T Bone Burnett	3:49	T Bone Burnett	Secret, Profane & Sugarcane by Elvis Costello	2009	
"Juanita"	Sheryl Crow	Chris Hillman, Gram Parsons	2:42	Emmylou Harris, Paul Kremen	Return of the Grievous Angel: A Tribute to Gram Parsons by various artists	1999	
"Nobody's Perfect"	Sheryl Crow	Sheryl Crow		Sheryl Crow, Jeff Trott	Threads	2019	
"Weather Channel"	Sheryl Crow	Sheryl Crow	4:40	Sheryl Crow, Scott Weiland	C'mon, C'mon by Sheryl Crow	2002	
"Flesh and Blood"	Sheryl Crow, Mary Chapin Carpenter	Johnny Cash	3:44	Marty Stuart	Kindred Spirits: A Tribute to the Songs of Johnny Cash by various artists	2002	
"Crying Holy"	J.D. Crowe & the New South	traditional	2:17		Stained Glass Hour: Bluegrass and Old-Timey Gospel Music by various artists	1992	
"Elvira"	Rodney Crowell	Dallas Frazier	4:26	Brian Ahern	Ain't Living Long Like This by Rodney Crowell	1977	
"Now & Then There's a Fool Such as I"	Rodney Crowell	Bill Trader	3:14	Brian Ahern	Ain't Living Long Like This by Rodney Crowell	1977	
"Leaving Louisiana in the Broad Daylight"	Rodney Crowell	Donivan Cowart, Rodney Crowell	3:26	Brian Ahern	Ain't Living Long Like This by Rodney Crowell	1977	
"Voilà, An American Dream"	Rodney Crowell	Rodney Crowell	3:53	Brian Ahern	Ain't Living Long Like This by Rodney Crowell	1977	
"I Ain't Living Long Like This"	Rodney Crowell	Rodney Crowell	5:04	Brian Ahern	Ain't Living Long Like This by Rodney Crowell	1977	
"Ignorance Is the Enemy"	Rodney Crowell	Rodney Crowell	4:48	Rodney Crowell, Peter Coleman	The Outsider by Rodney Crowell	2005	
"My Baby's Gone"	Rodney Crowell	Hazel Houser	3:31	Carl Jackson	Livin', Lovin', Losin': Songs of the Louvin Brothers by various artists	2003	
"Too Many Tears Too Late"	Bobbie Cryner	Carl Jackson, Jim Weatherly	3:32	Carl Jackson, Doug Johnson	Bobbie Cryner by Bobbie Cryner	1993	
"Disconnection"	Jill Cunniff	Jill Cunniff	3:36	Jill Cunniff	City Beach by Jill Cunniff	2007	
"It's a Lovely, Lovely World"	Gail Davies	Boudleaux Bryant	2:15	Gail Davies	I'll Be There by Gail Davies	1980	
"Why Don't You Love Me"	Bob Delevante	Bob Delevante	3:52		Porchlight by Bob Delevante	1999	
"The Things I Long to Hear"	Bob Delevante	Bob Delevante	3:30	Bob Delevante	Columbus and the Colossal Mistake: A Collections of Songs and Photographs by Bob Delevante	2005	
"Mama's Opry"	Iris DeMent	Iris DeMent	3:25	Jim Rooney	Infamous Angel by Iris DeMent	1992	
"Wild Montana Skies"	John Denver	John Denver	4:02	John Denver, Barney Wyckoff	It's About Time by John Denver	1983	
"Price I Pay"	The Desert Rose Band	Chris Hillman, Bill Wildes	2:58	Paul Worley, Ed Seay	A Dozen Roses – Greatest Hits by The Desert Rose Band	1991	
"Godspeed (Sweet Dreams)"	The Dixie Chicks	Radney Foster	4:42	The Dixie Chicks	Home by The Dixie Chicks	2002	
"Godspeed (Sweet Dreams)"	The Dixie Chicks	Radney Foster	4:41	The Dixie Chicks, Lloyd Maines	Top of the World Tour: Live by The Dixie Chicks	2003	
"Fewer Threads Than These"	Holly Dunn	Bucky Jones, Kevin Welch, Gary Nicholson	2:58		Cornerstone by Holly Dunn	1987	
"Order Coffee"	Dusty Trails	Dusty Trails, Vivian Trimble	3:35	Dusty Trails, Stephen Stills	Dusty Trails by Dusty Trails	2000	
"I Love to Tell the Story"	Robert Duvall	traditional	3:45		The Apostle by various artists	1998	ST
"Mozambique"	Bob Dylan	Bob Dylan, Jacques Levy	3:00	Don DeVito	Desire by Bob Dylan	1976	
"One More Cup of Coffee"	Bob Dylan	Bob Dylan	3:43	Don DeVito	Desire by Bob Dylan	1976	
"Oh Sister"	Bob Dylan	Bob Dylan, Jacques Levy	4:05	Don DeVito	Desire by Bob Dylan	1976	
"Joey"	Bob Dylan	Bob Dylan, Jacques Levy	11:05	Don DeVito	Desire by Bob Dylan	1976	
"Romance in Durango"	Bob Dylan	Bob Dylan, Jacques Levy	5:50	Don DeVito	Desire by Bob Dylan	1976	
"Black Diamond Bay"	Bob Dylan	Bob Dylan, Jacques Levy	7:30	Don DeVito	Desire by Bob Dylan	1976	
"Rita Mae"	Bob Dylan	Bob Dylan, Jacques Levy		Don DeVito	Single	1977	
"Abandoned Love"	Bob Dylan	Bob Dylan	4:29	Jeff Rosen	Biograph by Bob Dylan	1985	
"Golden Loom"	Bob Dylan	Bob Dylan	4:26	Don DeVito	The Bootleg Series, Volumes 1-3 (Rare and Unreleased) 1961-1991 by Bob Dylan	1991	
"Nothin' Without You"	Steve Earle	Steve Earle	3:02	William Alsobrook, Steve Earle	Train a Comin' by Steve Earle	1994	
"Taneytown"	Steve Earle	Steve Earle	5:13	Twangtrust	El Corazón by Steve Earle	1997	
"I Remember You"	Steve Earle	Steve Earle	2:52	Twangtrust	Jerusalem by Steve Earle	2002	
"Comin' Around"	Steve Earle	Steve Earle	3:41	Steve Earle, Ray Kennedy	The Revolution Starts ... Now by Steve Earle	2004	
"How Long"	Jonathan Edwards	Jonathan Edwards	2:20	Brian Ahern	Rockin' Chair by Jonathan Edwards	1976	^{[E]}
"Hearts Overflowing"	Jonathan Edwards	Mike Brewer	3:53	Brian Ahern	Rockin' Chair by Jonathan Edwards	1976	
"Favorite Song"	Jonathan Edwards	Jonathan Edwards	2:36	Brian Ahern	Rockin' Chair by Jonathan Edwards	1976	
"White Line"	Jonathan Edwards	Jonathan Edwards	4:27	Brian Ahern	Rockin' Chair by Jonathan Edwards	1976	
"Ain't Got Time"	Jonathan Edwards	Jonathan Edwards	3:44	Brian Ahern	Rockin' Chair by Jonathan Edwards	1976	
"Hello"	Jonathan Edwards	Jonathan Edwards	2:54	Brian Ahern	Rockin' Chair by Jonathan Edwards	1976	
"Song For The Life"	Jonathan Edwards	Jonathan Edwards	4:56	Brian Ahern	Rockin' Chair by Jonathan Edwards	1976	
"Rockin' Chair (Gonna Get You)"	Jonathan Edwards	Jonathan Edwards	3:24	Brian Ahern	Rockin' Chair by Jonathan Edwards	1976	
"The Christian Life"	Jonathan Edwards	Jonathan Edwards	3:04	Brian Ahern	Rockin' Chair by Jonathan Edwards	1976	
"Blow On Chilly Wind"	Jonathan Edwards	Jesse Winchester	3:16	Brian Ahern	Sailboat by Jonathan Edwards	1977	
"Evangelina"	Jonathan Edwards	Hoyt Axton, Kenneth Higginbotham	3:40	Brian Ahern	Sailboat by Jonathan Edwards	1977	
"Sailboat"	Jonathan Edwards	Jonathan Edwards	3:03	Brian Ahern	Sailboat by Jonathan Edwards	1977	
"How About You"	Jonathan Edwards	Jonathan Edwards	3:24	Brian Ahern	Sailboat by Jonathan Edwards	1977	
"Girl From The Canyon"	Jonathan Edwards	Jonathan Edwards	2:34	Brian Ahern	Sailboat by Jonathan Edwards	1977	
"Weapon Of Prayer"	Jonathan Edwards	Ira & Charlie Louvin	3:23	Brian Ahern	Sailboat by Jonathan Edwards	1977	
"Never Together (But Close Sometimes)"	Jonathan Edwards	Rodney Crowell	2:05	Brian Ahern	Sailboat by Jonathan Edwards	1977	
"Carolina Caroline"	Jonathan Edwards	Jonathan Edwards	3:13	Brian Ahern	Sailboat by Jonathan Edwards	1977	
"Let The Rough Side Drag"	Jonathan Edwards	Jesse Winchester	2:59	Brian Ahern	Sailboat by Jonathan Edwards	1977	
"Mother of Exile"	Jonathan Elias	Jonathan Elias, Emma Lazarus	1:13	Jonathan Elias, John Carter Cash, John Leventhal, Vicenzo LoRusso, Ryan Rehm, Don Was	American River by Jonathan Elias	2004	
"Rex's Blues"	Ramblin' Jack Elliott, Nanci Griffith	Townes Van Zandt	2:36	Roy Rogers	Friends of Mine by Ramblin' Jack Elliott	1998	
"Marathon Kiss"	Marianne Faithfull	Daniel Lanois	4:00	Daniel Lanois, Mark Howard	Vagabond Ways by Marianne Faithfull	1998	
"Tools for the Soul"	Danny Flowers	Danny Flowers, Donnie Wade, James Pennebaker	3:26	James Pennebaker, Danny Flowers	Tools for the Soul by Danny Flowers	2007	
"Prayer Song"	Danny Flowers	Danny Flowers	4:27	James Pennebaker, Danny Flowers	Tools for the Soul by Danny Flowers	2007	
"Only the Heart May Know"	Dan Fogelberg	Dan Fogelberg	4:08	Dan Fogelberg, Marty Lewis	The Innocent Age by Dan Fogelberg	1981	
"Godspeed (Sweet Dreams)"	Radney Foster	Radney Foster	4:54	Mac McAnally, Radney Foster, Darrell Brown	See What You Want to See by Radney Foster	1999	

^{B} Recorded live at 29th annual Grammy award ceremony.
^{E} No detailed track information is available for this album.
^{F} Harris plays guitar but does not sing on this track.
