= Emmylou Harris collaborations L–Q =

This article represents all appearances that Emmylou Harris has contributed to, in collaboration with artists from L to Q.

== Other sections ==
- Solo contributions
- Collaborations A–F
- Collaborations G–K
- Collaborations R–Z

== Collaborations L–Q ==
Title	Collaborator(s)	Songwriter	Length	Producer	Source	Date	Notes
"Amazing Grace" / "Nearer My God to Thee"	Ladysmith Black Mambazo	traditional	3:32	Joseph Shabalala, Martin Walters	Long Walk to Freedom by Ladysmith Black Mambazo	2006	
"I Love You"	Daniel Lanois	Daniel Lanois	4:31		Shine by Daniel Lanois	2003	
"Stormy Sky"	Daniel Lanois, Willie Nelson		2:42		Rockets by Daniel Lanois	2005	
"When You Get a Little Lonely"	Nicolette Larson	Nicolette Larson, Josh Leo, Wendy Waldman	3:33	Tony Brown, Emory Gordy	Say When by Nicolette Larson	1985	
"The King of Broken Hearts"	Jim Lauderdale	J. Lauderdale, Jim Lauderdale	3:01	Rodney Crowell, John Levanthal	Planet of Love by Jim Lauderdale	1991	
"Midnight Will Become Day"	Jim Lauderdale	Jim Lauderdale	2:39	Jim Lauderdale, Tim Coats	The Hummingbirds by Jim Lauderdale	2002	
"High Timberline"	Jim Lauderdale	Robert Hunter, Jim Lauderdale	3:37	Jim Lauderdale, Tim Coats	Headed for the Hills by Jim Lauderdale	2004	
"Detour"	Cyndi Lauper	Paul Westmoreland	2:55	Cyndi Lauper, Tony Brown	Detour by Cyndi Lauper	2016	
"God Ain't Done With Me Yet"	Bernie Leadon	Bernie Leadon	5:07	Ethan Johns	Mirror by Bernie Leadon	2004	
"Backup Plan"	Bernie Leadon	Bernie Leadon	4:22	Ethan Johns	Mirror by Bernie Leadon	2004	
"Country Boy"	Albert Lee	Tony Colton, Albert Lee, Ray Smith	3:46	Brian Ahern	Hiding by Albert Lee	1979	
"Billy Tyler"	Albert Lee	Charles "Chas" Hodges, Dave Peacock	4:45	Brian Ahern	Hiding by Albert Lee	1979	
"On a Real Good Night"	Albert Lee, Ricky Skaggs	Rodney Crowell	4:00	Brian Ahern	Hiding by Albert Lee	1979	
"Rock & Roll Doctor"	Little Feat	Lowell George, Fred Martin	2:57	Lowell George, Van Dyke Parks	Feats Don't Fail Me Now by Little Feat	1974	
"Joy to the World"	Patty Loveless, Jon Randall	traditional	2:12	Emory Gordy, Jr.	Bluegrass and White Snow: A Mountain Christmas by Patty Loveless	2002	
"When Being Who You Are Is Not Enough"	Patty Loveless	Jim Lauderdale, Leslie Satcher	3:16	Emory Gordy, Justin Niebank	Dreamin' My Dreams by Patty Loveless	2005	
"She's Leaving Me Because She Really Wants To"	Lyle Lovett	Lyle Lovett	4:06	George Massenburg, Billy Williams, Lyle Lovett	Joshua Judges Ruth by Lyle Lovett	1992	
"L.A. County"	Lyle Lovett	Lyle Lovett	3:17	Lyle Lovett, Tony Brown, Billy Williams	Pontiac by Lyle Lovett	1987	
"Walk Through the Bottomland"	Lyle Lovett	Lyle Lovett	4:11	Lyle Lovett, Tony Brown, Billy Williams	Pontiac by Lyle Lovett	1987	
"Ladyfingers"	Luscious Jackson	Jill Cunniff	3:27	Jill Cunniff, Gabrielle Glaser, Tony Mangurian, Mickey Petralia, T. Rex, 25 Ton, Tony Visconti, Alex Young	Electric Honey by Lucious Jackson	1999	
"Soothe Yourself"	Luscious Jackson	Jill Cunniff, Vivian Trimble	4:14	Jill Cunniff, Gabrielle Glaser, Daniel Lanois, Luscious Jackson, Tony Mangurian	Fever In, Fever Out by Luscious Jackson	1996	
"Why Do I Lie"	Luscious Jackson	Jill Cunniff	3:19	Jill Cunniff, Gabrielle Glaser, Daniel Lanois, Luscious Jackson, Tony Mangurian	Fever In, Fever Out by Luscious Jackson	1996	
"One Thing"	Luscious Jackson	Luscious Jackson	3:04	Jill Cunniff, Gabrielle Glaser, Daniel Lanois, Luscious Jackson, Tony Mangurian	Fever In, Fever Out by Luscious Jackson	1996	
"What Could Have Been"	Kathy Mattea	Beth Nielsen Chapman	3:45	Kathy Mattea, Dougie MacLean, Allen Reynolds, Jon Vezner	Time Passes By by Kathy Mattea	1990	
"Lone Star Blues"	Delbert McClinton	Delbert McClinton, Gary Nicholson	3:57	Delbert McClinton, Gary Nicholson	Room to Breathe by Delbert McClinton	2002	
"Skip Rope Song"	Kate and Anna McGarrigle	Jesse Winchester	2:34	Joe Boyd	The McGarrigle Hour by Kate and Anna McGarrigle	1998	
"Porte En Arrière"	Kate and Anna McGarrigle	D. L. Menard	3:05	Joe Boyd	The McGarrigle Hour by Kate and Anna McGarrigle	1998	
"Green Green Rocky Road"	Kate and Anna McGarrigle, Loudon Wainwright III	traditional	3:54	Joe Boyd	The McGarrigle Hour by Kate and Anna McGarrigle	1998	
"Angel"	Sarah McLachlan	Sarah McLachlan	5:58		Lilith Fair, Vol 2 by various artists	1999	
"Home"	Midnight Oil	Midnight Oil	4:29	Malcolm Burn	Breathe by Midnight Oil	1996	
"Forever Has Come to an End"	Buddy & Julie Miller	Julie Miller	2:50	Julie Miller	Buddy & Julie Miller by Buddy & Julie Miller	2001	
"A Showman's Life"	Buddy Miller	Jesse Winchester	4:44		Midnight and Lonesome by Buddy Miller	2002	
"Why I'm Walkin'"	Buddy Miller	Melvin Endsley, Stonewall Jackson	5:48	Buddy Miller	The Majestic Silver Strings by Buddy Miller	2011	
"Forever My Beloved"	Julie Miller	Julie Miller	2:25	Julie Miller, Buddy Miller	Blue Pony by Julie Miller	1997	
"Broken Things"	Julie Miller	Julie Miller	3:26		Broken Things by Julie Miller	1999	
"Kentucky Waltz"	Bill Monroe	Bill Monroe	3:09		Bill Monroe & Friends by Bill Monroe	1984	
"'Til I Gain Control Again"	Willie Nelson	Rodney Crowell	5:59	Willie Nelson	Willie and Family Live by Willie Nelson	1978	
"Angel Eyes"	Willie Nelson	Earl Brent, Matt Dennis	2:47	Willie Nelson	Honeysuckle Rose by Willie Nelson and various artists	1980	ST
"I Never Cared for You"	Willie Nelson	Willie Nelson	2:19	Daniel Lanois	Teatro by Willie Nelson.	1998	
"Everywhere I Go"	Willie Nelson	Willie Nelson	2:19	Daniel Lanois	Teatro by Willie Nelson.	1998	
"Darkness on the Face of the Earth"	Willie Nelson	Willie Nelson	2:34	Daniel Lanois	Teatro by Willie Nelson.	1998	
"These Lonely Nights"	Willie Nelson	Chester Odom	3:30	Daniel Lanois	Teatro by Willie Nelson.	1998	
"The Maker"	Willie Nelson	Daniel Lanois	5:09	Daniel Lanois	Teatro by Willie Nelson.	1998	
"I Just Can't Let You Say Goodbye"	Willie Nelson	Willie Nelson	4:39	Daniel Lanois	Teatro by Willie Nelson.	1998	
"I've Just Destroyed the World"	Willie Nelson	Nelson, Price	2:53	Daniel Lanois	Teatro by Willie Nelson.	1998	
"Somebody Pick Up My Pieces"	Willie Nelson	Willie Nelson	4:39	Daniel Lanois	Teatro by Willie Nelson.	1998	
"Three Days"	Willie Nelson	Willie Nelson	3:07	Daniel Lanois	Teatro by Willie Nelson.	1998	
"I've Loved You All Over the World"	Willie Nelson	Willie Nelson	4:18	Daniel Lanois	Teatro by Willie Nelson.	1998	
"Mary Danced with Soldiers"	The Nitty Gritty Dirt Band	Paul Kennerley	2:57	The Nitty Gritty Dirty Band, Randy Scruggs	Will the Circle Be Unbroken: Volume II by The Nitty Gritty Dirt Band	1989	
"Riding Alone"	The Nitty Gritty Dirt Band	Bob Carpenter, Jeff Hanna, Richard Hathaway	2:34	The Nitty Gritty Dirty Band, Randy Scruggs	Will the Circle Be Unbroken: Volume II by The Nitty Gritty Dirt Band	1989	
"Will the Circle Be Unbroken"	The Nitty Gritty Dirt Band	A. P. Carter, Jimmy Ibbotson	5:39	The Nitty Gritty Dirty Band, Randy Scruggs	Will the Circle Be Unbroken: Volume II by The Nitty Gritty Dirt Band	1989	
"I'll Be Faithful to You"	The Nitty Gritty Dirt Band	Paul Kennerley	2:33	The Nitty Gritty Dirt Band, Denise Jarvis, Randy Scruggs	Will the Circle Be Unbroken: Volume III by The Nitty Gritty Dirt Band	2002	
"Oh Cumberland"	The Nitty Gritty Dirt Band, Matraca Berg	Matraca Berg, Gary Harrison	4:22	The Nitty Gritty Dirt Band, Denise Jarvis, Randy Scruggs	Will the Circle Be Unbroken: Volume III by The Nitty Gritty Dirt Band	2002	
"Don't Make Me Break Her Heart"	Jamie O'Hara	Jamie O'Hara	4:22	Jamie O'Hara, Brent Maher	Beautiful Obsession by Jamie O'Hara	2001	
"Mantra"	Jamie O'Hara	Jamie O'Hara	2:59	Jamie O'Hara, Brent Maher	Beautiful Obsession by Jamie O'Hara	2001	
"That Lovin' You Feelin' Again"	Roy Orbison	Roy Orbison, Chris Price	4:09	Brian Ahern	Roadie: Original Soundtrack by various artists	1980	ST
"God Song"	Beth Orton	Beth Orton	5:15	Beth Orton, Victor Van Vugt	Daybreaker by Beth Orton	2002	
"Still Feeling Blue"	Gram Parsons	Gram Parsons	2:40	Gram Parsons, Ric Grech	GP by Gram Parsons	1973	
"We'll Sweep Out the Ashes in the Morning"	Gram Parsons	Joyce Allsup	3:13	Gram Parsons, Ric Grech	GP by Gram Parsons	1973	
"A Song for You"	Gram Parsons	Gram Parsons	4:58	Gram Parsons, Ric Grech	GP by Gram Parsons	1973	
"Streets of Baltimore"	Gram Parsons	Tompall Glaser, Harlan Howard	2:53	Gram Parsons, Ric Grech	GP by Gram Parsons	1973	
"That's All It Took"	Gram Parsons	Darrell Edwards, Charlotte Grier, George Jones	3:38	Gram Parsons, Ric Grech	GP by Gram Parsons	1973	
"The New Soft Shoe"	Gram Parsons	Gram Parsons	3:54	Gram Parsons, Ric Grech	GP by Gram Parsons	1973	
"Kiss the Children"	Gram Parsons	Gram Parsons	2:57	Gram Parsons, Ric Grech	GP by Gram Parsons	1973	
"Cry One More Time"	Gram Parsons	Peter Wolf, Seth Justman	3:38	Gram Parsons, Ric Grech	GP by Gram Parsons	1973	
"How Much I've Lied"	Gram Parsons	Gram Parsons, David Rifkin	2:29	Gram Parsons, Ric Grech	GP by Gram Parsons	1973	
"Big Mouth Blues"	Gram Parsons	Gram Parsons	3:52	Gram Parsons, Ric Grech	GP by Gram Parsons	1973	
"Return of the Grievous Angel"	Gram Parsons	Gram Parsons	4:19	Gram Parsons	Grievous Angel by Gram Parsons	1974	
"Hearts on Fire"	Gram Parsons	Tom Guidera, Walter Egan	3:50	Gram Parsons	Grievous Angel by Gram Parsons	1974	
"I Can't Dance"	Gram Parsons	Tom T. Hall	2:20	Gram Parsons	Grievous Angel by Gram Parsons	1974	
"$1000 Wedding"	Gram Parsons	Tom T. Hall	5:00	Gram Parsons	Grievous Angel by Gram Parsons	1974	
"Cash on the Barrelhead"	Gram Parsons	Charlie Louvin, Ira Louvin	2:12	Gram Parsons	Grievous Angel by Gram Parsons	1974	
"Hickory Wind"	Gram Parsons	Gram Parsons, Bob Buchanan	4:15	Gram Parsons	Grievous Angel by Gram Parsons	1974	
"Love Hurts"	Gram Parsons	Boudleaux Bryant	3:40	Gram Parsons	Grievous Angel by Gram Parsons	1974	
"Ooh Las Vegas"	Gram Parsons	Gram Parsons, Ric Grech	3:29	Gram Parsons	Grievous Angel by Gram Parsons	1974	
"In My Hour of Darkness"	Gram Parsons	Gram Parsons, Emmylou Harris	3:42	Gram Parsons	Grievous Angel by Gram Parsons	1974	
"Brand New Heartache"	Gram Parsons	Felice and Boudleaux Bryant	2:28	Gram Parsons, Jim Dickson	Sleepless Nights by Gram Parsons and the Flying Burrito Brothers	1976	
"Sleepless Nights"	Gram Parsons	Gram Parsons	3:23	Gram Parsons, Jim Dickson	Sleepless Nights by Gram Parsons and the Flying Burrito Brothers	1976	
"The Angels Rejoiced Last Night"	Gram Parsons	Charlie Louvin, Ira Louvin	2:23	Gram Parsons, Jim Dickson	Sleepless Nights by Gram Parsons and the Flying Burrito Brothers	1976	
"We'll Sweep Out the Ashes"	Gram Parsons	Joyce Allsup	3:34	John M. Delgatto, Marley Grant	Live 1973 by Gram Parsons & The Fallen Angels	1982	
"Country Baptizing"	Gram Parsons	Traditional	3:50	John M. Delgatto, Marley Grant	Live 1973 by Gram Parsons & The Fallen Angels	1982	
"Drug Store Truck Drivin' Man"	Gram Parsons	Gram Parsons, Roger McGuinn	4:33	John M. Delgatto, Marley Grant	Live 1973 by Gram Parsons & The Fallen Angels	1982	
"Big Mouth Blues"	Gram Parsons	Gram Parsons	4:34	John M. Delgatto, Marley Grant	Live 1973 by Gram Parsons & The Fallen Angels	1982	
The New Soft Shoe	Gram Parsons	Gram Parsons	5:02	John M. Delgatto, Marley Grant	Live 1973 by Gram Parsons & The Fallen Angels	1982	
"Cry One More Time"	Gram Parsons	Peter Wolf, Seth Justman	5:22	John M. Delgatto, Marley Grant	Live 1973 by Gram Parsons & The Fallen Angels	1982	
"Streets of Baltimore"	Gram Parsons	Tompall Glaser, Harlan Howard	3:08	John M. Delgatto, Marley Grant	Live 1973 by Gram Parsons & The Fallen Angels	1982	
"That's All It Took"	Gram Parsons	Darrell Edwards, Charlotte Grier, George Jones	2:45	John M. Delgatto, Marley Grant	Live 1973 by Gram Parsons & The Fallen Angels	1982	
"Love Hurts"	Gram Parsons	Boudleaux Bryant	4:31	John M. Delgatto, Marley Grant	Live 1973 by Gram Parsons & The Fallen Angels	1982	
"California Cottonfields"	Gram Parsons	Dallas Frazier, Earl Montgomery	2:32	John M. Delgatto, Marley Grant	Live 1973 by Gram Parsons & The Fallen Angels	1982	
"Six Days on the Road"	Gram Parsons	Earl Green, Carl Montgomery	3:04	John M. Delgatto, Marley Grant	Live 1973 by Gram Parsons & The Fallen Angels	1982	
Encore Medley (Bony Moronie; Forty Days; Almost Grown)	Gram Parsons	Larry Williams; Chuck Berry; Chuck Berry	5:50	John M. Delgatto, Marley Grant	Live 1973 by Gram Parsons & The Fallen Angels	1982	
"That's All It Took (alternate take)"	Gram Parsons	Darrell Edwards, Charlotte Grier, George Jones	3:02	Emmylou Harris, Rick Grech, Gram Parsons	The Complete Reprise Sessions by Gram Parsons	2006	
"Still Feeling Blue (alternate take)"	Gram Parsons	Gram Parsons	2:40	Emmylou Harris, Rick Grech, Gram Parsons	The Complete Reprise Sessions by Gram Parsons	2006	
"Kiss the Children (alternate take)"	Gram Parsons	Gram Parsons	2:59	Emmylou Harris, Rick Grech, Gram Parsons	The Complete Reprise Sessions by Gram Parsons	2006	
"Streets of Baltimore (alternate take)"	Gram Parsons	Tompall Glaser, Harlan Howard	3:00	Emmylou Harris, Rick Grech, Gram Parsons	The Complete Reprise Sessions by Gram Parsons	2006	
"We'll Sweep Out the Ashes in the Morning (alternate take)"	Gram Parsons	Joyce Allsup	3:18	Emmylou Harris, Rick Grech, Gram Parsons	The Complete Reprise Sessions by Gram Parsons	2006	
"The New Soft Shoe (alternate take)"	Gram Parsons	Gram Parsons	4:05	Emmylou Harris, Rick Grech, Gram Parsons	The Complete Reprise Sessions by Gram Parsons	2006	
"Return of the Grievous Angel (alternate take)"	Gram Parsons	Gram Parsons	4:28	Emmylou Harris, Rick Grech, Gram Parsons	The Complete Reprise Sessions by Gram Parsons	2006	
"In My Hour of Darkness (alternate take)"	Gram Parsons	Gram Parsons, Emmylou Harris	3:46	Emmylou Harris, Rick Grech, Gram Parsons	The Complete Reprise Sessions by Gram Parsons	2006	
"Ooh Las Vegas (alternate take)"	Gram Parsons	Gram Parsons, Ric Grech	3:45	Emmylou Harris, Rick Grech, Gram Parsons	The Complete Reprise Sessions by Gram Parsons	2006	
"I Can't Dance (alternate take)"	Gram Parsons	Tom T. Hall	2:25	Emmylou Harris, Rick Grech, Gram Parsons	The Complete Reprise Sessions by Gram Parsons	2006	
"Love Hurts (alternate take)"	Gram Parsons	Boudleaux Bryant	3:47	Emmylou Harris, Rick Grech, Gram Parsons	The Complete Reprise Sessions by Gram Parsons	2006	
"Hickory Wind (alternate take)"	Gram Parsons	Gram Parsons, Bob Buchanan	4:17	Emmylou Harris, Rick Grech, Gram Parsons	The Complete Reprise Sessions by Gram Parsons	2006	
"Country Road"	Dolly Parton, Patty Loveless	Dolly Parton, Gary Scruggs	3:27	Steve Buckingham	Eagle When She Flies by Dolly Parton	1991	
"Why Can't We"	Dolly Parton, Michael English, Chuck Cannon	Allen Shamblin, Austin Cunningham and Chuck Cannon	3:48	Steve Buckingham and Dolly Parton	Slow Dancing with the Moon by Dolly Parton	1993	
"Somebody's Missing You"	Dolly Parton, Alison Krauss	Dolly Parton	3:43	Kent Wells and Dolly Parton	Better Day (album) by Dolly Parton	2011	
"On the Sea of Galilee"	The Peasall Sisters	A.P. Carter	3:16	John Carter Cash, Jim DeMain	The Unbroken Circle: The Musical Heritage of the Carter Family by various artists	2004	
"Our Baby's Gone"	Herb Pedersen, Linda Ronstadt	Herb Pedersen	2:47	Mike Post	Southwest by Herb Pedersen	1976	
"For the Love of It All"	Peter, Paul and Mary	Noel Paul Stookey	4:50	Phil Ramone	LifeLines by Peter, Paul and Mary	1995	
"River of Jordan"	Peter, Paul and Mary, Ronnie Gilbert, Fred Hellerman, Pete Seeger, B.B. King, John Sebastian, Holly Near, Tom Paxton, Dave Van Ronk	Peter Yarrow	5:26	Phil Ramone	LifeLines by Peter, Paul and Mary	1995	
"I Ain't Ever Satisfied"	Gretchen Peters, Steve Earle	Steve Earle	3:50	Green Daniel	The Secret of Life by Gretchen Peters	1996	
"Streets of this Town (Ode to Fernwood)"	Mary Kay Place, Anne Murray, Albert Lee	Paul Grady	2:58	Brian Ahern	Tonite! At the Capri Lounge Loretta Haggers by Mary Kay Place	1976	
"Baby Boy"	Mary Kay Place, Anne Murray, Albert Lee	Mary Kay Place	3:02	Brian Ahern	Tonite! At the Capri Lounge Loretta Haggers by Mary Kay Place	1976	
"Settin' The Woods On Fire"	Mary Kay Place	Fred Rose, Ed. G. Nelson	2:41	Brian Ahern	Tonite! At the Capri Lounge Loretta Haggers by Mary Kay Place	1976	
"Get Acquainted Waltz"	Mary Kay Place	Ira Louvin, Charlie Louvin	3:13	Brian Ahern	Tonite! At the Capri Lounge Loretta Haggers by Mary Kay Place	1976	
"Dolly's Dive"	Mary Kay Place, Emory Gordy	Mary Kay Place	2:41	Brian Ahern	Aimin' to Please by Mary Kay Place	1977	^{[E]}
"Don't Make Love (To A Country Music Singer)"	Mary Kay Place	D. Thomas, B. Morrison	3:20	Brian Ahern	Aimin' To Please by Mary Kay Place	1977	
"Marlboro Man"	Mary Kay Place	Mary Kay Place, Emory Gordy	3:37	Brian Ahern	Aimin' To Please by Mary Kay Place	1977	
"Anybody's Darlin' (Anything But Mine)"	Mary Kay Place	Rodney Crowell	5:29	Brian Ahern	Aimin' To Please by Mary Kay Place	1977	
"You Can't Go To Heaven (If You Don't Have A Good Time)"	Mary Kay Place	Rodney Crowell	3:22	Brian Ahern	Aimin' To Please by Mary Kay Place	1977	
"Cattle Kate"	Mary Kay Place	Mary Kay Place, Emory Gordy	3:47	Brian Ahern	Aimin' To Please by Mary Kay Place	1977	
"Even Cowgirls Get The Blues"	Mary Kay Place	Rodney Crowell	3:13	Brian Ahern	Aimin' To Please by Mary Kay Place	1977	
"Save the Last Dance for Me"	Mary Kay Place	Doc Pomus, Mort Shuman	3:06	Brian Ahern	Aimin' To Please by Mary Kay Place	1977	
"She"	The Pretenders	Chris Ethridge, Gram Parsons	4:51	Emmylou Harris, Paul Kremen	Return of the Grievous Angel: A Tribute to Gram Parsons by various artists	1999	
"I Know One"	John Prine	Jack Clement	2:41	John Prine, Jim Rooney, Marty Stuart, Mary Stuart	In Spite of Ourselves by John Prine	1999	
"White Line"	Peter Pringle	Willie P. Bennett	4:50	Brian Ahern	Peter Pringle by Peter Pringle	1976	
"Just Can't Believe It"	Pure Prairie League	Larry Goshorn, Mike Reilly	2:21	John Boylan	Two Lane Highway by Pure Prairie League	1975	

^{E} No detailed track information is available for this album.
