= These Days (Vince Gill album) =

Studio album by Vince Gill
- Released: October 17, 2006
- Recorded: September 2005–2006
- Studio: Blackbird Studio (Berry Hill, Tennessee); Emerald Sound Studios, Masterfonics, Ocean Way Nashville, Sound Kitchen and The Sound House (Nashville, Tennessee)
- Genre: Country
- Length: 2:44:37
- Label: MCA Nashville
- Producer: Vince Gill John Hobbs Justin Niebank

Vince Gill chronology
Next Big Thing (2003)	These Days (2006)	Icon (2010)

Professional ratings
Aggregate scores
Source	Rating
Metacritic	82/100
Review scores
Source	Rating
About.com	5/5 stars
AllMusic	5/5 stars
The Austin Chronicle	3/5 stars
Billboard	(favorable)
Entertainment Weekly	A−
Hartford Courant	(favorable)
The New York Times	(positive)
PopMatters	7/10 stars

These Days is the eleventh studio album and the first box set by American country music artist Vince Gill. Consisting of 43 original songs spanning four discs, the album displays the range of Gill's lyrical and musical styles, ranging from traditional country and bluegrass to jazz and rock. The album was nominated for two Grammy Awards including Album of the Year and won Best Country Album. In 2012, the album was number 10 on People Magazine's "Top 10 Best Albums of the Century (So Far)". It is also ranked number 9 on Country Universe's "The 100 Greatest Albums of the Decade."

== History ==
To accompany him on this undertaking, Gill turned both to artists he knew and had worked with before and to those whose music he admired from a distance. "I never try to fill up my records with famous people," Gill says. "I try to fill them up with the most talented people I can find on the face of the earth." By the time the project was completed, that group included: Sheryl Crow, Bonnie Raitt, Diana Krall, Rodney Crowell, Patty Loveless, Phil Everly, the Del McCoury Band, Alison Krauss, Emmylou Harris, John Anderson, Lee Ann Womack, Jenny Gill, Amy Grant, LeAnn Rimes, Gretchen Wilson, Guy Clark, Trisha Yearwood, Bekka Bramlett, Michael McDonald, steel-guitarist Buddy Emmons and many other musical standouts.

Initially, Gill planned to pare down the songs to a single album. Then, in one of the studios he used, he spotted some Beatles memorabilia and recalled that the Fab Four had routinely released multiple albums within the same year.

The album debuted on the U.S. Billboard 200 at number 17, with 42,000 copies sold in its first week. This was also the album's peak position on the chart.

== Singles ==
Three singles were released from this album, of which two were duets. The first single, "The Reason Why" (featuring Alison Krauss) reached number 28 on the Hot Country Songs charts; following it was "What You Give Away", which featured Sheryl Crow and peaked at number 43. The third single, "How Lonely Looks", failed to chart.

== Track listing ==
=== Workin' on a Big Chill ===
"The Rockin' Record"

1. "Workin’ on a Big Chill" (Gill, Al Anderson, Leslie Satcher) - 4:03
2. "Love’s Standin’" (Gill, Joe Henry, John Hobbs) - 4:05
3. "Cowboy Up" (featuring Gretchen Wilson) (Gill, Pete Wasner) - 4:00
4. "Sweet Thing" (Gill, Gary Nicholson) - 3:20
5. "Bet It All on You" (Gill, A. Anderson) - 4:26
6. "Nothin’ for a Broken Heart" (Duet w/Rodney Crowell) (Gill, A. Anderson) - 3:03
7. "Son of a Ramblin’ Man" (featuring Del McCoury Band) (Gill, A. Anderson) - 2:45
8. "Smilin’ Song" (featuring Michael McDonald) (Gill) - 2:59
9. "The Rhythm of the Pourin’ Rain" (featuring Bekka Bramlett) (Gill, Wasner) - 3:26
10. "Nothin’ Left to Say" (Gill, Billy Thomas) - 3:56

=== The Reason Why ===
"The Groovy Record"

1. "What You Don't Say" (with LeAnn Rimes) (Gill, Hobbs, Reed Nielsen) - 5:03
2. "The Reason Why" (with Alison Krauss) (Gill, Nicholson) - 2:50
3. "The Rock of Your Love" (with Bonnie Raitt) (Gill, A. Anderson, Satcher) - 3:51
4. "What You Give Away" (with Sheryl Crow) (Gill, A. Anderson) - 4:52
5. "Faint of Heart" (with Diana Krall) (Gill, A. Anderson) - 4:30
6. "Time to Carry On" (with Jenny Gill) (Gill, Wasner) - 4:09
7. "No Easy Way" (Gill, Nielsen) - 3:40
8. "This Memory of You" (with Trisha Yearwood) (Gill, A. Anderson, Hobbs) - 3:43
9. "How Lonely Looks" (Gill, Beverly W. Darnell) - 5:10
10. "Tell Me One More Time About Jesus" (with Amy Grant) (Gill, Grant) - 4:02
11. "Everything and Nothing" (with Katrina Elam) (Gill, Darnell, Kyle D. Matthews) - 4:02
12. "Which Way Will You Go" (Gill, Hobbs, Nielsen) - 4:11
13. "These Days" (Gill) - 3:55

=== Some Things Never Get Old ===
"The Country and Western Record"

1. "This New Heartache" (Gill) - 3:31
2. "The Only Love" (Gill, Nielsen) - 3:53
3. "Out of My Mind" (featuring Patty Loveless) (Gill, A. Anderson, Satcher) - 3:18
4. "The Sight of Me Without You" (Gill, A. Anderson, Hobbs) - 4:07
5. "I Can’t Let Go" (featuring Alison Krauss & Dan Tyminski) (Gill) - 3:28
6. "Don’t Pretend with Me" (Gill, A. Anderson, Satcher) - 2:32
7. "Some Things Never Get Old" (featuring Emmylou Harris) (Gill, A. Anderson, Tia Sillers) - 4:11
8. "Sweet Little Corrina" (featuring Phil Everly) (Gill, A. Anderson) - 2:52
9. "If I Can Make Mississippi" (featuring Lee Ann Womack) (Gill) - 3:44
10. "Take This Country Back" (Duet w/John Anderson) (Gill) - 3:37

=== Little Brother ===
"The Acoustic Record"

1. "All Prayed Up" (Gill) - 2:16
2. "Cold Gray Light of Gone" (featuring The Del McCoury Band) (Gill, Bill Anderson, Otto Kitsinger) - 4:03
3. "A River Like You" (featuring Jenny Gill) (Gill, Randy Albright, Mark D. Sanders) - 4:50
4. "Ace Up Your Pretty Sleeve" (Gill, Mark Germino) - 3:33
5. "Molly Brown" (Gill, Jim Waggoner) - 4:19
6. "Girl" (Guest Vocalist: Rebecca Lynn Howard) (Gill) - 4:30
7. "Give Me the Highway" (featuring The Del McCoury Band) (Gill) - 3:14
8. "Sweet Augusta Darlin’" (Gill) - 3:12
9. "Little Brother" (Gill) - 4:46
10. "Almost Home" (Duet w/Guy Clark) (Gill) - 5:19

== Personnel ==
Musicians

- Vince Gill – lead vocals, backing vocals, harmony vocals, electric guitar solos (1–33), acoustic guitar (1, 7, 9, 10, 14, 16–18, 21, 23–30, 32, 35–37, 39–43), electric guitar (1–9, 11, 13–22, 24, 31, 33), acoustic guitar solos (21–23, 34–43), mandolin (22, 34, 36, 41), "take-off" guitar (24–33), baritone vocals (34, 41), resonator guitar (38), 12-string guitar (43)
- John Hobbs – acoustic piano (1, 2, 4–6, 8, 10–14, 16–33, 37, 38, 43), Wurlitzer electric piano (1, 2, 4–6, 8, 10–14, 16–33, 37, 38, 43), Hammond B3 organ (1, 2, 4–6, 8, 10–14, 16–33, 37, 38, 43), Fender Rhodes (11–23)
- Pete Wasner – Wurlitzer electric piano (1–9, 11–14, 16–20, 27, 30), Hammond B3 organ (1–9, 11–14, 16–20, 27, 30), synthesizers (11–14, 16–20, 27, 30)
- Diana Krall – acoustic piano (15)
- Jim Cox – Hammond B3 organ (21)
- Richard Bennett – acoustic guitar (1–6, 8, 9, 11–14, 16–33), archtop guitar (1–6, 8, 9, 11–14, 16–33), electric guitar (1–6, 8, 9, 11–14, 16–33)
- Tom Bukovac – electric guitar (1, 2, 5, 6, 7, 14, 16–22)
- Al Anderson – acoustic guitar (2, 3, 5–8, 11–13, 20, 21, 31), electric guitar (2, 3, 5–8, 11–13, 20, 21, 31)
- Steuart Smith – electric guitar (3, 4, 9, 11, 13, 30–32)
- Del McCoury – acoustic guitar (7, 35, 40)
- Tom Britt – acoustic guitar (9, 10, 38, 43), electric guitar (9, 10, 38, 43), gut string guitar (9, 10, 38, 43), slide guitar (9, 10, 38, 43)
- Billy Joe Walker Jr. – electric guitar (24–26, 28, 29, 33)
- Jeff White – acoustic guitar (34, 36, 39, 41), acoustic baritone guitar (42)
- Paul Franklin – dobro (3, 4, 6, 9, 11, 13, 16, 20, 30–32), steel guitar (3, 4, 6, 9, 11, 13, 16, 20, 30–32)
- John Hughey – steel guitar (12, 13)
- Buddy Emmons – steel guitar (24–26, 28, 29, 33)
- Jerry Douglas – dobro (36, 39)
- Rob McCoury – banjo (7, 35, 40)
- Charlie Cushman – banjo (34, 39, 41)
- Ronnie McCoury – mandolin (7, 35, 39, 40)
- Michael Rhodes – bass guitar (1–33, 36–38, 43), upright bass (1–33, 36–38, 43)
- Mike Bub – upright bass (34, 39, 41)
- Alan Bartram – upright bass (35, 40)
- Chad Cromwell – drums (1–9, 11–13, 27, 30–32, 37), tambourine (1–10)
- Billy Thomas –drums (10, 38, 43)
- Eddie Bayers – drums (24–26, 28, 29, 33)
- Eric Darken – percussion (1–33), tambourine (1–33), bells (11–23), chimes (11–23), vibraphone (11–23)
- Jim Horn – horns (2, 4, 6, 8), horn arrangements (2, 4, 6, 8)
- Doug Moffet – baritone saxophone (5)
- Mark Douthit – tenor saxophone (5)
- Barry Green – trombone (5)
- Jeff Bailey – trumpet (5)
- Mike Haynes – trumpet (5)
- Michael Omartian – horn arrangements (5)
- Jason Carter – fiddle (7, 35, 40)
- Stuart Duncan – fiddle (24–33)
- Michael Cleveland – fiddle (34, 36, 39, 41)
- Jim Hoke – harmonica (37, 38)
- The Nashville String Machine – strings (11, 16, 18, 21)
- David Campbell – string arrangements (11, 16, 18, 21)
- Carl Gorodetzky – concertmaster (11, 16, 18, 21)

Vocalists

- Bekka Bramlett – backing vocals (1, 2), harmony vocals (5), vocals (9)
- Gene Miller – backing vocals (1, 2), harmony vocals (19, 43)
- Will Owsley – backing vocals (1), harmony vocals (43)
- Gretchen Wilson – vocals (3)
- Billy Thomas – harmony vocals (4, 10, 19)
- Jenny Gill – harmony vocals (5), vocals (16, 36)
- Rodney Crowell – vocals (6)
- Del McCoury – backing vocals (7), tenor vocals (35, 40)
- Michael McDonald – vocals (8)
- LeAnn Rimes – vocals (11)
- Alison Krauss – vocals (12, 28)
- Bonnie Raitt – vocals (13)
- Sheryl Crow – vocals (14)
- Diana Krall – vocals (15)
- Lisa Cochran – backing vocals (17)
- Jeff White – backing vocals (17), harmony vocals (22, 34), tenor vocals (34)
- Trisha Yearwood – vocals (18)
- Amy Grant – vocals (20)
- Katrina Elam – vocals (21)
- Dawn Sears – harmony vocals (24, 26)
- Liana Manis – harmony vocals (25)
- Jon Randall – harmony vocals (25)
- Patty Loveless – vocals (26)
- Andrea Zonn – vocals (27)
- Wes Hightower – harmony vocals (27, 32)
- Dan Tyminski – vocals (28)
- Leslie Satcher – harmony vocals (29)
- Emmylou Harris – vocals (30)
- Phil Everly – vocals (31)
- Lee Ann Womack – vocals (32)
- John Anderson – vocals (33)
- Rebecca Lynn Howard – vocals (39)
- Sonya Isaacs – tenor vocals (41)
- Guy Clark – vocals (43)
- Kim Keyes – harmony vocals (43)

Choirs

- Audrelle Brown, Keisha Frierson, Chaerea Denning, Calvin Nowell, Desmond Pringle, Logan Reynolds, Drea Rhenee, David Ridley, Julie Scalise and Leah White – choir (14, 20)
- Benny Garcia, Vince Gill, John Hobbs and Justin Niebank – "frozen margarita" choir (29)

== Production ==
- Vince Gill – producer
- John Hobbs – producer
- Justin Niebank – producer
- Traci Sterling Bishir – production manager
- Craig Allen – art direction, design
- William Matthews – art direction, design, cover painting
- Jim "Señor" McGuire – photography
- Deborah Wingo – hair
- Jan Reams – make-up
- Trish Townsend – wardrobe stylist
- Terry Elam, Larry Fitzgerald and Mark Hartley for The Fitzgerald/Hartley Co. – management

Technical credits

- Adam Ayan – mastering at Gateway Mastering (Portland, Maine)

CDs 1–3

- Justin Niebank – recording, mixing
- Terry Christian – horn recording (5)
- Drew Bollman – recording assistant, mix assistant, additional recording, assistant engineer
- Neal Cappellino – additional recording
- Steve Marcantonio – additional recording
- Scott Kidd – assistant engineer
- Greg Lawrence – assistant engineer
- David Robinson – assistant engineer

CD 4

- Neal Cappellino – recording, mixing
- Scott Kidd – recording assistant, mix assistant
- Greg Lawrence – recording assistant, mix assistant

== Chart performance ==
=== Weekly charts ===
Chart (2006)	Peak position
US Billboard 200	17
US Top Country Albums (Billboard)	4

=== Year-end charts ===
Chart (2007)	Position
US Top Country Albums (Billboard)	50

== Certifications ==
Region	Certification	Certified units/sales
United States (RIAA)	Platinum	1,000,000^{^}
^{^} Shipments figures based on certification alone.
