= Next Big Thing =

Studio album by Vince Gill
- Released: February 11, 2003
- Recorded: 2002
- Studios: Ocean Way Nashville, Seventeen Grand Recording and East Iris Studios (Nashville, Tennessee); Sound Kitchen (Franklin, Tennessee)
- Genre: Country
- Length: 1:04:13
- Label: MCA Nashville
- Producer: Vince Gill

Vince Gill chronology
| Tis the Season (2000) | Next Big Thing (2003) | These Days (2006) |

Singles from Next Big Thing
- 1. "Next Big Thing" Released: November 2002; 2. "Someday" Released: March 29, 2003

Professional ratings
Aggregate scores
| Source | Rating |
|---|---|
| Metacritic | 80/100 |
Review scores
| Source | Rating |
| AllMusic | 4/5 stars |
| Billboard | (favorable) |
| Country Weekly | (favorable) |
| Entertainment Weekly | A− |
| Q | 3/5 stars |
| USA Today | 4/4 stars |

Next Big Thing is the tenth studio album from American country music artist Vince Gill. It was released in 2003 on MCA Nashville, and it features four singles: the title track, "Someday", "Young Man's Town", and "In These Last Few Days". These respectively reached #17, #31, #44 and #51 on the Billboard Hot Country Songs charts in 2003.

== Track listing ==
All tracks are written by Vince Gill, with additional co-writers as noted.

| No. | Title | Writer(s) | Length |
|---|---|---|---|
| 1. | "Next Big Thing" | Al Anderson; John Hobbs | 3:23 |
| 2. | "She Never Makes Me Cry" | | 3:53 |
| 3. | "Don't Let Her Get Away" | Anderson | 3:04 |
| 4. | "Someday" | Richard Marx | 3:36 |
| 5. | "These Broken Hearts" | Pete Wasner | 4:51 |
| 6. | "We Had It All" | | 3:58 |
| 7. | "Young Man's Town" | | 4:30 |
| 8. | "Real Mean Bottle" | | 3:15 |
| 9. | "Whippoorwill River" | Dean Dillon | 5:45 |
| 10. | "The Sun's Gonna Shine on You" | Reed Nielsen | 3:17 |
| 11. | "From Where I Stand" | Anderson; Hobbs | 3:38 |
| 12. | "You Ain't Foolin' Nobody" | Nielsen | 3:49 |
| 13. | "Old Time Fiddle" | Leslie Satcher | 2:48 |
| 14. | "Without You" | | 3:08 |
| 15. | "Two Hearts" | Satcher | 3:59 |
| 16. | "This Old Guitar and Me" | | 3:47 |
| 17. | "In These Last Few Days" | | 3:32 |

== Personnel ==
As listed in liner notes.

- Vince Gill – lead vocals, backing vocals, acoustic guitar, electric guitar, mandolin
- John Hobbs – keyboards, string arrangements (4, 5)
- Pete Wasner – keyboards
- Jim Hoke – accordion, autoharp, harmonica
- Mac McAnally – acoustic guitar
- Dean Parks – electric guitar
- Al Anderson – acoustic guitar (1, 3, 11), electric guitar (1, 3, 11)
- Tom Britt – slide guitar (1)
- John Hughey – steel guitar
- Willie Weeks – bass guitar
- Chad Cromwell – drums
- Eric Darken – percussion
- Stuart Duncan – fiddle
- Kirk Whalum – alto saxophone (1)
- Jim Horn – baritone saxophone (1), horn arrangements (1)
- Steve Herrman – trombone (1)
- Charles Rose – trumpet (1)
- The Nashville String Machine – strings (4, 5)

Harmony vocalists

- Bekka Bramlett (1, 11)
- Billy Thomas (1, 2, 4, 6, 10, 12)
- Harry Stinson (2, 12)
- Jeff White (3)
- Andrea Zonn (3)
- Michael McDonald (5)
- Kim Keyes (6, 10)
- Emmylou Harris (7)
- Dawn Sears (8, 14)
- Jenny Gill (9)
- Leslie Satcher (13)
- Lee Ann Womack (15)
- Amy Grant (17)

=== Production ===
- Vince Gill – producer, art direction
- Justin Niebank – recording, mixing
- David Bryant – recording assistant
- Sang Park – mix assistant
- Steve Bishir – overdub recording
- Steve Marcantonio – overdub recording
- J.C. Monterrosa – overdub recording assistant
- Hank Nirider – overdub recording assistant
- Doug Sax – mastering at The Mastering Lab (Hollywood, California)
- Traci Sterling Bishir – production manager
- Michelle Bentrem – production managing assistant
- Jim Kemp – art direction
- Karen Naff – design
- Andrew Eccles – photography
- Trish Townsend – wardrobe stylist
- Mary Beth Felts – hair, make-up
- The Fitzgerald Hartley Co. – management

== Charts ==
=== Weekly charts ===
| Chart (2003) | Peak position |
|---|---|
| US Billboard 200 | 14 |
| US Top Country Albums (Billboard) | 4 |

=== Year-end charts ===
| Chart (2003) | Position |
|---|---|
| US Top Country Albums (Billboard) | 39 |
