= Emmylou Harris appearances =

This article represents all other appearances that Emmylou Harris has contributed to.

== Solo contributions ==
Title	Songwriter	Length	Producer	Source	Date	Notes
"A Love That Will Never Grow Old"	Gustavo Santaolalla, Bernie Taupin	3:20	Gustavo Santaolalla	Brokeback Mountain by various artists	2005	^{[A]} ST
"To Daddy"	Dolly Parton	2:44	Steve Buckingham	Just Because I'm a Woman: Songs of Dolly Parton by various artists	2003	
"Back in Baby's Arms"	Bobby Montgomery	2:02	Jimmy Bowen, Emmylou Harris	Planes, Trains & Automobiles by various artists	1987	ST
"Barbara Allen"	traditional	4:35	Steve Buckingham, Emory Gordy, John Leventhal, David Mansfield, Chris Farren, Gillian Welch, David Rawlings, Chris Covert, Ken Levitan	Songcatcher: Music from and Inspired by the Motion Picture by various artists	2001	ST
"Child Of Mine"	Carole King, Gerry Goffin	3:27	Emmylou Harris	Til Their Eyes Shine (The Lullaby Album) by various artists	1992	
"Deeper Well"	David Olney, Emmylou Harris, Daniel Lanois	5:59		Lilith Fair: A Celebration of Women in Music, Vol. 3 by various artists	1999	
"Even Cowgirls Get the Blues"	Rodney Crowell	3:45	Nathaniel Kunkel, Russ Kunkel, Graham Nash	A Tribute to Nicolette Larson: Lotta Love Concert by various artists (recorded February 1998)	2006	
"Going Back to Harlan"	(Kate &) Anna McGarrigle	5:04	Tim Oberthier	Lilith Fair: A Celebration of Women in Music by various artists	1998	
"The Good Book"	Rainer Ptacek	4:00		The Inner Flame: Rainer Ptacek Tribute by various artists	1997	
"Green Pastures"	Traditional	3:26	T-Bone Burnett	Down from the Mountain by various artists	2000	ST
"Hobo's Lullaby"	Goebel Reeves	2:43	Emmylou Harris	Folkways: A Vision Shared - A Tribute to Woody Guthrie and Leadbelly by various artists	1988	
"Icy Blue Heart"	John Hiatt	4:10	Steve Buckingham	It'll Come to You: The Songs of John Hiatt by various artists	2003	
"In Rodanthe"	Emmylou Harris	5:26		Soundtrack for Nights in Rodanthe by various artists	2008	ST
"Love Still Remains"	Kate Wolf	4:35	Nina Gerber	Treasures Left Behind: Remembering Kate Wolf by various artists	1998	
"Mama's Hungry Eyes"	Merle Haggard	3:38	Brian Ahern	Mama's Hungry Eyes: A Tribute to Merle Haggard by various artists	1994	
"The Magdalene Laundries"	Joni Mitchell	3:43	Brian Ahern	A Tribute to Joni Mitchell by various artists	2007	
"No Regrets (Non, Je Ne Regrette Rien)"	Tom Rush	3:16	Neil Giraldo, Ann Wilson, Jacques Arnoul	Tribute to Edith Piaf by various artists	1994	
"On the Wings of Horses"	Stephen Collins Foster, Jay Levy Pedersen, Herb Pedersen	3:08	Herb Pedersen, Jay Levy Pedersen	Country Music for Kids by various artists	1992	
"Only the Heart May Know"	Dan Fogelberg	4:09	Dan Fogelberg	The Innocent Age by Dan Folgerberg	1982	
"Ordinary Heart"	Emmylou Harris, Kimmie Rhodes	2:58	Buddy Miller, Steve Fishell, Emmylou Harris	Happy, Texas by various artists	1999	ST
"The Pearl"	Emmylou Harris	5:19	Julia Olin	Concerts for a Land Mine Free World by various artists	2000	
"Slow Surprise"	Chris Smither	3:55	Brian Ahern	The Horse Whisperer (original soundtrack) by various artists	1998	ST
"The Snake Song"	Townes Van Zandt	2:33	Freddy Fletcher, Eric Paul	Poet: A Tribute to Townes Van Zandt by various artists	2001	
"So You Think You're a Cowboy"	Hank Cochran, Willie Nelson	2:32	Willie Nelson	Honeysuckle Rose by Willie Nelson and various artists	1980	ST
"Song to John"	June Carter Cash	4:00	John Carter Cash	Anchored in Love: A Tribute to June Carter Cash by various artists	2007	
"The Speed of Sound"	Jesse Harris	4:19	Brian Ahern, M. Ward	The Hottest State (Original Soundtrack) by various artists	2007	ST
"Wondering"	Joe Werner	3:03	Gail Davies	Caught in the Webb: A Tribute to the Legendary Webb Pierce by various artists	2002	

^{A} Won the Golden Globe Award for Best Original Song.

== Collaborations A–F ==
See Emmylou Harris collaborations A–F

== Collaborations G–K ==
See Emmylou Harris collaborations G–K

== Collaborations L–Q ==
See Emmylou Harris collaborations L–Q

== Collaborations R–Z ==
See Emmylou Harris collaborations R–Z
