= Malcolm Holcombe =

American singer-songwriter (1955–2024)

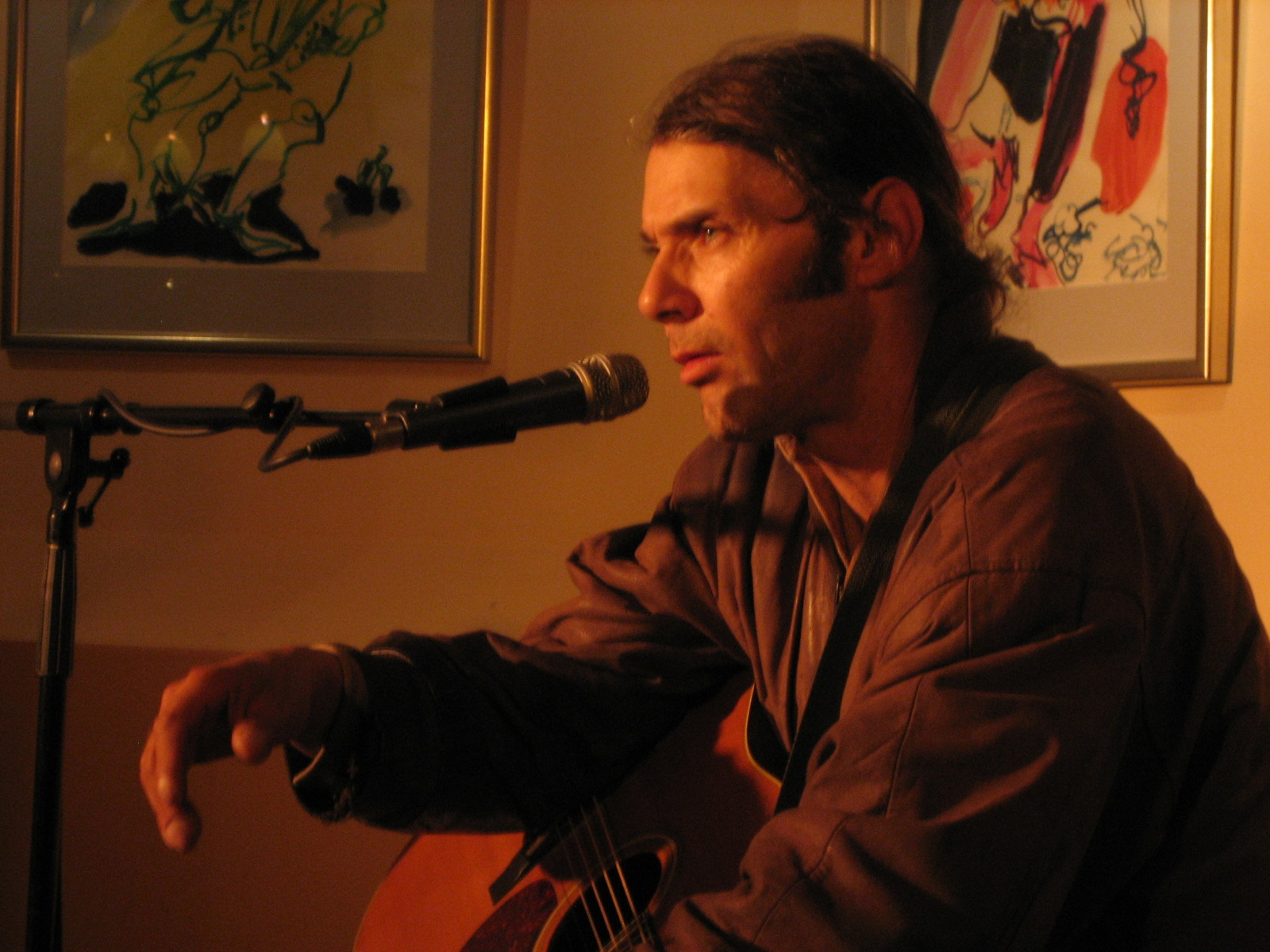
- Holcombe performing in 2007

Background information
- Birth name: Malcolm Brank Holcombe
- Born: September 2, 1955; Weaverville, North Carolina, U.S.
- Died: March 9, 2024 (aged 68); Asheville, North Carolina, U.S.
- Genres: Folk music, Americana music, Alternative country
- Occupation(s): Musician, songwriter
- Instrument: Guitar
- Years active: 1984–2024
- Labels: Hip-O, Music Road, Munich, Gypsy Eyes, Southbound, Proper
- Website: malcolmholcombe.com

Malcolm Holcombe (September 2, 1955 – March 9, 2024) was an American singer-songwriter.

== Early history ==
Holcombe was born and raised in Weaverville, North Carolina, about ten miles north of Asheville. In his teen years, he played in local bands The Hilltoppers and Redwing, and since the early 1990s performed solo as a singer-songwriter.

After high school, Holcombe attended college and tech school, then quit to play music around the Southeast. He partnered with Ray Sisk and Dallas Taylor in a trio, and released the album Trademark with Sam Milner in 1985.

== A Hundred Lies ==
Holcombe moved to Nashville, Tennessee, in 1990, working as a dishwasher at Douglas Corner Cafe and playing open mic shows. In 1996, Holcombe signed with Geffen Records. Promotional copies of his debut album A Hundred Lies drew praise from critics, and it was officially released in 1999 by Hip-O Records.

== Subsequent recordings ==
Holcombe returned to North Carolina, married, and released several albums independently. His 2008 album Gamblin' House was produced by Ray Kennedy and released on North Carolina–based label Echo Mountain.

2010's To Drink the Rain was produced by Jared Tyler, who also played resonator guitar. Dave Roe (bass), Luke Bulla (fiddle), Bobby Kallus (drums), and Shelby Eicher (mandolin) provided accompaniment.

For The RCA Sessions in 2014, Holcombe re-recorded at least one song from each of his previous albums and EP, and one new song "Mouth Harp Man." Guests included Tyler, David Roe Rorick (bass), Tammy Rogers (fiddle, mandolin), Ken Coomer (drums), Jellyroll Johnson (harmonica), and Siobhan Maher Kennedy (vocals). Maura O'Connell duets with Holcombe on "A Far Cry From Here."

Pretty Little Troubles in 2017 was produced by Darrell Scott and accompanied by Tyler, Dennis Crouch (bass), Verlon Thompson (guitar), and Marco Giovino (percussion).

== Death ==
On March 9, 2024, Holcombe died of respiratory failure due to cancer. He was 68.

== Discography ==
=== Solo albums ===
- 1994: A Far Cry From Here (Io Music)
- 1999: A Hundred Lies (Hip-O)
- 2003: Another Wisdom (Purple Girl)
- 2005: I Never Heard You Knockin' (self-released)
- 2006: Not Forgotten (Munich)
- 2008: Gamblin' House (Echo Mountain)
- 2009: For the Mission Baby (Echo Mountain)
- 2011: To Drink the Rain (Music Road)
- 2012: Down The River (Gypsy Eyes)
- 2014: The RCA Sessions (Proper), re-recorded previously released material plus an EP
- 2014: Pitiful Blues (self-released)
- 2016: Another Black Hole (Proper)
- 2017: Pretty Little Troubles (Gypsy Eyes)
- 2018: Come Hell or High Water (Singular Recordings)
- 2018: Animated Sanctuary b/w Justice In The Cradle (single) (Need To Know)
- 2019: Lumberjack (Hardcore Dollar) b/w The Old North Side (single) (Need To Know)
- 2020: Tricks of the Trade (Singular Recordings) (issued on vinyl, Spring 2021)
- 2022: Bits & Pieces (issued on CD and vinyl, April 21 2023)

=== With Sam Milner ===
- 1984: Trademark (Upstream)

=== As composer ===
- 2006: Jonah Smith – Jonah Smith (Relix) – track 11, "Dressed in White"
- 2015: Jonathan Edwards – Tomorrow's Child (Rising) – track 1, "Down In the Woods"

=== Also appears on ===
- 2000: Jenn Adams – In the Pool (White Boxer)
- 2003: Various artists – The Slaughter Rule (Bloodshot) – track 19, "Killing the Blues"
- 2003: Various artists – The Living Room: Live in NYC, Vol. 1 (Stanton St.) – track 5, "To the Homeland"; track 6, "Dressed in White"; track 7, "Yesterdays Clothes"
- 2004: Various artists – Return to Cold Mountain: Songs Inspired By the Film (Compendia Music Group) – track 3, "Back in '29"
- 2006: Dayna Kurtz – Another Black Feather (Munich / Kismet)
- 2011: Various artists – The Six Sessions (Continental Song City) – track 1–17, "Leonard's Pigpen"
