= Next Big Thing (song) =

Single by Vince Gill

from the album Next Big Thing
- B-side: "Someday"
- Released: November 2002
- Recorded: 2002
- Genre: Country
- Length: 3:23
- Label: MCA Nashville
- Songwriters: Vince Gill, Al Anderson, John Hobbs
- Producer: Vince Gill

Vince Gill singles chronology
"Shoot Straight from Your Heart" (2001)	"Next Big Thing" (2002)	"Someday" (2003)

"Next Big Thing" is a song co-written and recorded by American country music artist Vince Gill. It was released in November 2002 as the first single and title track from the album Next Big Thing. The song reached #17 on the Billboard Hot Country Singles & Tracks chart. The song was written by Gill, Al Anderson and John Hobbs.

== Chart performance ==
Chart (2002–2003)	Peak position
US Hot Country Songs (Billboard)	17
US Bubbling Under Hot 100 (Billboard)	5
