= Tribute (Roy Rogers album) =

Studio album by Roy Rogers
- Released: September 24, 1991
- Genre: Country
- Length: 34:24
- Label: RCA Records
- Producer: Richard Landis

Roy Rogers chronology
Happy Trails to You (1975)	Tribute (1991)

Professional ratings
Review scores
Source	Rating
Allmusic	3/5 stars

Tribute is the fourth and final studio album by American country music artist Roy Rogers, released in 1991 by RCA Records. The album peaked at number 17 on the Billboard Top Country Albums chart.

== Track listing ==
No.	Title	Writer(s)	Duet partner(s)	Length
1.	"That's How the West Was Swung"	Gene Pistilli, Troy Seals	The Kentucky Headhunters	3:10
2.	"Here's Hopin'"	Bob Regan, Mark D. Sanders	Randy Travis	2:56
3.	"Hold On Partner"	Bobby Paine, Larson Paine	Clint Black	2:00
4.	"Tumbling Tumbleweeds"	Bob Nolan	K. T. Oslin and Restless Heart	4:26
5.	"Little Joe, the Wrangler"	Ellis Tarrant, Marc Williams	Emmylou Harris	2:45
6.	"When Payday Rolls Around"	Nolan	Ricky Van Shelton	2:17
7.	"Final Frontier"	Gidget Baird, Norman DeVasure, Richard Allen Jones, Daniel Paul	Kathy Mattea	2:25
8.	"Don't Fence Me In"	Robert Fletcher, Cole Porter	Lorrie Morgan and The Oak Ridge Boys	2:44
9.	"Rodeo Road"	Chuck Cannon, Allen Shamblin	Willie Nelson	2:21
10.	"Alive and Kickin'"	Roy Rogers		2:20
11.	"King of the Cowboys"	Larry Carney, Rogers	Dusty Rogers	3:29
12.	"Happy Trails"	Dale Evans	Dale Evans and Dusty Rogers	3:21

== Chart performance ==
Chart (1991)	Peak position
U.S. Billboard Top Country Albums	17
U.S. Billboard 200	113
