= Kate Campbell =

American folk singer-songwriter

- Born: October 31, 1961 (age 64)
- Origin: New Orleans, Louisiana
- Genres: Folk, country, Americana
- Occupation: Singer-songwriter
- Instruments: Acoustic guitar, piano
- Years active: 1994 - present
- Website: www.katecampbell.com

Jamae Kathryn Campbell (born October 31, 1961, in New Orleans, Louisiana) is an American folk singer-songwriter.

Kate's songwriting follows in the southern literary tradition with an emphasis on a sense of place, race, and religion. Her story-filled songs feature quirky characters and often deal with the region's complex issues. John Prine, Nanci Griffith, Emmylou Harris, Rodney Crowell, Guy Clark, Maura O'Connell, and Mac McAnally have provided guest vocals on her albums.

She sometimes performs with Pierce Pettis and Tom Kimmel as the New Agrarians.

== Early life ==
Campbell was born in New Orleans, Louisiana, and spent her early years in Sledge, Mississippi. Her mother, a singer and piano player, was her strongest early musical influence. Her father was a Baptist preacher, and her grandfather was a bluegrass fiddle and banjo player. As a child, Campbell studied classical piano and clarinet before eventually learning the guitar. She earned undergraduate degrees in music and history from Samford University and a master's degree in history from Auburn University.

== Career ==
Having moved to Nashville to pursue music, Campbell released her debut album, Songs from the Levee, in 1995 on Compass Records. Three further albums – Moonpie Dreams (1997), Visions of Plenty (1998), and Rosaryville (1999) – were released by the label. When Compass declined to sell Campbell masters to the latter three albums, she re-recorded the majority of the material on The Portable Kate Campbell and Sing Me Out, both released in 2004.

In addition to Americana and folk-flavored albums, her catalog includes Twang on a Wire, which features covers of songs made famous by female country artists of the 1960s and 1970s; the piano-based 1000 Pound Machine; and two gospel CDs (Wandering Strange and For the Living of These Days) recorded at FAME Studios in Muscle Shoals with Spooner Oldham on keyboards. Her producers over the years include Johnny Pierce, Walt Aldridge, and Will Kimbrough.

== Discography ==
- Songs from the Levee (1994, re-issued 2004)
- Moonpie Dreams (1997)
- Visions of Plenty (1998)
- Rosaryville (1999)
- Wandering Strange (2001)
- Monuments (2003)
- Twang on a Wire (2003)
- Sing Me Out (2004)
- The Portable Kate Campbell (2004)
- Blues and Lamentations (2005)
- Sidetracks (Digital EP) (2005)
- For the Living of These Days (with Spooner Oldham) (2006)
- Save the Day (2008)
- Two Nights in Texas (2011)
- 1000 Pound Machine (2012)
- Live at the Library (with Wayne Flynt) (2013)
- Due South Co-op (with the New Agrarians) (Never officially released; preview copies made available in 2013)
- The K.O.A. Tapes (Vol. 1) (2016)
- Damn Sure Blue (2018)

=== Compilations ===
Campbell appears on the following compilations, among others:

- Leak CD Magazine Issue 4 Fall 1994
- New Country August 1995
- Uncut CD Magazine: Sounds Of The New West Issue 5 September 1998
- Freight Train Blues: Classic Railroad Songs Volume 4 (2000)
- Making God Smile: An Artists' Tribute to the Songs of Beach Boy Brian Wilson (2002)
- Songs Inspired by To Kill A Mockingbird
- Evening Star Compilation Volume 2
- Oxford American Southern Music CD No. 1
- God in Music City
- Best of Woodsongs Old-time Radio Hour Volume 1
- Best New Women of Country
- Viva Americana
- Crowd Around the Mic WNCW Volume 2
- Bird Songs
- Do Right Men (A Tribute to Dan Penn and Spooner Oldham)
