= Jared Tyler =

American singer

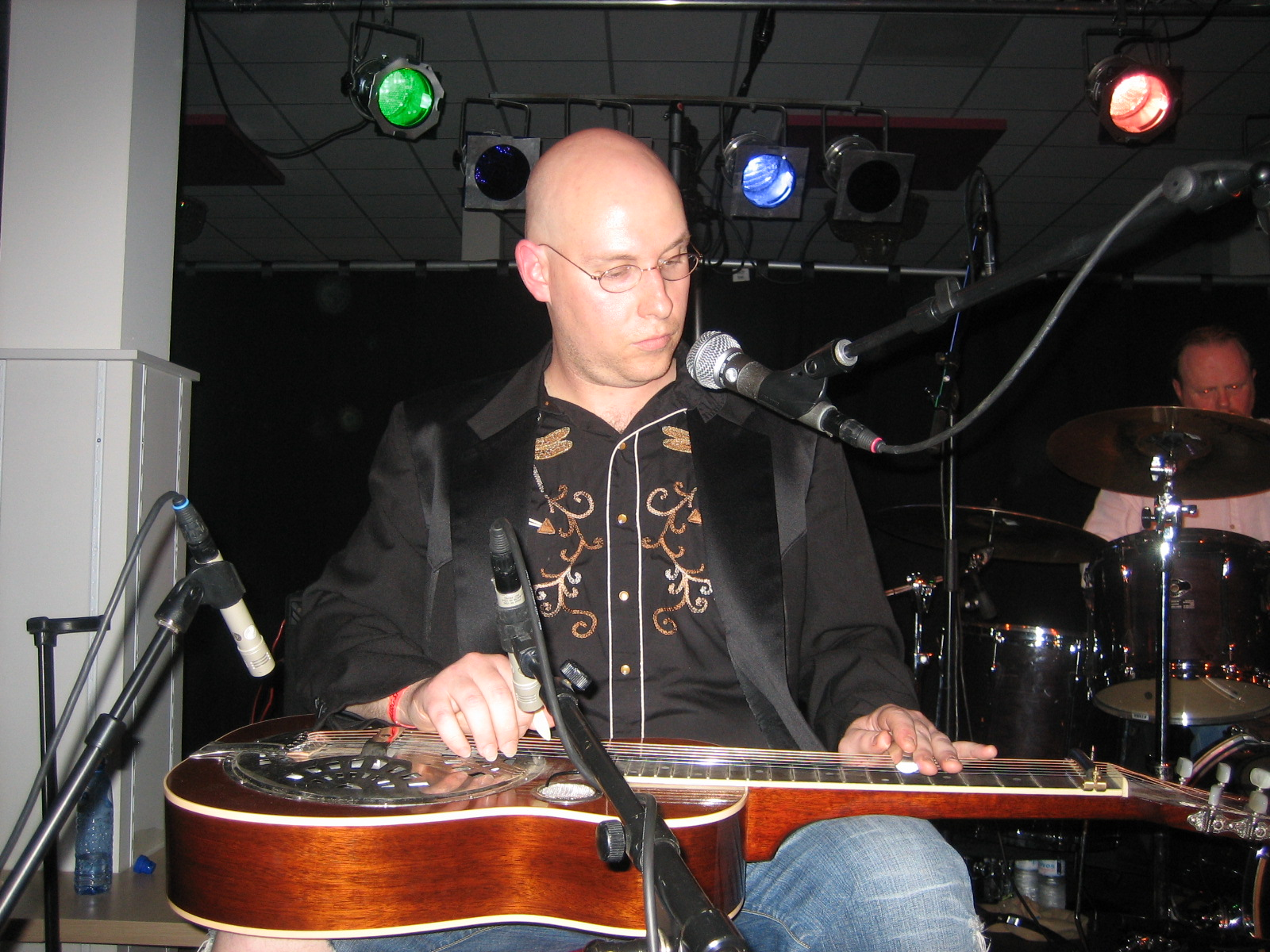

Jared Tyler is an American singer-songwriter from Tulsa, Oklahoma. He made his national debut with the release of Blue Alleluia, an album produced by Russ Titelman on Walking Liberty Records, New York City.

Tyler has been the supporting act for many artists and bands such as Emmylou Harris, Nickel Creek, Merle Haggard, Wilco, Shelby Lynne, Dave Wilcox, Shannon Lawson, John Hammond and Willis Alan Ramsey. As well as touring with Malcolm Holcombe, Tyler has recorded with Holcombe; Shannon Lawson; The Tractors; Jelly Roll Johnson; bassist and producer Dave Pomeroy; and producer Scott Harding, EmmyLou Harris, Mary Kay Place, Dave Wilcox, and others.
