= Desmond Pringle =

American gospel musician (born 1970)

- Born: Desmond Clinton Pringle; April 22, 1970 (age 56); Charleston, South Carolina
- Origin: Chicago, Illinois
- Genres: gospel, traditional black gospel, urban contemporary gospel
- Occupations: Singer, songwriter
- Instrument: Vocals
- Years active: 2000–present
- Labels: Tommy Boy, Central South, Kingdom
- Website: desmondpringle.com

Desmond Clinton Pringle (born April 22, 1970) is an American gospel musician. He started his music career, in 2000, and his first studio album released in 2001. He has released three albums with all of them charting on the Billboard magazine Gospel Albums chart. He has released albums with only three labels, and those are Tommy Boy Records, Central South Music, and Kingdom Records.

== Early life ==
Pringle was born Desmond Clinton Pringle, on April 22, 1970, in Charleston, South Carolina, and his parents were of the Reformed Episcopal church, which was where he was christened as a baby. He attended, Winthrop University He would relocate to Chicago, Illinois, after touring was over. He was mentored by T. D. Jakes and Clay Evans, during his formative songwriting days.

== Music career ==
His solo recording career began in 1999, with the self-released project, but his first major deal was not released until 2001. He released, Loyalty, with Tommy Boy Records on January 16, 2001, and this charted on five Billboard magazine charts. His second album, Be Still, released on September 26, 2006, by Central South Music, only charted on the Billboard Gospel Albums chart; likewise, the third album, Fidelity, released on May 14, 2013, by Kingdom Records, only placed on the aforementioned chart.

== Discography ==
List of studio albums, with selected chart positions
Title	Album details	Peak chart positions
Title	Album details	US Gos
Loyalty	Released: January 16, 2001; Label: Tommy Boy; CD, digital download	9
Be Still	Released: September 26, 2006; Label: Central South; CD, digital download	42
Fidelity	Released: May 14, 2013; Label: Kingdom; CD, digital download	48
