= Love Letters (Leslie Satcher album) =

Studio album by Leslie Satcher
- Released: November 14, 2000
- Genre: Country
- Length: 44:56
- Label: Warner Bros.
- Producer: Luke Wooten

Leslie Satcher chronology
Love Letters (2000)	Creation (2005)

Love Letters is the debut album from American country music artist Leslie Satcher. It was released in 2000 on Warner Bros. Records. Although it produced four singles, none of them charted. Satcher wrote or co-wrote eleven of its twelve tracks, with the only outside contribution being her cover of Bobbie Gentry's "Ode to Billie Joe".

== Reception ==
Billboard magazine said with the album, "intelligent lyrics meet powerhouse vocals and passionate performance" calling the combination "lethal". Chuck Taylor agreed, calling Love Letters "an impressive collection of well-crafted songs". Texas Monthly remarked that "though Satcher is occasionally guilty of trite lyrics or oversinging, her career is off to a promising start." Taking into account Satcher's songwriter background, People magazine called the album "a welcome entrance from behind the scenes" but "bad news for Nashville's other singers, since Satcher...may be tempted to keep her best work for herself from now on."

== Track listing ==
All tracks are written by Leslie Satcher, unless otherwise noted.

No.	Title	Writer(s)	Length
1.	"Love Letters From Old Mexico"		4:00
2.	"Slow Way Home"		3:29
3.	"Every Time It Rains"	Leslie Satcher; Bobby Carmichael	3:03
4.	"Goin' Down Hard"	Leslie Satcher; Larry Cordie; Don Poythress	3:45
5.	"It Can't Be Good to Hurt That Bad"		3:27
6.	"Ode to Billie Joe"	Bobbie Gentry	5:04
7.	"A Man with Eighteen Wheels"	Leslie Satcher; Bobby Carmichael	3:36
8.	"I Will Survive"		3:00
9.	"Burn Me Down"		4:21
10.	"Look Who's Talking Now"	Leslie Satcher; Melba Montgomery; Jerry Salley	3:35
11.	"Texarkana (Wide Open Spaces)"		2:55
12.	"White" (Bonus song)		4:41
Total length:			44:56

== Personnel ==
- David Angell- violin
- Larry Beaird- acoustic guitar
- Dennis Burnside- string arrangements
- J.T. Corenflos- electric baritone guitar, electric guitar
- David Davidson- violin
- Glen Duncan- fiddle
- Connie Ellisor- violin
- Sonny Garrish- steel guitar
- Carl Gorodetzky- string contractor
- Kevin "Swine" Grantt- bass guitar
- Mickey Grimm- percussion
- Owen Hale- drums
- Randy Hardison- drums
- Emmylou Harris- background vocals on "Love Letters From Old Mexico"
- Wes Hightower- background vocals
- Steve Hinson- dobro
- Alison Krauss- background vocals on "Love Letters From Old Mexico" and "Look Who's Talking Now"
- Lee Larrison- violin
- Paul Leim- drums
- B. James Lowry- acoustic guitar
- Bob Mason- cello
- Cate Myer- violin
- Mickey Raphael- harmonica
- Michael Rhodes- bass guitar
- Jerry Salley- background vocals
- Leslie Satcher- lead vocals
- Steve Sheehan- acoustic guitar
- Pam Sixfin- violin
- Catherine Styron- piano
- Alan Umstead- violin
- Catherine Umstead- violin
- Gary Van Osdale- viola, violin
- Biff Watson- acoustic guitar
- Kris Wilkinson- violin
- Lonnie Wilson- drums
- Jeannie L. Winn- background vocals
- Glenn Worf- bass guitar
- Paul Worley- acoustic guitar
