= Barry and Holly Tashian =

American country, folk and bluegrass duo

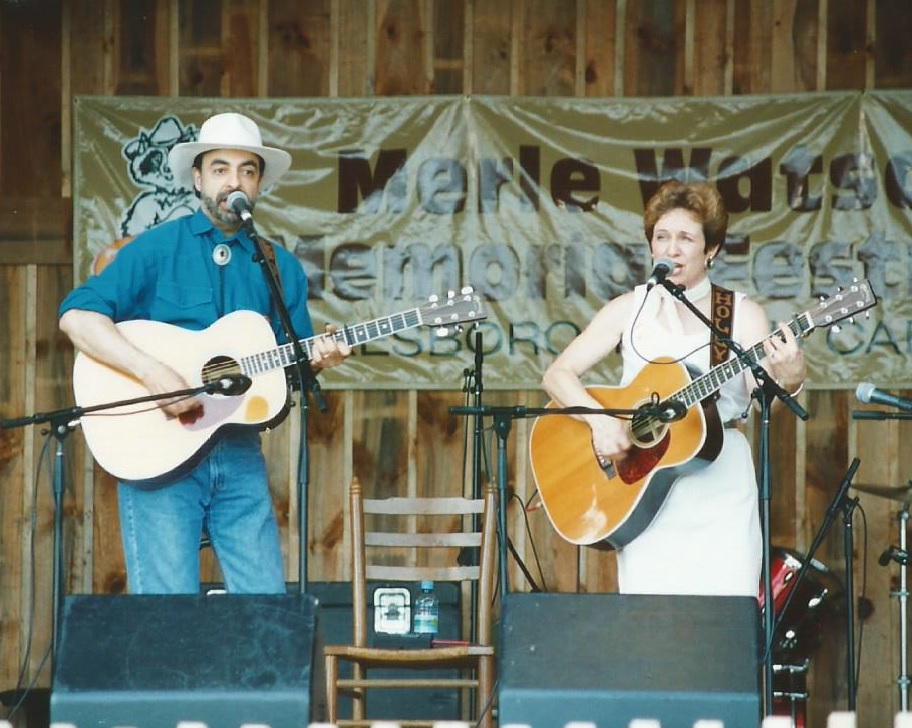
The Tashians performing at Merlefest in 1994

Barry and Holly Tashian are an American country, folk and bluegrass duo. They are both singer-songwriters and musicians. They have performed and recorded together since 1972. The Tashians have recorded seven albums since 1989, and they have been awarded the National Association of Independent Record Distributors (NAIRD) award for their album "Straw into Gold" (Country Album of the Year). Barry has three CDs out with the Remains. They received a Boston Music Award for Best Country album for "Straw Into Gold". In 1998 their album, "Harmony" was nominated for Bluegrass Album of the Year by the Nashville Music Awards. As songwriters, Barry and Holly have written for Kenny Rogers, Solomon Burke, Ty England, Daniel O'Donnell, the Nashville Bluegrass Band, Roland White, Kate Brislin and Jody Stecher, Niall Toner, and many others. Barry Tashian first won acclaim as a member of the Remains. Barry made his TV debut in 1958 on "American Bandstand". He then later was a member of Emmylou Harris' Hot Band. Barry and Holly have recorded with Tom Paxton, Charlie Louvin, Nanci Griffith, Iris DeMent, Suzy Bogguss, and Delia Bell.

They have performed at the MerleFest, Strawberry Music Festival, Swiss Alps Country Music Festival, Lincoln Center, Wintergrass, the Bethlehem, Pennsylvania, Musikfest, and numerous European and Australian festivals.

They released three albums on the Rounder Records label, which houses Alison Krauss.

They have been profiled in The Boston Globe, The Boston Herald, the Los Angeles Times, The Tennessean, The Columbia Dispatch, and many other newspapers, and Billboard, Rolling Stone, and other magazines.

== Biography ==
Barry and Holly Tashian have appeared as a duo on many nationally syndicated radio shows, including A Prairie Home Companion with Garrison Keillor, E-Town, Grand Ole Opry, BBC Radio, and World Café.

They have also appeared on many nationally syndicated television programs, including TNN shows American Music Shop, Grand Ole Opry Live and Backstage at the Opry.

They have performed at the Merle Watson Festival, Strawberry Music Festival, Swiss Alps Country Music Festival, Lincoln Center, Wintergrass, Bethlehem Musik Festival, and numerous European and Australian festivals.

Their songwriting cuts include The Nashville Bluegrass Band ("Home"), Emmylou Harris ("I'll Take My Time Going Home"), Kenny Rogers ("Honey, Where's The Money Gone"), Roland White ("Lucky Break"), The Gordons ("Cottonmill", "After All This Time"), Ty England ("Two Ways To Fall"), Special Consensus ("Is My Home Still Up There"), and more.

Their son Daniel Tashian is the leader of Nashville pop band The Silver Seas and a Grammy award-winning songwriter.

== Discography ==
=== Albums ===
- Trust in Me (1989, Northeastern)
- Ready for Love (1993, Rounder)
- Straw into Gold (1994, Rounder)
- Live in Holland (1995, Strictly Country)
- Harmony (1997, Rounder)
- At Home (2002, Copper Creek)
- Long Story Short (2008, Rock-A-Lot Records)

== Awards ==
- National Association of Independent Record Distributors (NAIRD) – Country Album of the Year for "Straw Into Gold"
- Boston Music Award for Best Country album
