= Leslie Satcher =

American singer-songwriter

- Born: Leslie Winn Satcher; 1962 (age 63–64); Paris, Texas, U.S.
- Genres: Country; Bluegrass
- Occupation: Singer-songwriter
- Instrument: Vocals
- Years active: 1989–present
- Label: Warner Bros.
- Website: http://lesliesatcher.com/

Leslie Winn Satcher (born 1962) is a singer-songwriter based in Nashville, Tennessee. She has recorded two albums of her own, and has additionally co-written several singles for such artists as George Strait, Martina McBride, Pam Tillis, Gretchen Wilson, Patty Loveless, and Vince Gill.

== Biography and career ==
Satcher grew up in her birthplace of Paris, Texas, United States, where she sang in local churches and schools – an experience which she lists as one of her biggest influences. In an interveiew, she recounted that the first song she wrote was when she was 15, about a boy. In 1989, she moved to Nashville, Tennessee to pursue her dream of being a country music singer. However, she found a niche writing the songs for which she is most well known—including many by notable country music acts like Patty Loveless, Vince Gill, Willie Nelson, and Reba McEntire. Pam Tillis reached number 12 on the country charts in 1998 with Satcher's "I Said a Prayer". In 2002, Martina McBride's performance of her song "When God-Fearin' Women Get the Blues" reached number 8 in the United States, while her 2006 song "Politically Uncorrect", performed by Merle Haggard and Gretchen Wilson, reached number 23 and was nominated for a Grammy award.

At the same time, her singing career also began to take off, following her signing with Warner Bros. Records, and the release of her first album Love Letters in 2002. This was followed by the independent release of Creation in 2005, which she has been touring to promote. Her work has met with critical acclaim, with the Texas State Legislature calling her:

[Able] to craft songs that capture the ears and hearts of music lovers and honoring her [...] for bringing further acclaim to the illustrious musical reputation of the Lone Star State; and, be it further [..] an expression of high regard by the Texas House of Representatives and Senate.

USA Today listed her as part of a "groundswell" in traditional country and bluegrass music. Leslie Satcher continues to write and sing, after taking some time off in 2006.

In 2008, two songs she co-wrote with Monty Holmes, "Troubadour" and "House Of Cash" were recorded by George Strait.

In 2017, Leslie and The Electric Honey Badgers released the single "This Won't Take Long", featuring Vince Gill and Sheryl Crow.

== Discography ==
=== Albums ===
Title	Album details
Love Letters	Release date: November 14, 2000; Label: Warner Bros. Records
Creation	Release date: July 18, 2005; Label: Jellan Records

=== Singles ===
Year	Single	Album
2001	"Love Letters from Old Mexico"	Love Letters
2001	"Burn Me Down"	Love Letters
2001	"Ode to Billie Joe"	Love Letters
2002	"Slow Way Home"	Love Letters
2017	"This Won't Take Long"	
