= Lány =

Lány may refer to places in the Czech Republic:

- Lány (Chrudim District), a municipality and village in the Pardubice Region
- Lány (Havlíčkův Brod District), a municipality and village in the Vysočina Region
- Lány (Kladno District), a municipality and village in the Central Bohemian Region
  - Lány Castle
- Lány u Dašic, a municipality and village in the South Bohemian Region
- Lány, a village and part of Červené Janovice in the Central Bohemian Region
- Lány, a village and part of Kostomlaty nad Labem in the Central Bohemian Region
- Lány, a village and part of Lázně Bělohrad in the Hradec Králové Region
- Lány, a town part of Litomyšl in the Pardubice Region
- Lány, a town part of Svitavy in the Pardubice Region
- Lány na Důlku, a village and part of Pardubice in the Pardubice Region
