= Lainie =

Lainie is a given name. Notable people with the name include:

- Lainie Kazan (born 1940), American actor
- Lainie Strouse (Jordan) American & European actor, producer, singer, model
- Lainie Frasier, American film, television and video-game actor
- Lainie Marsh, American singer-songwriter
- Lainie Friedman Ross, American physician and bioethicist

== See also ==
- Lany (disambiguation)
- Laney (disambiguation)
- Lainey
