= Thanks to You (disambiguation) =

"Thanks to You" is a 1982 song by the American band Sinnamon.

"Thanks to You" may also refer to:

- "Thanks to You", a song by Jesse Winchester from the 1988 album Humour Me; also recorded by Emmylou Harris on Cowgirl's Prayer
- "Thanks to You", a song by Marty Stuart from the 1996 album Honky Tonkin's What I Do Best
