= Kozojedy =

Kozojedy may refer to places in the Czech Republic:

- Kozojedy (Jičín District), a municipality and village in the Hradec Králové Region
- Kozojedy (Plzeň-North District), a municipality and village in the Plzeň Region
- Kozojedy (Prague-East District), a municipality and village in the Central Bohemian Region
- Kozojedy (Rakovník District), a municipality and village in the Central Bohemian Region
- Kozojedy, a village and part of Lány (Chrudim District) in the Pardubice Region
