= Palau Public Library =

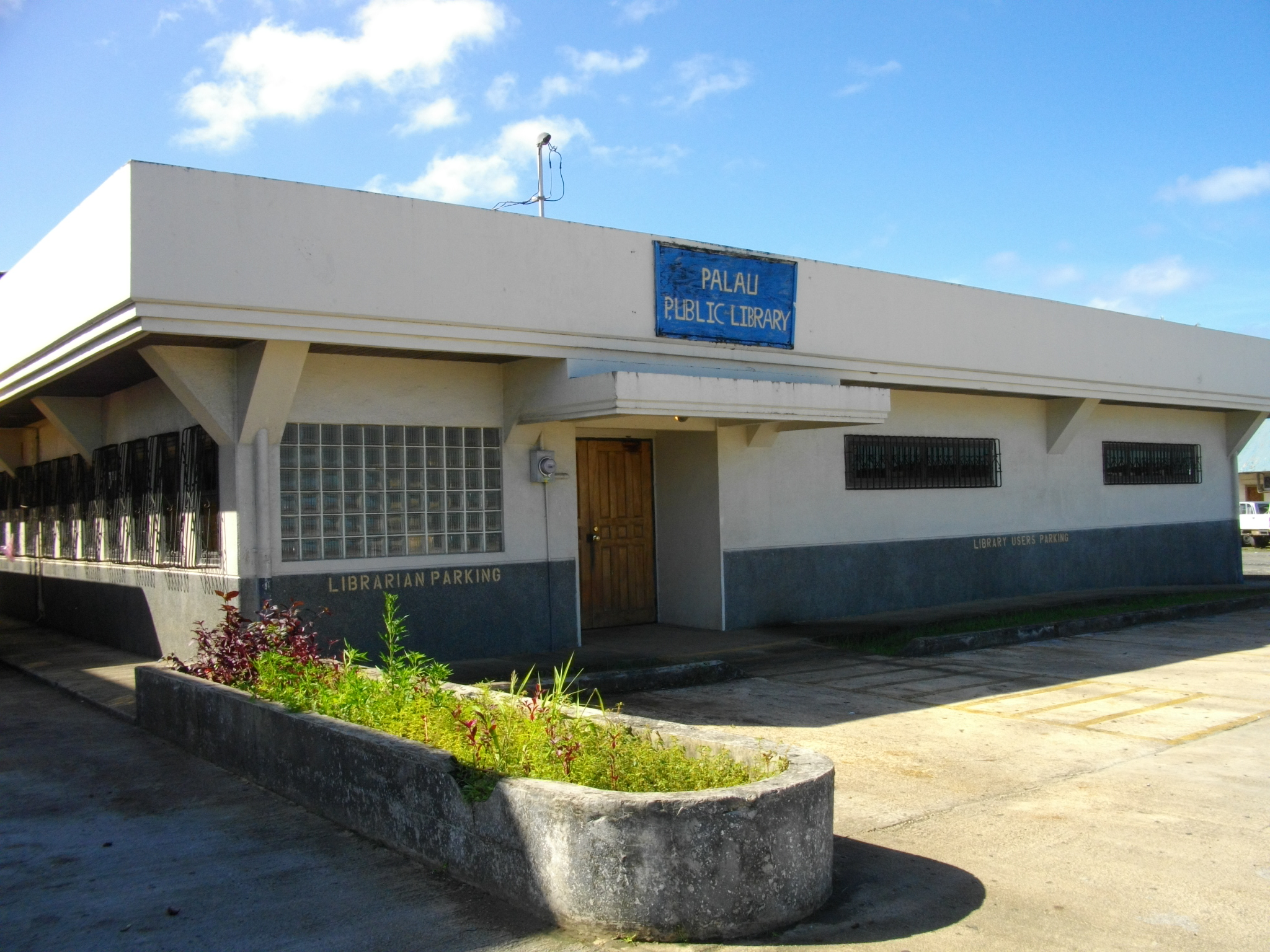
- 7.3411°N 134.4707°E
- Location: Koror, Palau
- Type: Public library

Other information
- Website: Official website

Palau Public Library is the public library of Palau, located in Koror City, Koror.
