= Cowgirl's Prayer =

Studio album by Emmylou Harris
- Released: September 28, 1993
- Recorded: 1993
- Studio: Nashville
- Genre: Country
- Labels: Asylum; Elektra
- Producers: Allen Reynolds, Richard Bennett

Emmylou Harris chronology
At the Ryman (1992)	Cowgirl's Prayer (1993)	Wrecking Ball (1995)

Professional ratings
Review scores
Source	Rating
AllMusic	4/5 stars
Chicago Tribune	4/4 stars
Entertainment Weekly	A+
Los Angeles Times	3.5/4 stars
Orlando Sentinel	4/5 stars
Rolling Stone	3.5/5 stars

Cowgirl's Prayer is the seventeenth studio album by American country artist Emmylou Harris, released on September 28, 1993, by Warner Bros. Records. Coming immediately after 1992's live acoustic At the Ryman album, Cowgirl's Prayer is a collection of similarly subdued material (with a couple of rockers thrown in, notably "High Powered Love", the album's first single). Released at a time when older artists were being dropped from country radio playlists, the album received little airplay, despite positive reviews, and its relative commercial failure is said to have served as a catalyst for Harris's decision to change course with the harder-edged sound of her subsequent work, beginning with 1995's rockish Wrecking Ball, thus rendering Cowgirl's Prayer Harris's last mainstream country album.

Despite the lack of radio airplay, accompanying videos for the album's three singles, "High Powered Love", the Cajun-themed "Crescent City", and Jesse Winchester's "Thanks to You", received considerable exposure on CMT.

The album's name is taken from the first line of the last song, "Say a prayer for the cowgirl". In Leonard Cohen's original song "Ballad of the Absent Mare", the subject is a cowboy, but for Jennifer Warnes' 1987 version Cohen changed the name of the song to "Ballad of the Runaway Horse" and the protagonist to a cowgirl.

== Critical reception ==
Alanna Nash of the Entertainment Weekly, in a A+ review stated, "On Cowgirl's Prayer (Asylum), Harris' 22nd album, she takes the opposite tack. She has simply recorded the best music she could find-commercialism be damned. The result is her finest album in years."

Jack Hurst of the Chicago Tribune in a 3/4 review, "I know: you think you've long since heard what Emmylou has and you now are preoccupied with newer products. Unpreoccupy yourself, unless you want to miss one of the more stunning packages around. Under the ears of producers Allen Reynolds and Richard Bennett, Harris has recorded a riveting collection of songs made all the more memorable by a sound that employs few instruments and yet manages to crash and thunder in the ears."

Teresa Walker of the Associated Press wrote, "Cowgirl's Prayer is a delicious combination of traditional country and haunting ballads spiced with blues and rock and roll for good measure."

Thom Jurek of AllMusic was full of praise claiming, "Cowgirl's Prayer is one of Harris' most emotionally honest and musically satisfying recordings that matches the intensity, diversity, and musical ambition of her earliest works."

The Orlando Sentinel declared, "Cowgirl’s Prayer is a bit uneven, but the high points make it worth negotiating a few rough spots...Harris has made more consistent albums, but even if some of the material on Cowgirl’s Prayer doesn’t quite suit her voice or fit in with the generally quiet mood, most of the tracks show Harris at her best."

Jim Bessman of Rolling Stone in a 3.5/5 stars review remarked, "Though sparingly produced again by Allen Reynolds and Richard Bennett, with the same musicians on hand and additional backups by the likes of Trisha Yearwood, Ashley Cleveland and Alison Krauss, this is an Emmylou Harris album first and foremost. While on Ryman, Harris explored a cross section of styles, the strength of Cowgirl's lies in a typically conscientious, thematic song selection marked by Harris' own return to songwriting."

Randy Lewis of the Los Angeles Times hailed the album saying, "Harris’ biggest strength remains her song selection, and this strong collection focuses mainly on the many facets of faith: the struggle to find it, the ease with which it can be lost, the peace of mind when it is secure. An exceptionally vibrant, thoughtful outing."

== Track listing ==
No.	Title	Writer(s)	Length
1.	"A Ways to Go"	Lainie Marsh	3:38
2.	"The Light"	Kieran Kane, Emmylou Harris	2:29
3.	"High Powered Love"	Tony Joe White	3:08
4.	"You Don't Know Me"	Eddy Arnold, Cindy Walker	3:07
5.	"Prayer in Open D"	Harris	4:17
6.	"Crescent City"	Lucinda Williams	3:31
7.	"Lovin' You Again"	Roger D. Ferris	5:31
8.	"Jerusalem Tomorrow"	David Olney	4:17
9.	"Thanks to You"	Jesse Winchester	3:56
10.	"I Hear a Call"	Tony Arata	2:50
11.	"Ballad of a Runaway Horse"	Leonard Cohen	5:35

== Personnel ==
=== Musicians ===
- Emmylou Harris – acoustic guitar, harmony vocals
- Larry Atamanuik – percussion, drums
- Sam Bacco – percussion
- Grace Bahng – cello
- Richard Bennett – acoustic, tremolo, electric guitar, percussion, tambourine, mandocello, hi-string guitar
- Mike Brignardello – bass
- Lori Brooks – harmony vocals
- Sam Bush – fiddle
- Kathy Chiavola – handclapping, harmony vocals
- Ashley Cleveland – handclapping, harmony vocals
- Suzanne Cox – background vocals
- Emory Gordy, Jr. – string arrangements
- Connie Heard – violin
- David Hoffner – Hammond organ
- Roy Huskey, Jr. – acoustic bass
- Kieran Kane – gut string guitar
- Mary Ann Kennedy – harmony vocals
- Jana King – harmony vocals
- Alison Krauss – background vocals
- Chris Leuzinger – acoustic and electric guitar
- Sam Levine – clarinet, flute
- Joe Loesch – special effects
- Edgar Meyer – double bass
- Al Perkins – pedal steel, steel guitar
- Jon Randall – harmony vocals
- Pam Rose – harmony vocals
- Milton Sledge – percussion, drums
- Jay Spell – piano, accordion
- Hurshel Wiginton – harmony vocals
- Kris Wilkinson – viola
- Dennis Wilson – harmony vocals
- Bobby Wood – organ, electric piano
- Bob Wray – bass
- Trisha Yearwood – handclapping, harmony vocals

=== Others ===
- Richard Aspinwall – assistant engineer
- Richard Bennett – producer
- John Heiden – design
- Robin Lynch – art direction
- Mark Miller – engineer, mixing
- Allen Reynolds – producer
- Tim White – photography

== Chart performance ==
Chart (1993)	Peak position
U.S. Billboard Top Country Albums	34
U.S. Billboard 200	152
Canadian RPM Country Albums	19

== Release history ==
Release history and formats for Cowgirl's Prayer
Region	Date	Format	Label	Ref.
North America	September 28, 1993	CD; cassette	Asylum Records; Elektra Records	
