= Lainey =

- Gender: Primarily female
- Language: English

Origin
- Meaning: Short form of various names

Other names
- Related names: Lainie, Laney, Lanie

Lainey is a usually feminine given name or nickname with multiple origins and multiple spelling variants. In the Anglosphere it originated as a short form of different names, including Helen and its variants Helena and Helene, as well as names such as Magdelena and Delaney, a surname that was in use for girls in the Southern United States as a given name as early as the 1850s. In some instances, Lainey and its spelling variants were used as short forms of the name Elaine, which is an Old French form of the name Helen used for a character in the 15th Century Arthurian romance Le Morte d’Arthur by Thomas Malory. However, the name Elaine was popularized in the Anglosphere by its use by Alfred, Lord Tennyson for a character in his 1859 Arthurian romance Idylls of the King. The name Lainey has been popularized by the fame of television and movie characters and celebrities, most recently by American country western music singer Lainey Wilson. Other well-used spelling variants include Laney, Lainie, and Lanie.

== People with the name ==
- Lainey Keogh (born 1957), an Irish fashion designer
- Lainey Lipson, an actress featured in MyMusic
- Elaine "Lainey" Lui (born 1973), a Canadian television personality
- Lainey Wilson, American singer

== Fictional characters with the name ==
- Lainey Lewis, a character in The Goldbergs
- Dr. Louise Elaine "Lainey" Winters, a character in General Hospital

== See also ==
- Lany (disambiguation)
- Laney (disambiguation)
- Lainie
