= Laney =

Laney may refer to:

- Laney (surname)
- Laney, Georgia, U.S.
- Laney, Wisconsin, U.S.
- Emsley A. Laney High School, a high school near Wilmington, North Carolina
- Lucy Craft Laney High School. a high school in Augusta, Georgia.
- Laney College, a community college in Oakland, California
- Laney Amplification, a British brand of guitar amplifiers and cabinets
- Laney, County Antrim, a townland in County Antrim, Northern Ireland

== People ==
=== Given name ===
- Laney Stewart (born 1966), American musician
- Laney Jones (born 1991), American Singer, songwriter

=== Surname ===
- Kiera Laney (born 2003), American soccer player

== See also ==
- Layne
- Lany (disambiguation)
- Lainey (disambiguation)
- Lainie, a given name
