= Lany =

Lany may refer to:

== Places ==
- Lány (disambiguation), various places in the Czech Republic
- Łany (disambiguation), various places in Poland

== People ==
- Benjamin Lany (1591–1675), English academic and Anglican bishop
- Dorothy May De Lany (1908–1970), New Zealand hotel worker and trade unionist
- Edward Lany (1667–1728), Master of Pembroke College, Cambridge
- Lany Kaligis (born 1949), Indonesian former tennis player
- Thak Lany, Cambodian politician elected in 2003
- Villaney Remengesau (born 1985), nicknamed Lany, Palauan human rights activist

== Music ==
- LANY, an American pop rock band
  - LANY (album), the band's 2017 debut album

== See also ==
- Lány Castle, Lány, Czech Republic, summer residence of the president of the Czech Republic
- Laney (disambiguation)
