= Lány (Havlíčkův Brod District) =

- Municipality
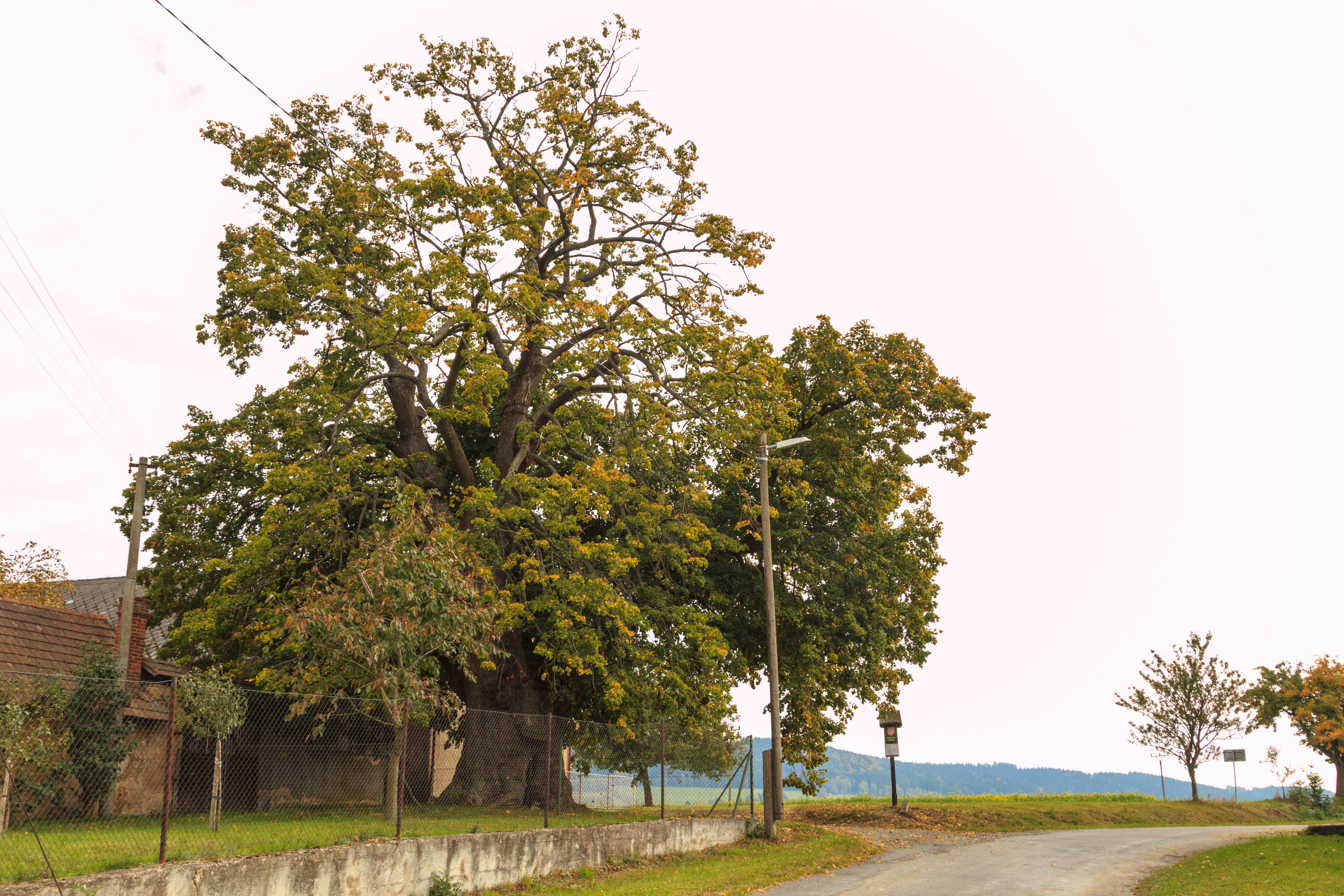
- Memorial tree

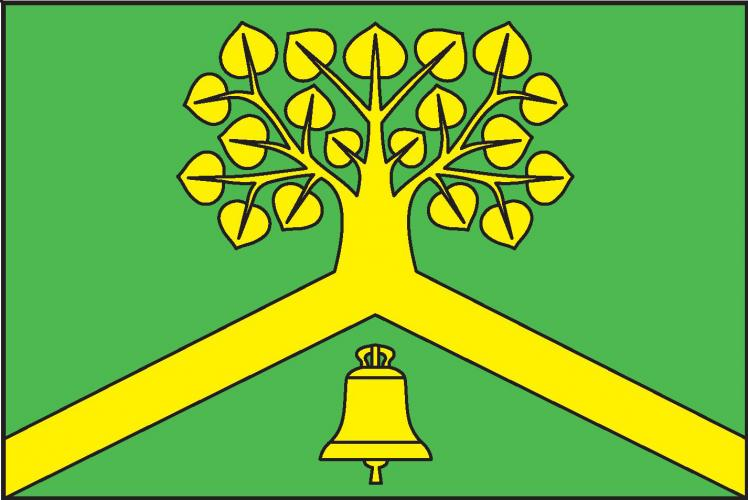
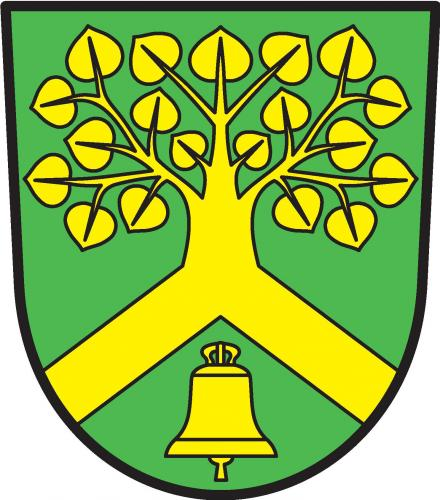
- Flag Coat of arms

- Location in the Czech Republic
- Coordinates: 49°45′34″N 15°42′47″E
- Country: Czech Republic
- Region: Vysočina
- District: Havlíčkův Brod
- First mentioned: 1556

Area
  - Total: 2.04 km^{2} (0.79 sq mi)
- Elevation: 464 m (1,522 ft)

Population (2026-01-01)
  - Total: 60
  - Density: 29/km^{2} (76/sq mi)
- Time zone: UTC+1 (CET)
  - Summer (DST): UTC+2 (CEST)
- Postal code: 583 01
- Website: www.lanyuchotebore.cz

Lány is a municipality and village in Havlíčkův Brod District in the Vysočina Region of the Czech Republic. It has about 60 inhabitants.

Lány lies approximately 20 kilometres (12 mi) north-east of Havlíčkův Brod, 41 km (25 mi) north of Jihlava, and 100 km (62 mi) east of Prague.

== Demographics ==
Historical population
Year	Pop.	±%
1869	249	—
1880	291	+16.9%
1890	244	−16.2%
1900	244	+0.0%
1910	217	−11.1%
1921	221	+1.8%
1930	193	−12.7%
1950	148	−23.3%
1961	137	−7.4%
1970	127	−7.3%
1980	108	−15.0%
1991	87	−19.4%
2001	57	−34.5%
2011	50	−12.3%
2021	54	+8.0%
Source: Censuses
