= Jesse Winchester =

American-Canadian singer-songwriter and producer (1944–2014)

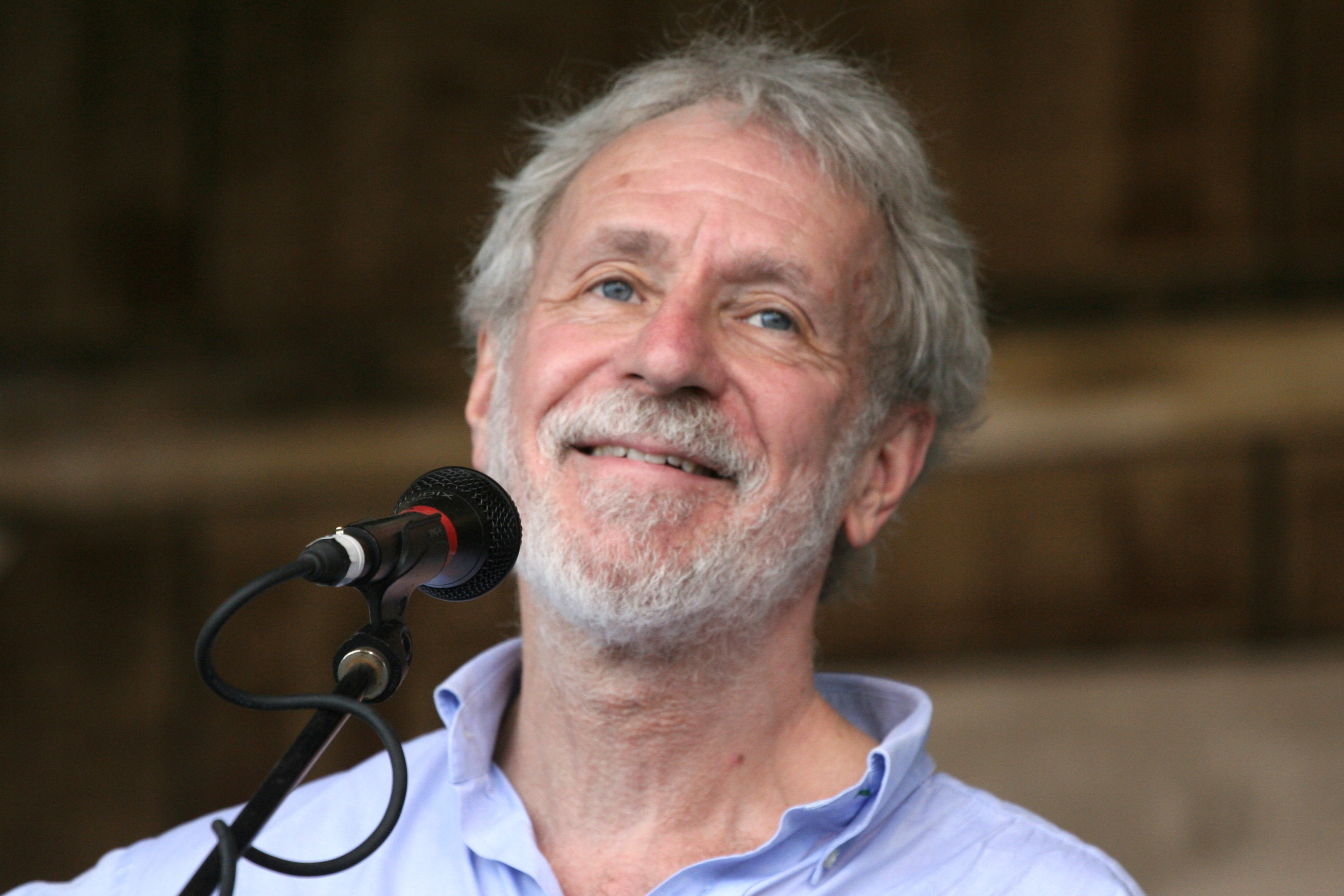
- Winchester in 2011

Background information
- Born: James Ridout Winchester Jr. May 17, 1944; Bossier City, Louisiana, U.S.
- Origin: Memphis, Tennessee, U.S.
- Died: April 11, 2014 (aged 69) Charlottesville, Virginia, U.S.
- Genres: Country; country rock; folk
- Occupations: Musician; songwriter; producer
- Instruments: Vocals; guitar; keyboards
- Years active: Circa 1961 – 2014 (his death)
- Labels: Appleseed; Bearsville; Stony Plain; Ampex; Victor; Sugar Hill; Great Big Island; Wounded Bird; Blue Plate; Warner Bros.
- Website: jessewinchester.com

James Ridout "Jesse" Winchester Jr. (May 17, 1944 – April 11, 2014) was an American-Canadian musician and songwriter. He was born and raised in the southern United States. Opposed to the Vietnam War, he moved to Canada in 1967 to avoid the draft. During that time, he began his career as a solo artist. His highest-charting recordings were "Yankee Lady" in 1970 and "Say What" in 1981. He became a Canadian citizen in 1973, gained amnesty in the U.S. in 1977 and settled in Memphis, Tennessee in 2002.

Winchester's songs were recorded by Patti Page, Elvis Costello, Brewer & Shipley, Jimmy Buffett, Joan Baez, Jerry Garcia, Anne Murray, The Weather Girls, Reba McEntire, the Everly Brothers, Lyle Lovett, Emmylou Harris, George Strait, Gary Allan, Willie Nelson, Jennifer Warnes, Jessi Colter, The Mavericks, Jerry Jeff Walker and Michael Stanley. Some of these recordings achieved chart positions.

== Biography ==
=== Early life ===
Winchester was one of three children born to James Ridout Winchester Sr. (1917–1962) and Frances Ellyn Manire Winchester (1920–2010). He was born at Barksdale Army Air Field, near Bossier City, Louisiana, and raised in northern Mississippi through age 12, when his family relocated to Memphis, Tennessee. He graduated from Christian Brothers High School in Memphis in 1962 as a merit finalist, a National Honor Society member and the salutatorian of his class. He graduated from Williams College, in Williamstown, Massachusetts, in 1966. Upon receiving his draft notice the following year, Winchester moved to Montreal, Quebec, Canada, to avoid the draft.

Winchester began his career in Germany. Upon arriving in Quebec in 1967, he joined a local band, Les Astronautes. He began writing songs, which he performed as a solo artist at the Montreal Folk Workshop and at coffeehouses throughout eastern Canada. Discovered by the Band's Robbie Robertson, Winchester released his album Jesse Winchester, produced by Robertson. He toured Canada, opening for the Band.

=== Career ===
Winchester released albums in the 1970s, but was unable to support the albums by touring in the U.S. because of his status of being a draft resister.

A prolific songwriter, Winchester's songs include "Yankee Lady", "The Brand New Tennessee Waltz", "Mississippi, You're on My Mind", "A Showman's Life","Biloxi", "That's a Touch I Like", and "Every Word You Say".

Upon his election in 1976, President Jimmy Carter granted amnesty to draft evaders, except those who had become citizens of other countries. Although Winchester had become a Canadian citizen, Barry Bozeman, his manager, convinced Carter to allow Winchester amnesty.

On June 10, Winchester appeared with Little Feat, Emmylou Harris and Bonnie Raitt on Burt Sugarman's The Midnight Special.

In 1981, he had his first Top 40 U.S. hit single, "Say What", which earned No. 32 on the Billboard Hot 100. The single was from his Bearsville Records album release, "Talk Memphis".

"I'm Gonna Miss You, Girl", written by Winchester, was recorded by American country music artist Michael Martin Murphey and released in October 1987, as the lead single from the album River of Time. The song peaked at number 3 on the Billboard Hot Country Singles chart and at number 4 on the Canadian RPM Country Tracks chart.

=== Later career ===
Winchester was nominated for the Best Country Male Vocalist award at the Juno Awards of 1990. In 2002, he moved back to Memphis with his girlfriend, Cindy. That year, his song "Step by Step", from the album Let the Rough Side Drag, was used as background music for the montage that ended the first season of the television program The Wire. He received a Lifetime Achievement Award from the American Society of Composers, Authors and Publishers in 2007. Winchester continued to record and perform throughout the U.S. and Canada, releasing his 10th studio album, Love Filling Station, in 2009.

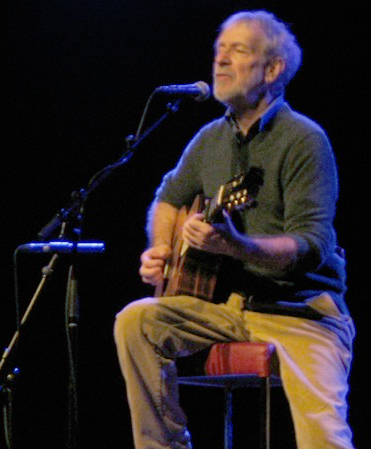
Winchester at the 2011 Blue Highways festival in Utrecht, the Netherlands

On April 11, 2014, Winchester died from bladder cancer in his sleep at his home. He was 69 years old. He was survived by his wife, Cindy, and three children from a previous marriage: James, Alice and Marcus Lee.

Quiet About It, a tribute record to Winchester, was released in 2012, featuring 11 artists, including James Taylor, Lyle Lovett, Lucinda Williams, Rosanne Cash and Jimmy Buffett.

Winchester's final CD, A Reasonable Amount of Trouble, was released in September 2014, with liner notes by Jimmy Buffett. It was nominated for two Grammy awards.

== Discography ==
=== Albums ===
Year	Album	Chart Positions	
Year	Album	CAN	US
1970	Jesse Winchester	26	—
1972	Third Down, 110 to Go	34	193
1974	Learn to Love It	—	—
1976	Let the Rough Side Drag	—	210
1977	Nothing but a Breeze	—	115
1977	Live at the Bijou Cafe	—	—
1978	A Touch on the Rainy Side	—	156
1981	Talk Memphis	—	188
1988	Humour Me	—	—
1989	The Best of Jesse Winchester	—	—
1999	Anthology	—	—
1999	Gentleman of Leisure	—	—
2001	Live from Mountain Stage	—	—
2005	Live	—	—
2009	Love Filling Station	—	—
2014	A Reasonable Amount of Trouble	—	—

=== Singles ===
Year	Single	Chart Positions				Album
Year	Single	CAN	CAN AC	CAN Country	US	Album
1970	"Yankee Lady"	20	8	—	—	Jesse Winchester
1970	"Quiet About It" / "Biloxi"	—	—	—	—	Jesse Winchester
1973	"Isn't That So"	34	21	—	—	Third Down, 110 to Go
1974	"L'air De La Louisiane" / "Laisse Les Bons"	—	—	—	—	Learn To Love It
1974	"Third Rate Romance" / "Mississippi, You're On My Mind"	—	—	—	—	Learn To Love It
1976	"Let the Rough Side Drag"	—	—	42	—	Let the Rough Side Drag
1977	"Nothing but a Breeze"	72	—	—	86	Nothing but a Breeze
1978	"Sassy"	—	45	—	—	A Touch on the Rainy Side
1979	"A Touch on the Rainy Side"	—	42	—	—	A Touch on the Rainy Side
1981	"Say What"	23	13	—	32	Talk Memphis
1989	"Want to Mean Something to You"	81	—	50	—	Humour Me
1989	"Well-a-Wiggy"	—	—	68	—	Humour Me

=== Appearances ===
Year	Album	Song
2003	Beautiful: A Tribute to Gordon Lightfoot	"Sundown"
