= Lány u Dašic =

- Municipality
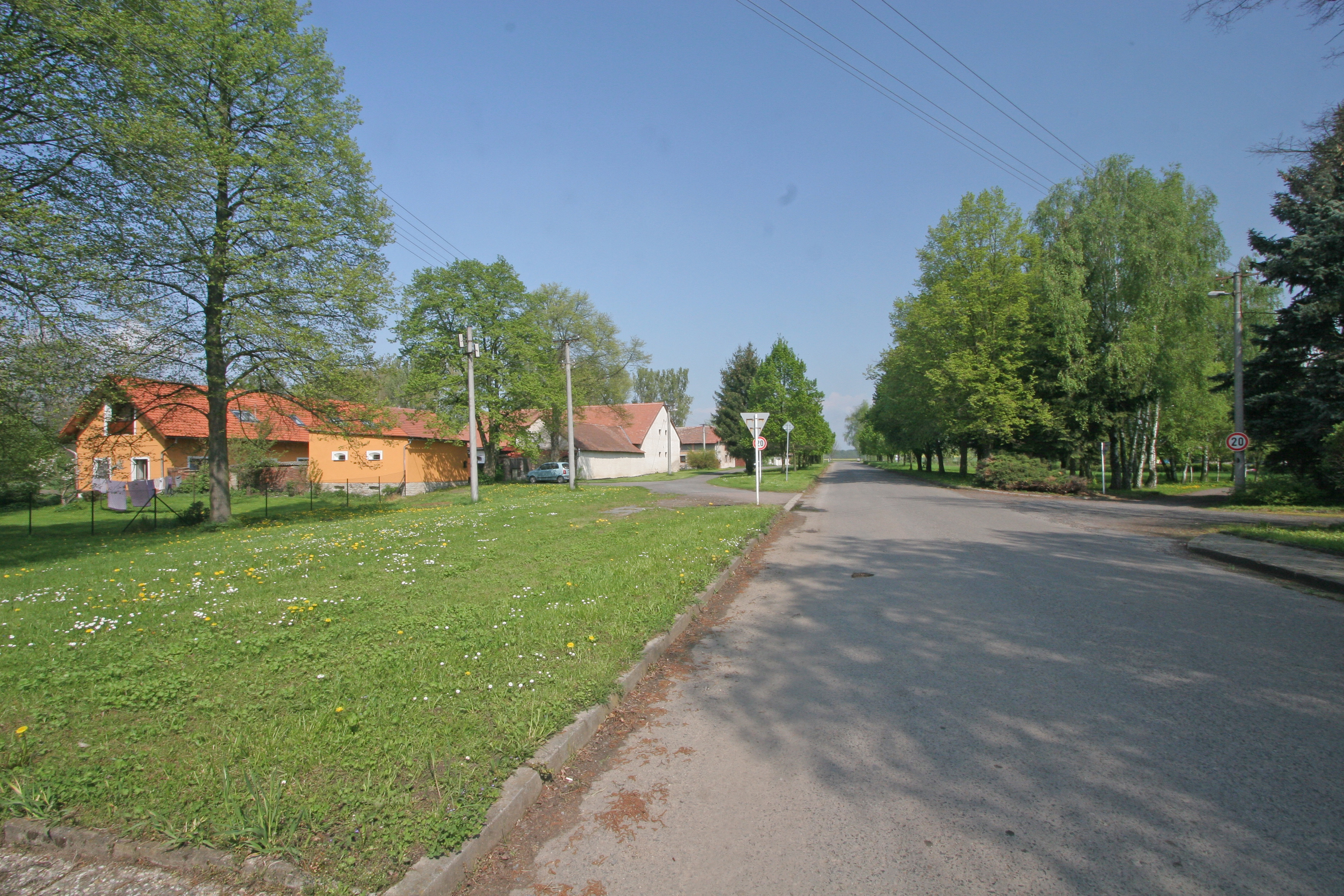
- Centre of Lány u Dašic

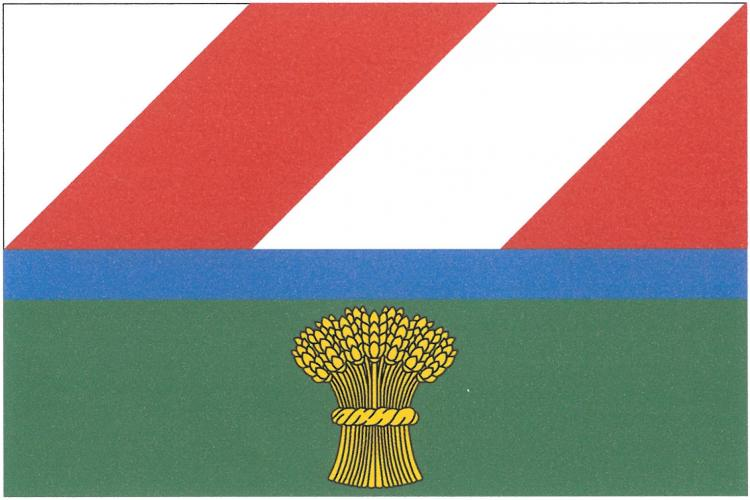
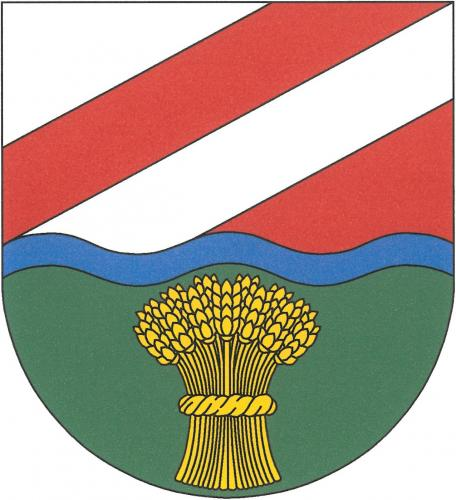
- Flag Coat of arms

- Location in the Czech Republic
- Coordinates: 50°2′37″N 15°53′21″E
- Country: Czech Republic
- Region: Pardubice
- District: Pardubice
- First mentioned: 1452

Area
  - Total: 3.57 km^{2} (1.38 sq mi)
- Elevation: 224 m (735 ft)

Population (2026-01-01)
  - Total: 150
  - Density: 42/km^{2} (110/sq mi)
- Time zone: UTC+1 (CET)
  - Summer (DST): UTC+2 (CEST)
- Postal code: 530 02
- Website: www.lanyudasic.cz

Lány u Dašic is a municipality and village in Pardubice District in the Pardubice Region of the Czech Republic. It has about 200 inhabitants.

== Demographics ==
Historical population
Year	Pop.	±%
1869	244	—
1880	287	+17.6%
1890	265	−7.7%
1900	251	−5.3%
1910	276	+10.0%
1921	334	+21.0%
1930	283	−15.3%
1950	160	−43.5%
1961	133	−16.9%
1970	136	+2.3%
1980	130	−4.4%
1991	132	+1.5%
2001	132	+0.0%
2011	150	+13.6%
2021	136	−9.3%
Source: Censuses
