= Villaney Remengesau =

Palauan human rights activist (born 1985)

- Born: 30 March 1985 (age 40); Koror, Palau
- Occupation: Disability rights activist
- Organization: OMEKESANG
- Partner: 1
- Awards: Palau Media Center Most Impactful Person of the Year (2024)

Villaney "Lany" Remengesau (born 30 March 1985) is a Palauan human rights activist. She is known for her advocacy for people with disabilities in Palau and the wider Asia–Pacific region, which led to her being named the Most Impactful Person in Palau in 2024 by the Palau Media Centre.

== Biography ==
Remengesau was born in Koror, Palau, of Palauan and Asian heritage. She has a physical impairment and uses a wheelchair. She studied business management at university, and is married with a child.

Remengesau has had several leadership and advisory roles in the development of disability organisations and services in Palau. She played a role in the revival of the OMEKESANG, a non-governmental organisation that advocated for the rights of people with disabilities in Palau, and served as its leader from 2011 until 2020. Under her leadership, OMEKESANG gained full membership of international disability rights networks, including the Pacific Disability Forum, Asia Pacific DPO United, and Disabled Persons International. Remengesau was also a board member of Palau Parents Empowered, which supported the parents of children with disabilities, as well as the Palau Severely Disabled Assistance Fund, which provided financial support to people with disabilities and their families experiencing financial hardship. Remengesau also served as the president of the Belau Association of Non-Governmental Organisations between 2018 and 2020.

Remengesau has acted as a disability inclusion consultant for the Palau Ministry of Health and Human Services. She advocated for the passing of legislation that ensured human rights for people with disabilities, and helped shape what would become the Rights of Persons with Disabilities Act, which was signed into law by Surangel Whipps Jr., the President of Palau, on 30 September 2024. She also worked with the Palau Resource Institute, supporting with the preservation of Palau's environment and cultural heritage through sustainable practices, and as part of the government's Ad-Hoc Climate Change Committee contributed to the 2015 report Palau Climate Change Policy for Climate and Disaster Resilient Low Emissions Development.

Regionally, Remengesau served as the co-chair of the Pacific Disability Forum between 2018 and 2023, having previously been a board member from 2011 until 2015. She was also a member of the Pacific Community Based Inclusive Development Committee and part of the disability constituency for the Asia Pacific Regional Civil Society Engagement Mechanism on Sustainable Development between 2019 and 2023.

Internationally, in 2019 Remengesau spoke at the United Nations High Level Political Forum on Sustainable Development addressing its proposed Sustainable Development Goals, as part of Palau's Voluntary National Review Report team. She highlighted the importance of incorporating accessibility and inclusion within these goals. Remengesau successfully lobbied the Palauan government to ratify the United Nations Convention of the Rights of Persons with Disabilities. Remengesau has worked as a disability inclusion consultant for the UN Country Team in the Pacific and the Resident Coordinator Office in Suva, Fiji.

In 2024, Remengesau was named the Palau Media Centre's Most Impactful Person of the Year for her "unwavering dedication to advocating for the rights and inclusion of persons with disabilities".
