= Kozojedy (Jičín District) =

- Municipality
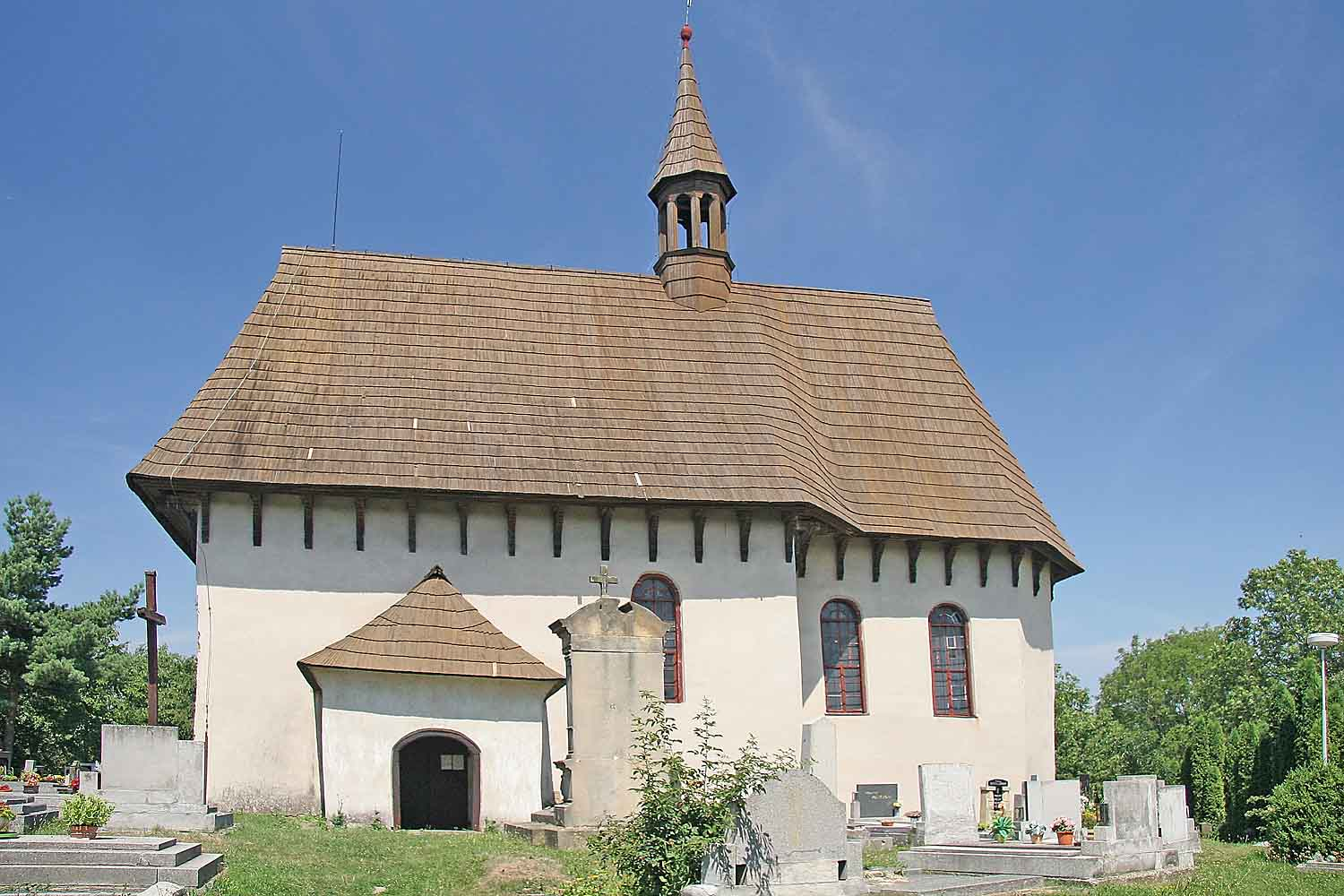
- Church of Saint Wenceslaus

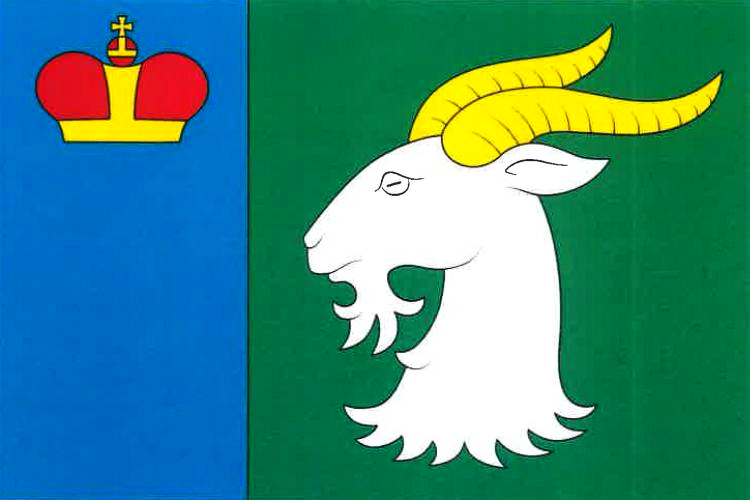
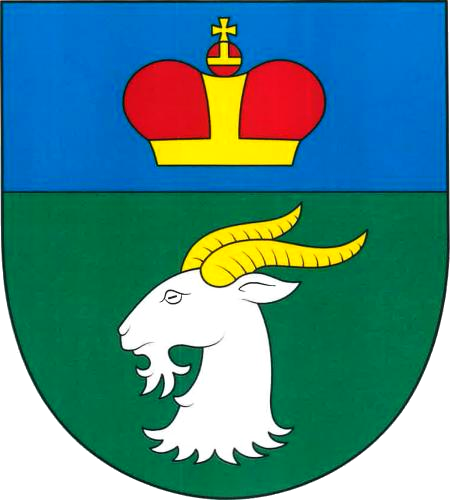
- Flag Coat of arms

- Location in the Czech Republic
- Coordinates: 50°18′59″N 15°22′29″E
- Country: Czech Republic
- Region: Hradec Králové
- District: Jičín
- First mentioned: 1369

Area
  - Total: 3.67 km^{2} (1.42 sq mi)
- Elevation: 272 m (892 ft)

Population (2026-01-01)
  - Total: 164
  - Density: 44.7/km^{2} (116/sq mi)
- Time zone: UTC+1 (CET)
  - Summer (DST): UTC+2 (CEST)
- Postal code: 507 03
- Website: www.kozojedy.com

Kozojedy is a municipality and village in Jičín District in the Hradec Králové Region of the Czech Republic. It has about 200 inhabitants.

== Demographics ==
Historical population
Year	Pop.	±%
1869	333	—
1880	342	+2.7%
1890	356	+4.1%
1900	326	−8.4%
1910	388	+19.0%
1921	420	+8.2%
1930	428	+1.9%
1950	331	−22.7%
1961	340	+2.7%
1970	286	−15.9%
1980	233	−18.5%
1991	210	−9.9%
2001	199	−5.2%
2011	183	−8.0%
2021	179	−2.2%
Source: Censuses
