= Červené Janovice =

- Municipality
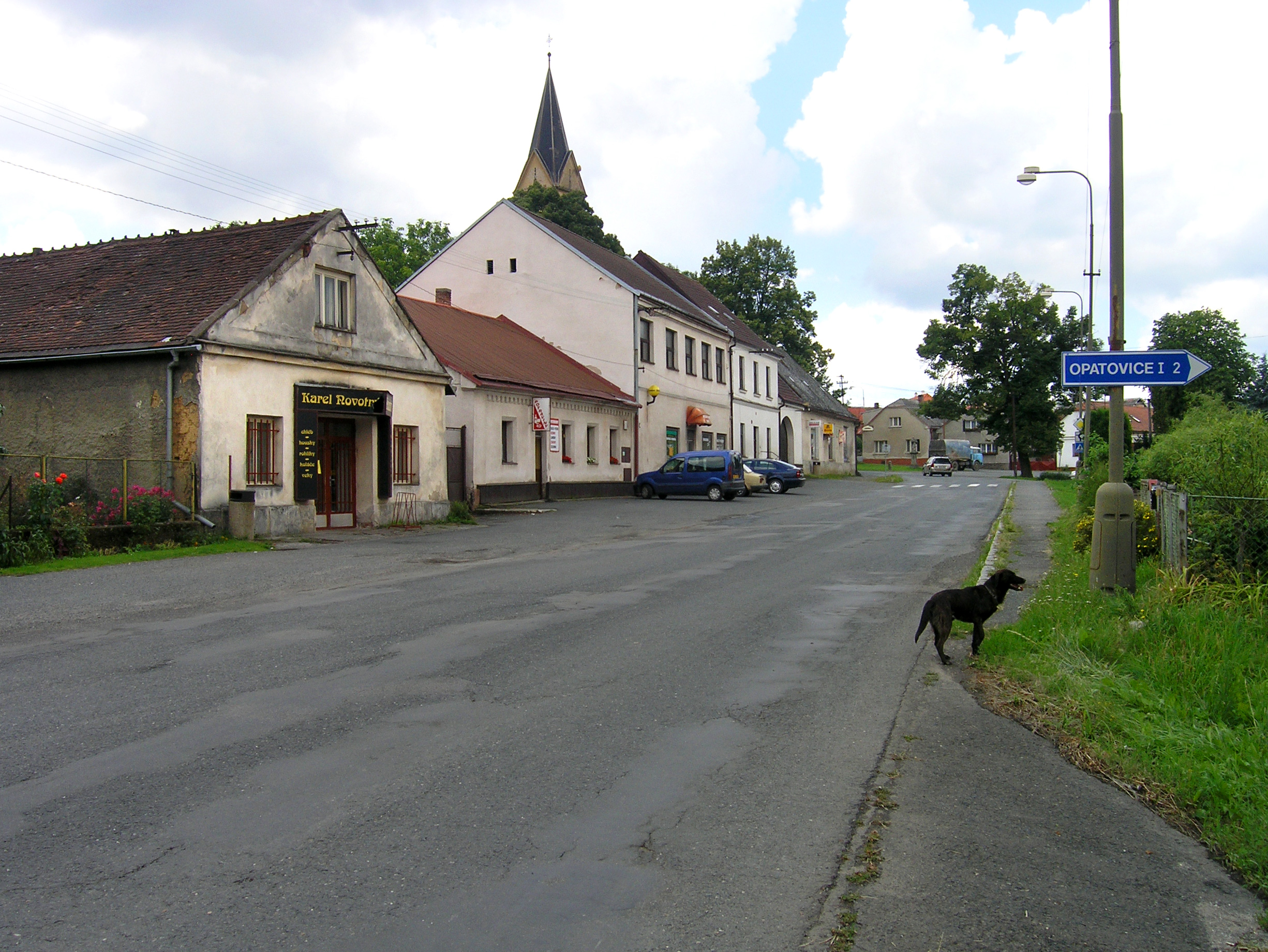
- Main street

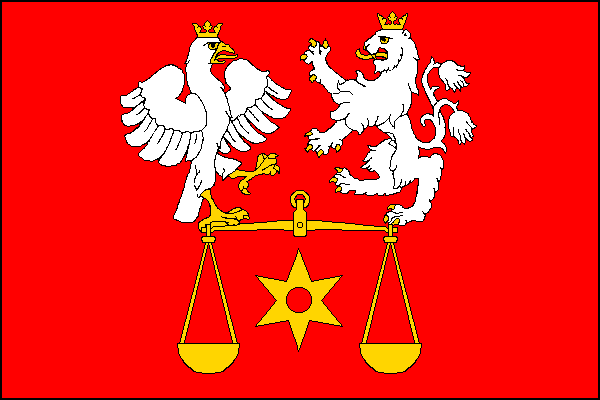
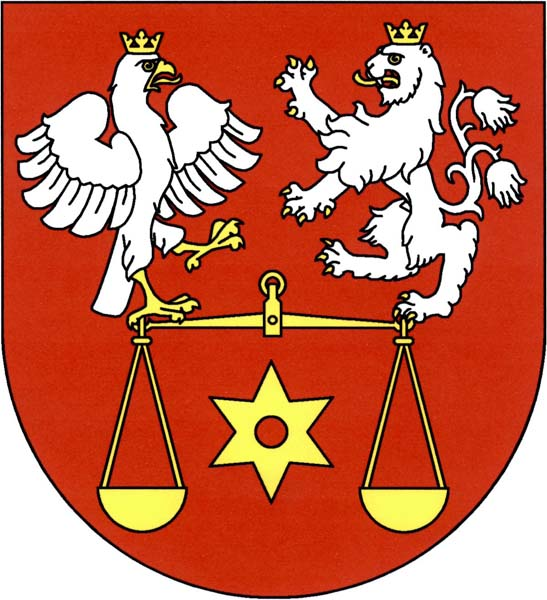
- Flag Coat of arms

- Location in the Czech Republic
- Coordinates: 49°50′5″N 15°15′12″E
- Country: Czech Republic
- Region: Central Bohemian
- District: Kutná Hora
- First mentioned: 1352

Area
  - Total: 14.98 km^{2} (5.78 sq mi)
- Elevation: 442 m (1,450 ft)

Population (2026-01-01)
  - Total: 656
  - Density: 43.8/km^{2} (113/sq mi)
- Time zone: UTC+1 (CET)
  - Summer (DST): UTC+2 (CEST)
- Postal code: 285 42
- Website: www.cervenejanovice.cz

Červené Janovice (German: Roth Janowitz) is a municipality and village in Kutná Hora District in the Central Bohemian Region of the Czech Republic. It has about 700 inhabitants.

== Administrative division ==
Červené Janovice consists of seven municipal parts (in brackets population according to the 2021 census):

- Červené Janovice (506)
- Chvalov (6)
- Lány (32)
- Plhov (3)
- Vilémovice (43)
- Zadní (4)
- Zhoř (47)

== Etymology ==
The name Janovice is derived from the personal name Jan, meaning "the village of Jan's people". In the 16th–18th centuries, the village was called Janovičky (a diminutive of Janovice) to distinguish it from Uhlířské Janovice. From the 18th century, it has been called Červené Janovice ('red Janovice'), which referred to the colour of its coat of arms.

== Geography ==
Červené Janovice is located about 13 kilometres (8 mi) south of Kutná Hora and 57 km (35 mi) southeast of Prague. It lies in the Upper Sázava Hills. The municipal territory is rich in fishponds, supplied by minor watercourses.

== History ==
The first written mention of Červené Janovice is from 1352. From 1724, the village was owned by the town of Kutná Hora.

== Demographics ==
Historical population

Year	Pop.	±%
1869	1,474	—
1880	1,429	−3.1%
1890	1,268	−11.3%
1900	1,230	−3.0%
1910	1,190	−3.3%

Year	Pop.	±%
1921	1,130	−5.0%
1930	1,026	−9.2%
1950	886	−13.6%
1961	865	−2.4%
1970	803	−7.2%

Year	Pop.	±%
1980	750	−6.6%
1991	735	−2.0%
2001	721	−1.9%
2011	677	−6.1%
2021	641	−5.3%

Source: Censuses

== Transport ==
There are no railways or major roads passing through the municipality.

== Sights ==
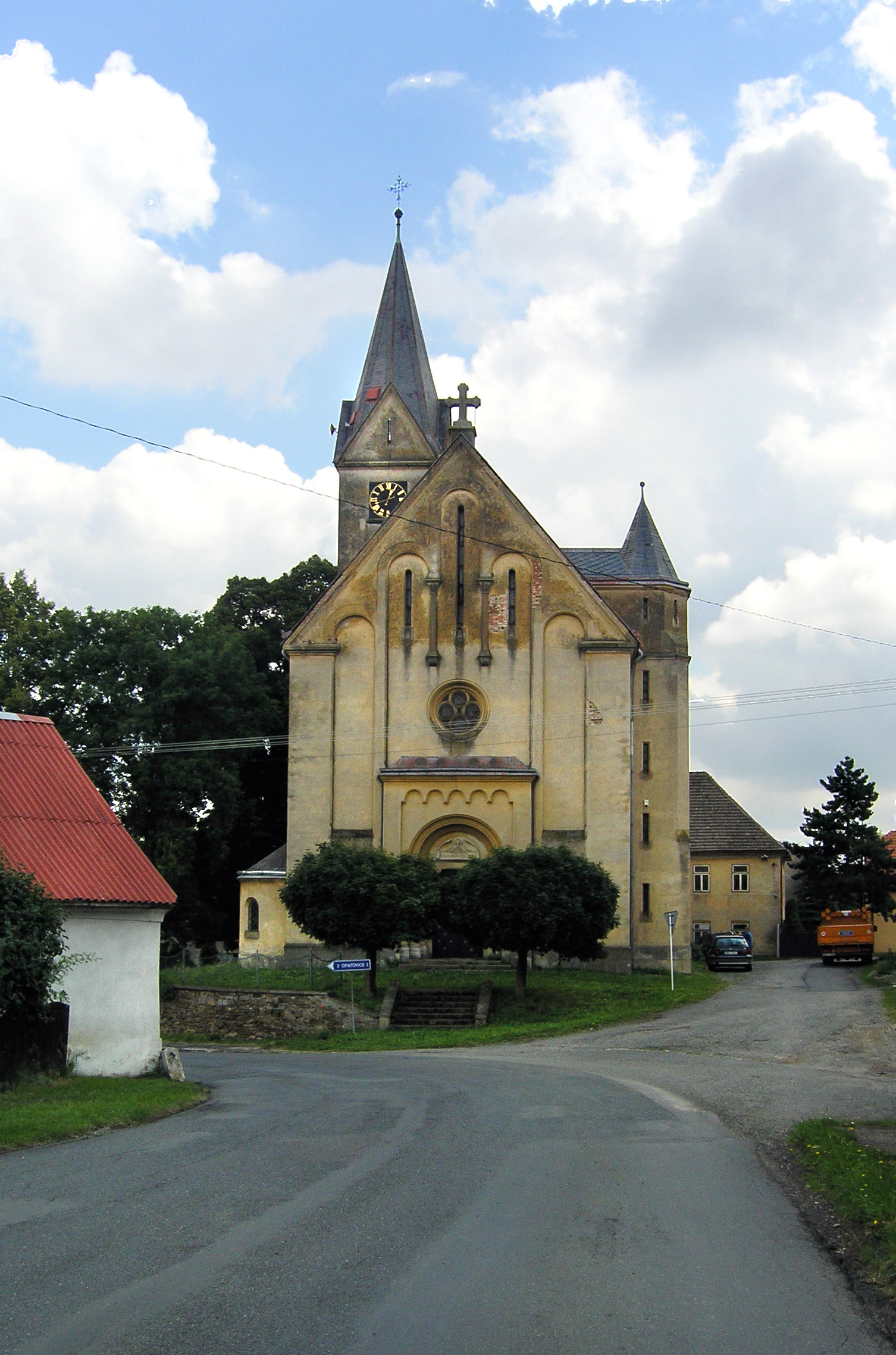
Church of Saint Martin

Among the most important monuments is the Červené Janovice Castle. It was originally a Gothic fortress, rebuilt in the Renaissance style in the early 17th century, then it was rebuilt into the early Baroque castle in 1646–1660.

The Church of Saint Martin was built in the Neo-Romanesque style in 1909–1911.

The Church of the Nativity of the Virgin Mary is located in Vilémovice. It was originally a late Romanesque building from the second half of the 13th century, reconstructed in the 18th and 19th centuries.
