= Koror (city) =

Largest city and commercial centre of Palau

- City
- City of Koror
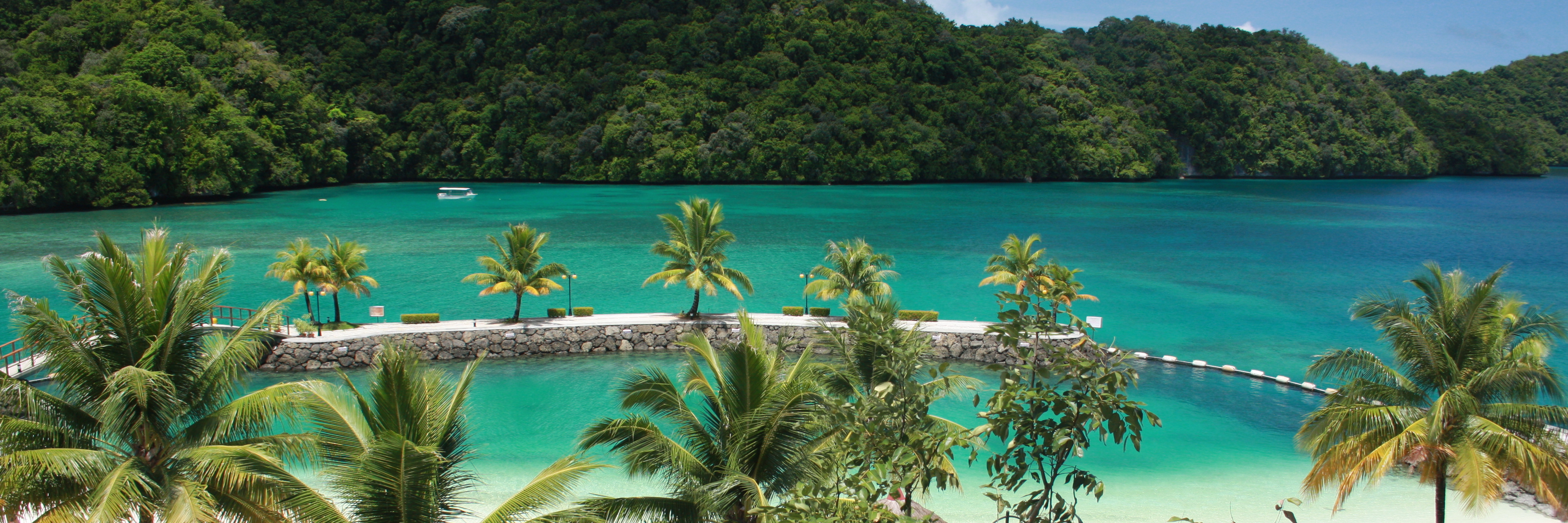
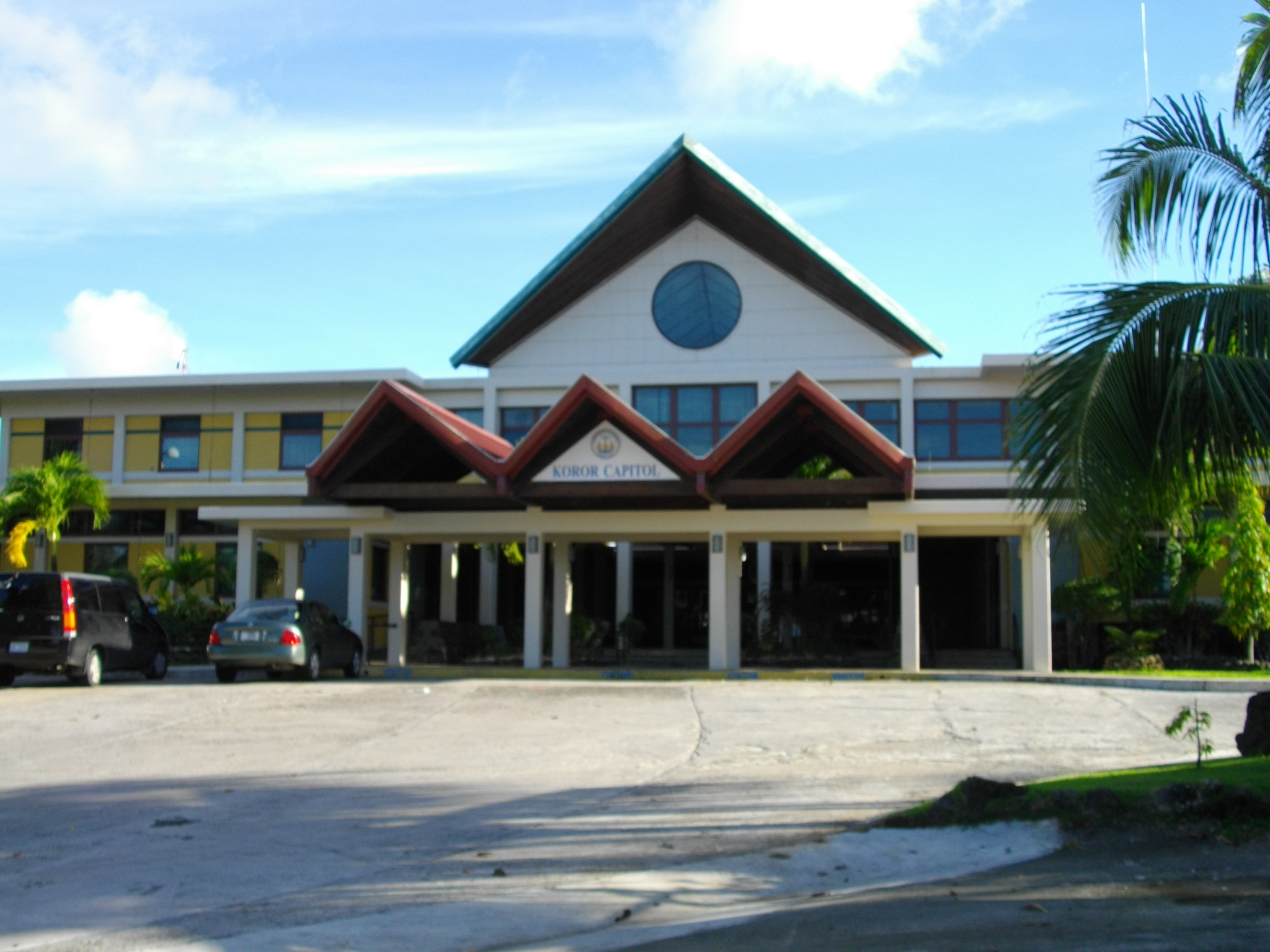
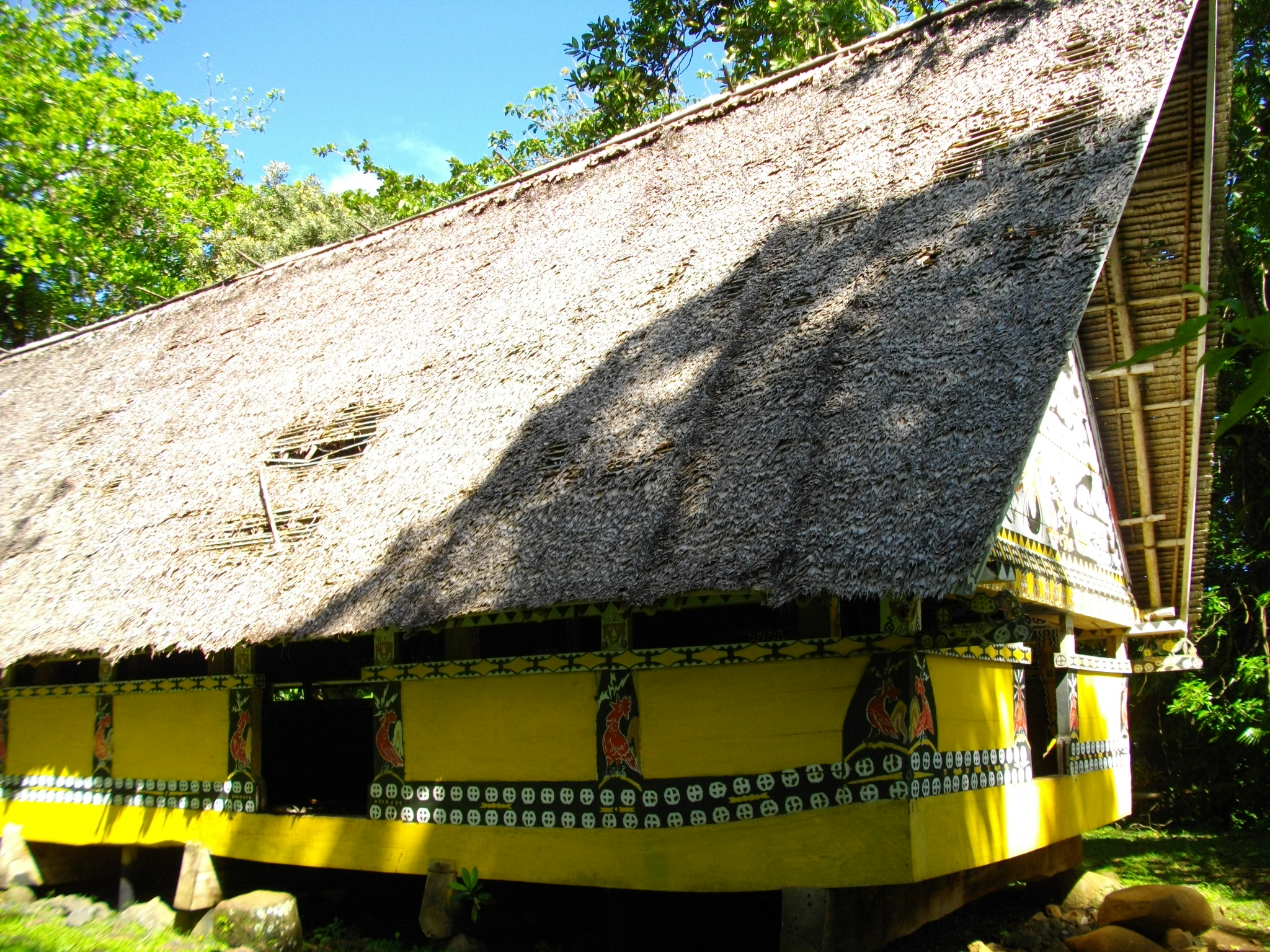
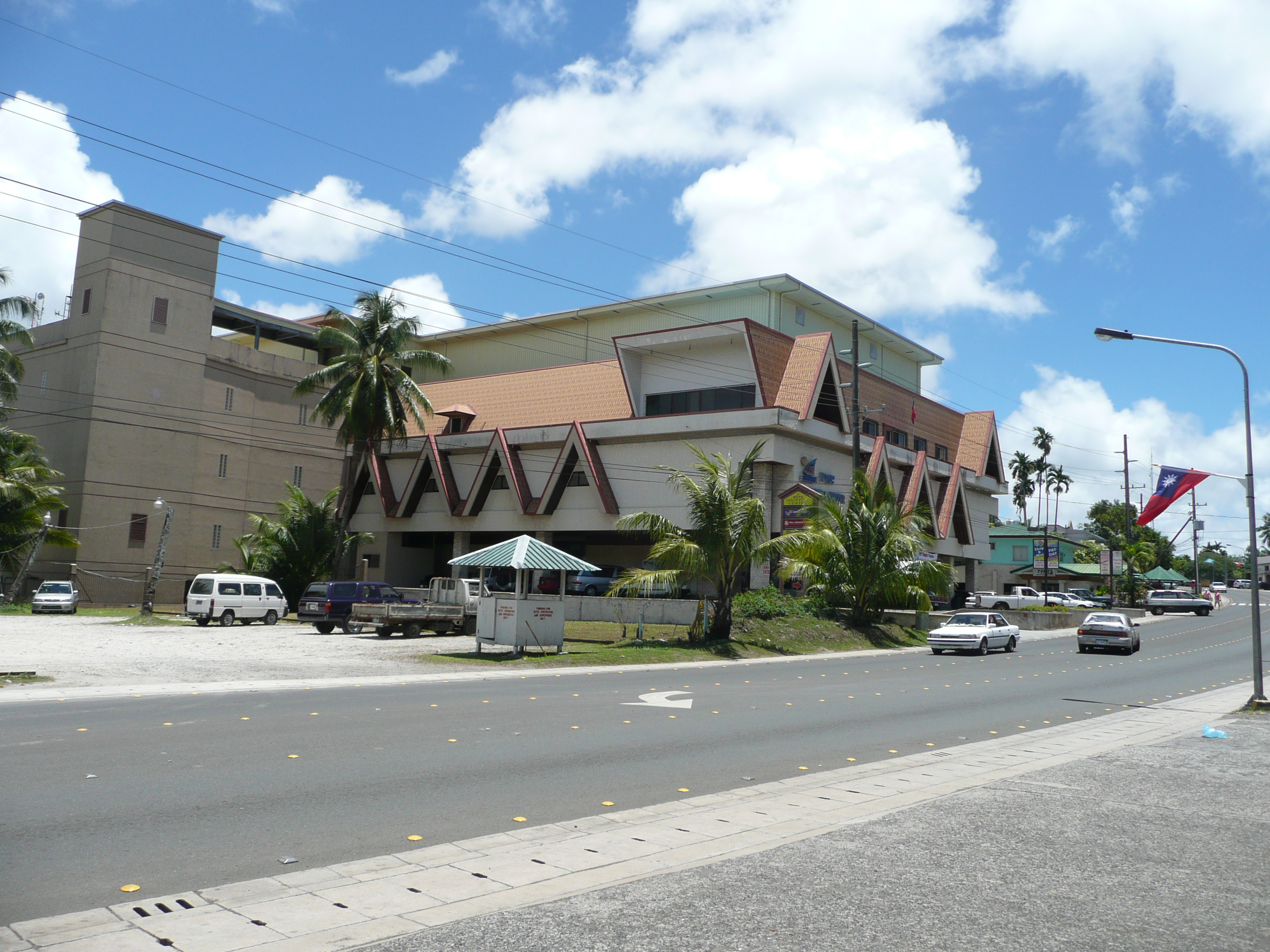
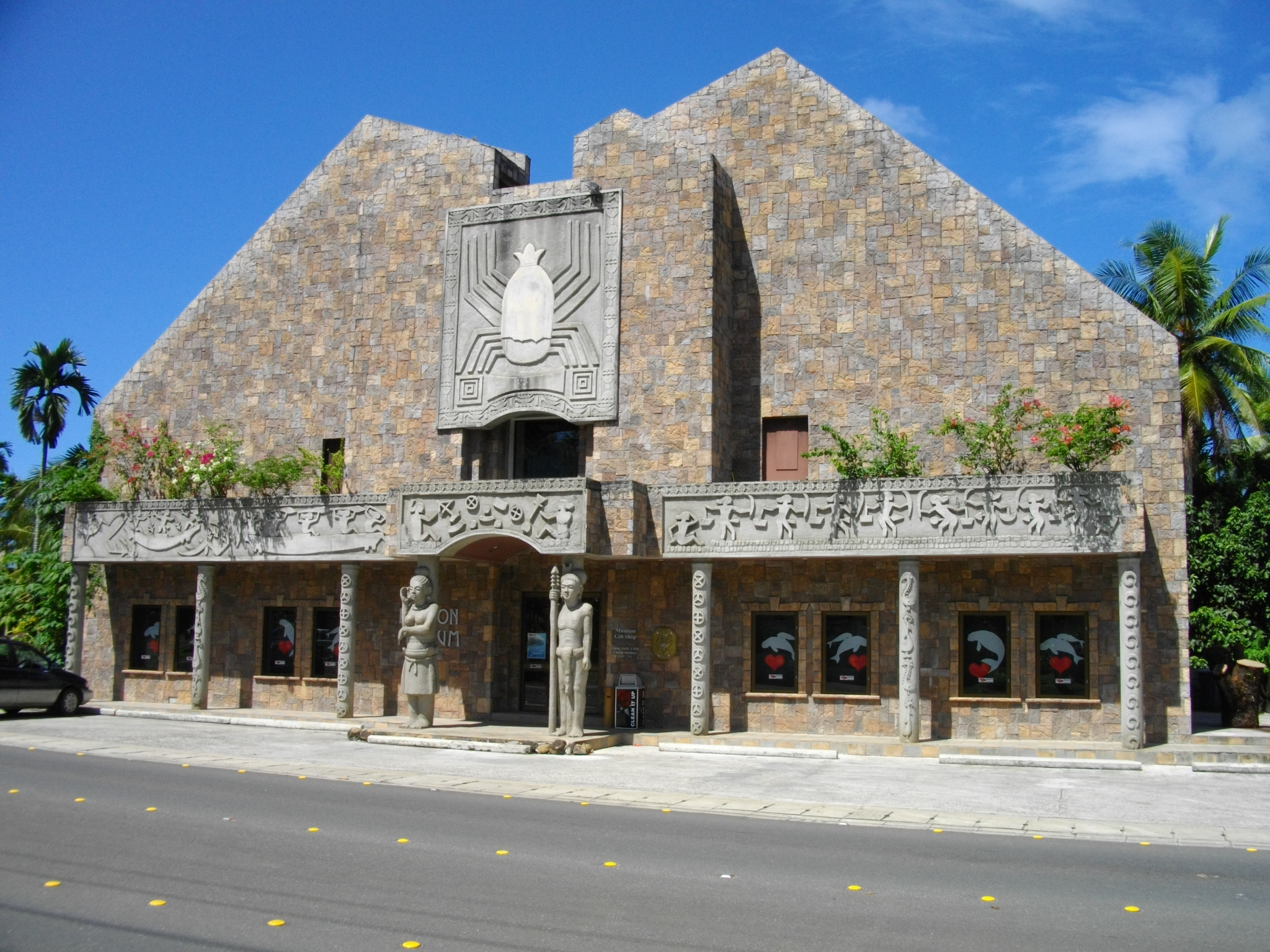
- Top: Koror coastline; Middle: Koror State Government Building, Belau National Museum; WCTC Shopping Center, Etpison Museum

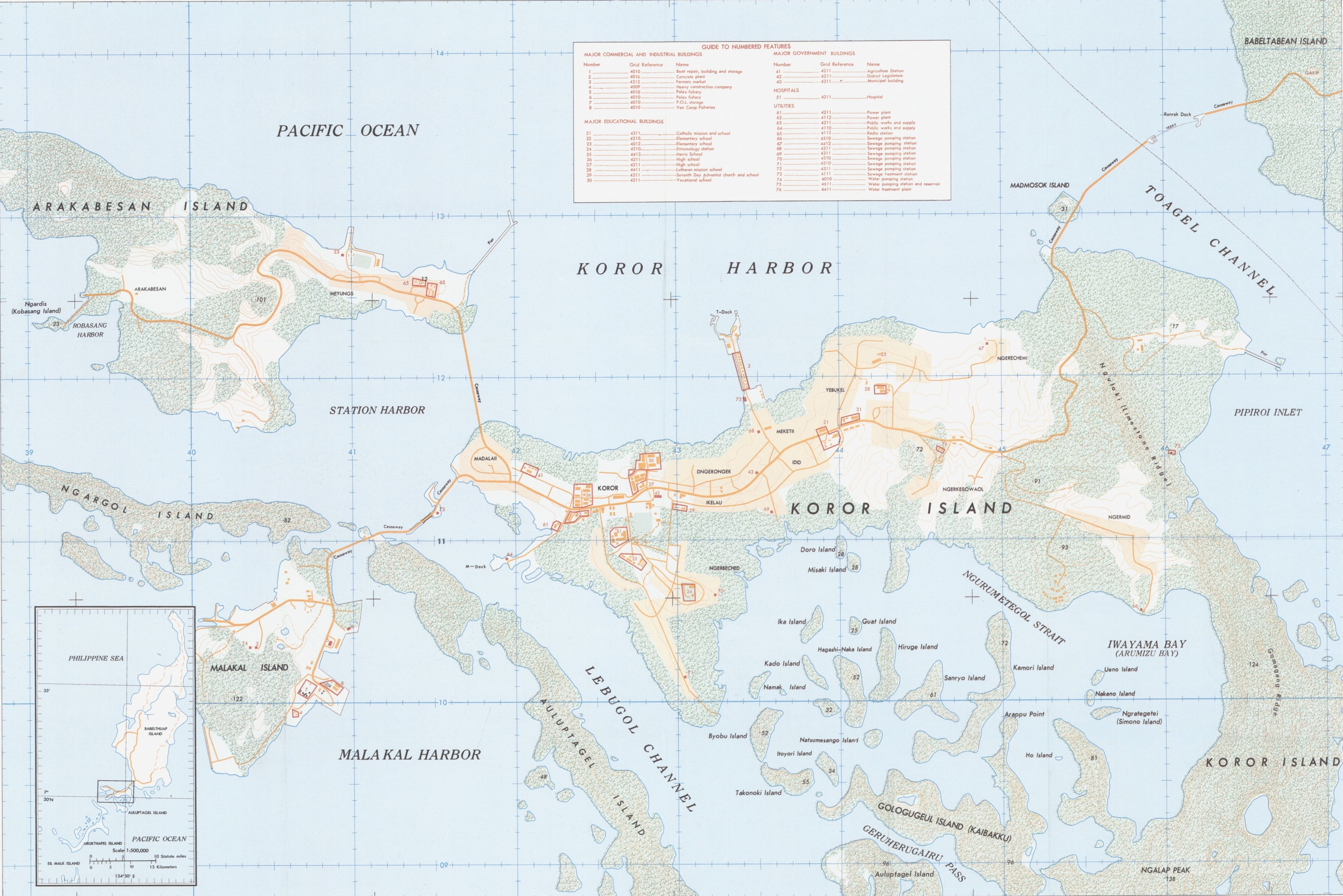
- Location within Koror state

- Location in Palau
- Coordinates: 7°20.5167′N 134°28.75′E
- Country: Palau
- State: Koror
- Founded: 1866

Area
  - Total: 8.0 km^{2} (3.1 sq mi)

Population (2024 estimate)
  - Total: 12,676
  - Density: 1,600/km^{2} (4,100/sq mi)
- Time zone: UTC+9 (Palau Standard Time)
- Area code: (+680) 488

Koror (English: /ˈkɔːˌrɔːr/, KAW-rawr;) is the largest city and the commercial centre of Palau, located on Koror Island (also called Oreor Island). With a population of 12,676 as of 2024, it is home to about half of the country's population.

== History ==
Images of Koror during the Japanese period

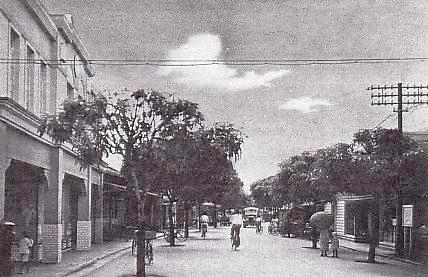

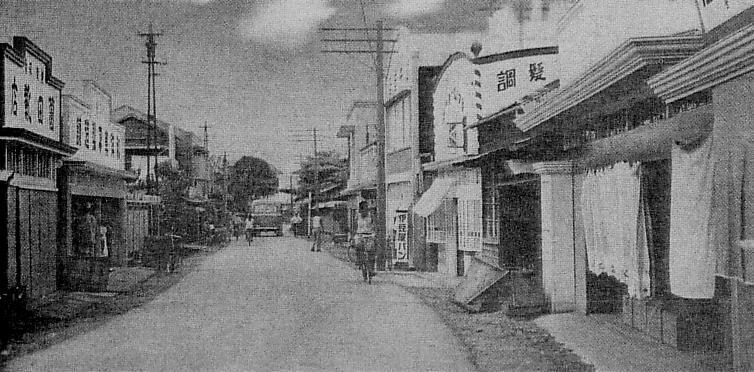

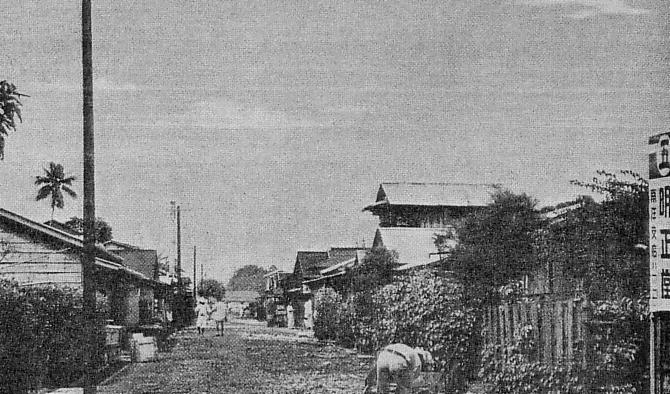

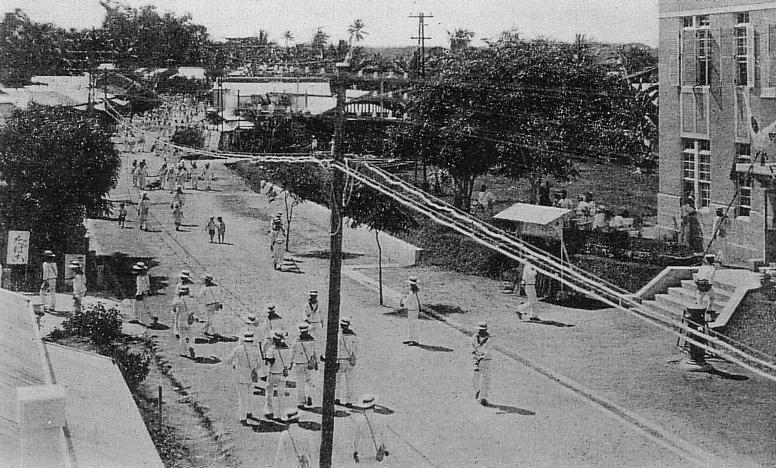

Koror was the administrative centre of the South Seas Mandate of the Japanese Empire. Koror expanded during Japanese rule from a village of a few hundred people in 1920 to a centre of governance and trade with over 2,000 people by the 1930s. A Shinto shrine was completed in November 1940.

The native Palauan population of Koror was sent to Aimeliik in 1943, and Aimeliik became known as the Second Koror. The city was never invaded during World War II. The Japanese military abandoned Koror in favour of Aimeliik after a bombing raid in 1944, while most of the civilian population fled to Babeldaob.

Parts of the city were destroyed by American aerial bombardment during the war, and after the United States occupied the city they burnt or tore down the remainder of the city, leaving only a few buildings for the occupation forces.

== Geography ==
In 1993, Koror was home to more than 7,000 people, but in the recent past the number was at times even greater as large numbers of people from other areas would stay in Koror to conduct business. The town is composed of ten hamlets where traditional roots are strong. Koror sprawls across the western end of Oreor Island along a low ridge. This is the volcanic island half of Oreor; the rock island half is, like most of the rock islands, uninhabited.

== Economy ==
Koror is the main tourist destination in Palau and has many resorts, nightclubs, restaurants, and hotels. The government is also a large employer in the city. Tuna export and copra production are two other economic activities of the city.

The Palau Continental Hotel in Koror was the first tourist hotel in Palau although its 56 rooms were less than the 184 room and 200 room hotels in Saipan and Guam.

=== Climate ===
Koror has a tropical rainforest climate (Köppen Af). The number of days with temperatures above 90 °F rose from 46 per year between 1952 and 1961, to 100 per year from 2009 to 2018. The number of nights with temperatures below 74 °F fell from 40 per year from 1952 to 1961, to 13 from 2009 to 2018.

Climate data for Palau
Month	Jan	Feb	Mar	Apr	May	Jun	Jul	Aug	Sep	Oct	Nov	Dec	Year
Mean daily maximum °C (°F)	30.6 (87.1)	30.6 (87.1)	30.9 (87.6)	31.3 (88.3)	31.4 (88.5)	31.0 (87.8)	30.6 (87.1)	30.7 (87.3)	30.9 (87.6)	31.1 (88.0)	31.4 (88.5)	31.1 (88.0)	31.0 (87.7)
Daily mean °C (°F)	27.3 (81.1)	27.2 (81.0)	27.5 (81.5)	27.9 (82.2)	28.0 (82.4)	27.6 (81.7)	27.4 (81.3)	27.5 (81.5)	27.7 (81.9)	27.7 (81.9)	27.9 (82.2)	27.7 (81.9)	27.6 (81.7)
Mean daily minimum °C (°F)	23.9 (75.0)	23.9 (75.0)	24.1 (75.4)	24.4 (75.9)	24.5 (76.1)	24.2 (75.6)	24.1 (75.4)	24.3 (75.7)	24.5 (76.1)	24.4 (75.9)	24.4 (75.9)	24.2 (75.6)	24.2 (75.6)
Average rainfall mm (inches)	271.8 (10.70)	231.6 (9.12)	208.3 (8.20)	220.2 (8.67)	304.5 (11.99)	438.7 (17.27)	458.2 (18.04)	379.7 (14.95)	301.2 (11.86)	352.3 (13.87)	287.5 (11.32)	304.3 (11.98)	3,758.3 (147.97)
Average rainy days	19.0	15.9	16.7	14.8	20.0	21.9	21.0	19.8	16.8	20.1	18.7	19.9	224.6
Mean monthly sunshine hours	198.4	194.9	244.9	234.0	210.8	168.0	186.0	176.7	198.0	179.8	183.0	182.9	2,357.4
Source: Hong Kong Observatory

== Twin towns and sister cities ==
Koror City is twinned with:

- Angeles City, Philippines
- Davao City, Philippines
- Gilroy, United States

== Notable residents ==
- Villaney Remengesau, human rights activist

== Gallery ==
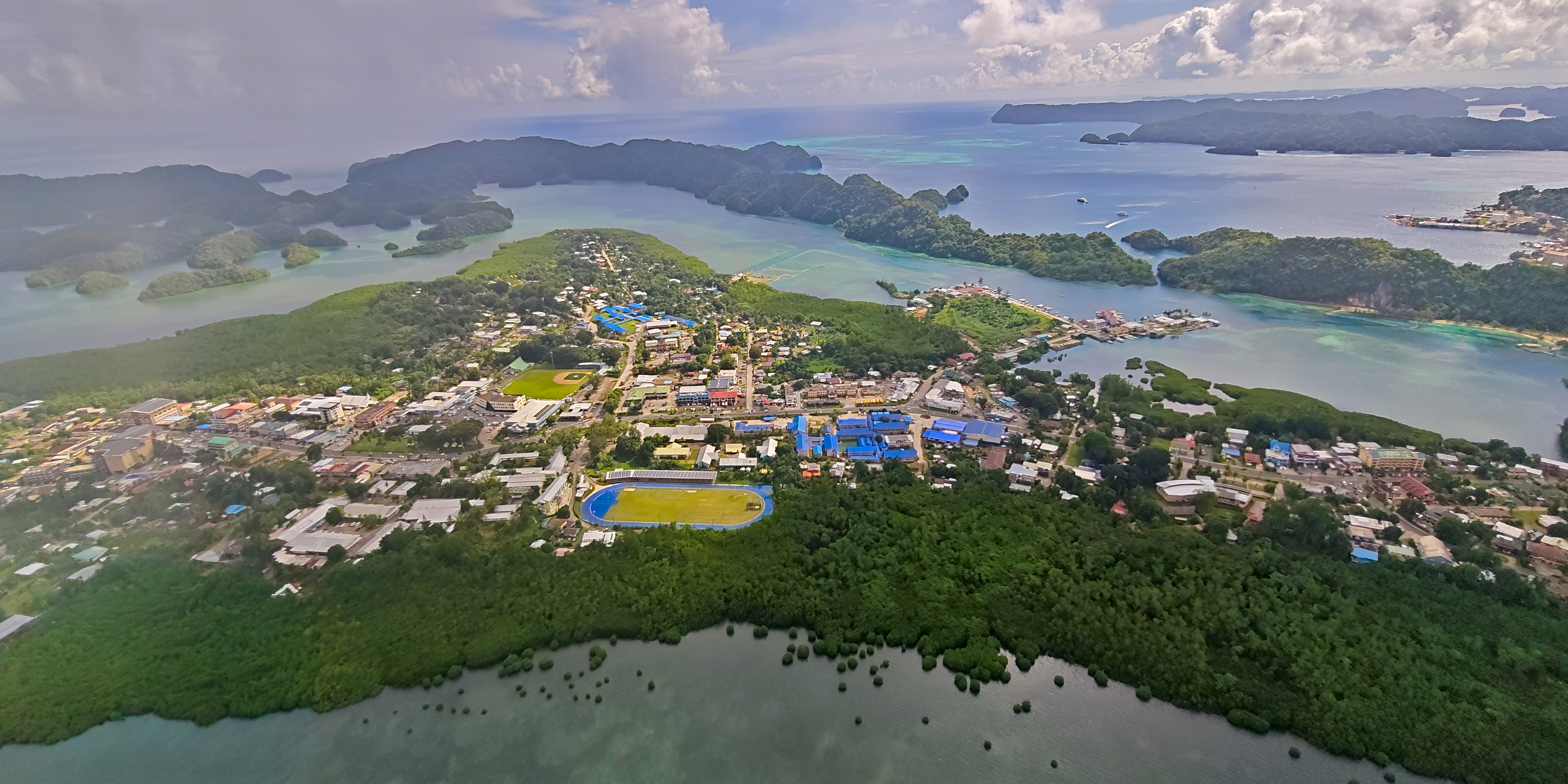
Koror, Palau

== Works cited ==
=== Books ===
- Hezel, Francis (1995). Strangers in Their Own Land: A Century of Colonial Rule in the Caroline and Marshall Islands. University of Hawai'i Press. ISBN 9780824864491.
- Mawdsley, Evan (2024). Supremacy at Sea: Task Force 58 and the Central Pacific Victory. Yale University Press. ISBN 9780300255454.

=== Journals ===
- "Indicators of Climate Change in Palau". Climate Change in Palau. East–West Center: 14–25. 2020. doi:10.2307/resrep28813.5.
- Carlile, Lonny (2000). "Niche or Mass Market? The Regional Context of Tourism in Palau". The Contemporary Pacific. 12 (2). University of Hawaiʻi Press: 415–436. doi:10.2307/23717348. JSTOR 23717348.
