= Humour Me =

Studio album by Jesse Winchester
- Released: 1988
- Label: Sugar Hill/Attic
- Producer: Jesse Winchester

Jesse Winchester chronology
Talk Memphis (1981)	Humour Me (1988)	The Best of Jesse Winchester (1989)

Humour Me is an album by the American-Canadian musician Jesse Winchester, released in 1988. It was his first album in seven years. Humour Me was nominated for a Juno Award, in the "Best Roots or Traditional Album" category. "Well-a-Wiggy" had been a minor hit for the Weather Girls.

== Production ==
Winchester preferred to play live or to work as a songwriter; his manager and Sugar Hill Records head encouraged him to record again. Produced by Winchester, the album was recorded in Nashville. Jerry Douglas played dobro on the album; Dave Pomeroy, Jim Horn, and Béla Fleck also contributed.

== Critical reception ==
Professional ratings
Review scores
Source	Rating
AllMusic	3/5 stars
The Encyclopedia of Popular Music	3/5 stars
MusicHound Folk: The Essential Album Guide	3.5/5 stars
Windsor Star	B+

The Globe and Mail panned the "romantic cliche and kitschy arrangements." The Toronto Star wrote: "Warm, lean, smooth, the singer's voice is a marvellous, communicative instrument, never overwhelmed by fancy arrangements or star instrumentalists." The Windsor Star considered "Too Weak to Say Goodbye" to be the album's best song.

The Washington Post called the album "strictly mid-level stuff," but conceded that it was "nevertheless chock-full of songs that combine insinuating melodies and rhythms with tender sentiments so deftly handled that they never sound as trite as they might appear on paper." The Ottawa Citizen stated that the music ranges from "earthy front porch blues and cafe folk to the odd lounge lizard croon."

AllMusic wrote that "Humour Me lacked the depth of Winchester's best work, but it was easily on a par with his substantial body of craftsmanlike music of the mid-'70s... His voice remained warm and supple."

== Track listing ==
No.	Title	Length
1.	"If I Were Free"
2.	"Thanks to You"
3.	"They Just Can't Help Themselves"
4.	"Too Weak to Say Goodbye"
5.	"Let's Make a Baby King"
6.	"Well-a-Wiggy"
7.	"I Don't Think You Love Me Anymore"
8.	"Willow"
9.	"Humour Me"
10.	"I Want to Mean Something to You"
