= Lainie Marsh =

American singer-songwriter

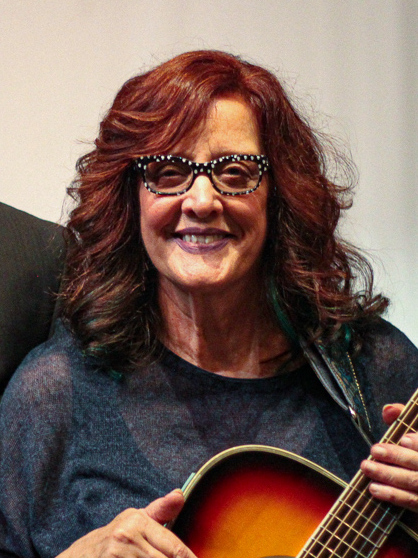
- Born: Marsha Elaine Williams
- Occupations: Singer-songwriter, playwright

Lainie Marsh is an American singer-songwriter. She grew up in West Virginia, attended the Berklee College of Music in Boston, and moved to Nashville in 1989.

Her songs have been recorded by Emmylou Harris and Cerys Matthews, as well as featured on National Public Radio. In 2009, Marsh released her debut album, The Hills Will Cradle Thee.
