= Lány (Chrudim District) =

- Municipality
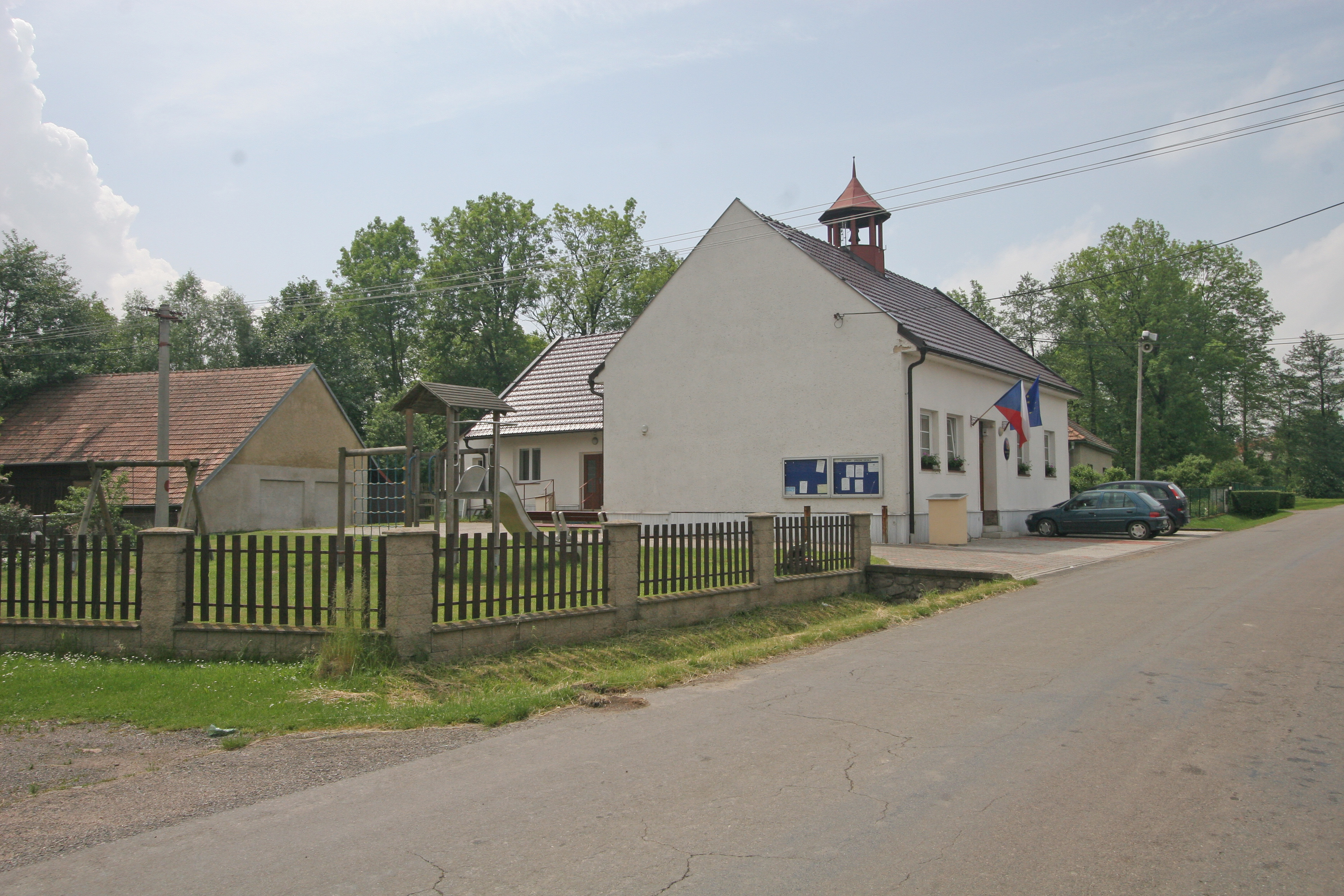
- Municipal office

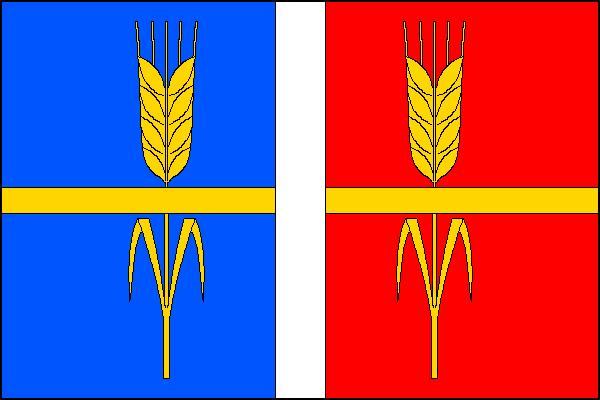
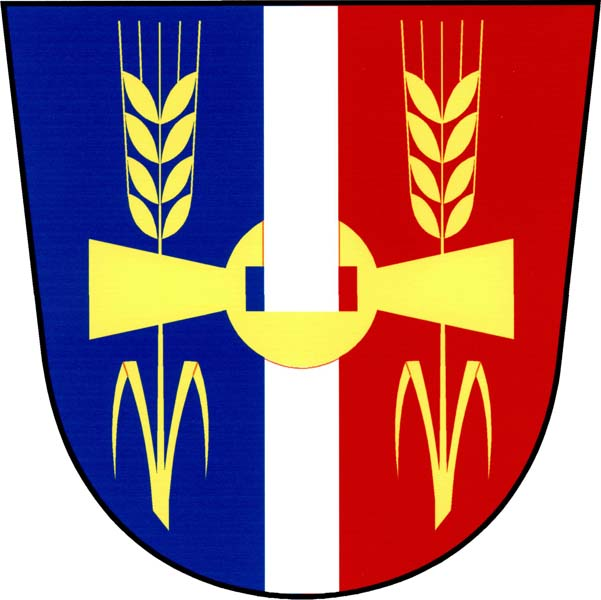
- Flag Coat of arms

- Location in the Czech Republic
- Coordinates: 49°56′53″N 15°43′44″E
- Country: Czech Republic
- Region: Pardubice
- District: Chrudim
- First mentioned: 1388

Area
  - Total: 4.64 km^{2} (1.79 sq mi)
- Elevation: 276 m (906 ft)

Population (2026-01-01)
  - Total: 296
  - Density: 63.8/km^{2} (165/sq mi)
- Time zone: UTC+1 (CET)
  - Summer (DST): UTC+2 (CEST)
- Postal code: 537 01
- Website: www.obeclany.cz

Lány is a municipality and village in Chrudim District in the Pardubice Region of the Czech Republic. It has about 300 inhabitants.

== Administrative division ==
Lány consists of two municipal parts (in brackets population according to the 2021 census):

- Lány (242)
- Kozojedy (54)

== Demographics ==
Historical population
Year	Pop.	±%
1869	441	—
1880	470	+6.6%
1890	487	+3.6%
1900	501	+2.9%
1910	486	−3.0%
1921	455	−6.4%
1930	409	−10.1%
1950	285	−30.3%
1961	303	+6.3%
1970	292	−3.6%
1980	269	−7.9%
1991	223	−17.1%
2001	209	−6.3%
2011	242	+15.8%
2021	296	+22.3%
Source: Censuses
