= Michael Nesmith discography =

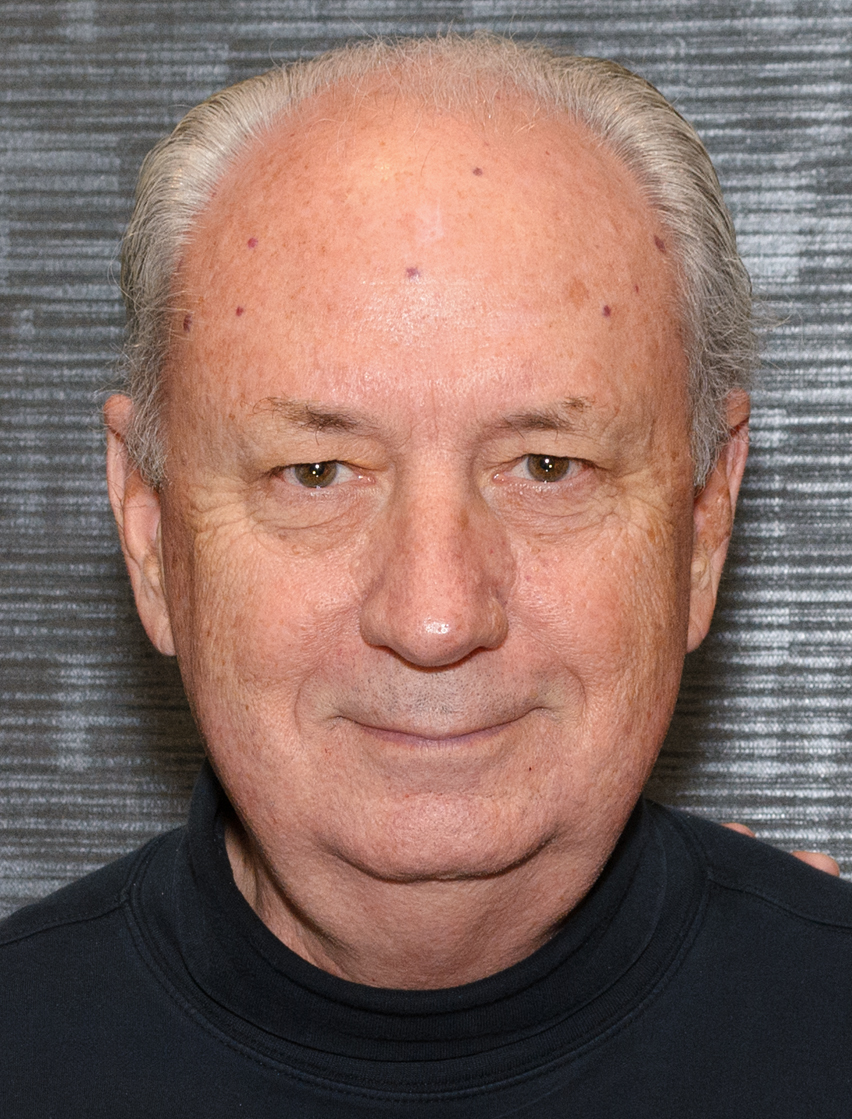
- Michael Nesmith in 2017
- Studio albums: 15
- Live albums: 7
- Compilation albums: 7
- Singles: 27

Michael Nesmith began recording music in 1963. In his early career, Nesmith went under the pseudonym Michael Blessing. In 1966, Nesmith was cast in The Monkees, where he is largely known as his Monkees' persona "Mike". Of the twelve studio albums The Monkees released, Nesmith performed, produced, and wrote songs on ten of the albums. As a solo artist, Nesmith's musical library includes 13 studio albums, a movie soundtrack, and an instrumental album of his songs, which consists of both solo works and works by the First National Band, which Nesmith fronted in the early 1970s. His library of music was primarily recorded on either RCA Records or his own label, Pacific Arts.

== Albums ==
=== Studio albums ===
Year	Title	Label/Catalog #	US	Canada	Notes
1968	The Wichita Train Whistle Sings	Dot 3861 (mono) / 25861 (stereo)	144	–	Album is credited to The Wichita Train Whistle.
1970	Magnetic South	RCA LSP-4371	143	49	Album is credited to Michael Nesmith & The First National Band.
1970	Loose Salute	RCA LSP-4415	159	–	Album is credited to Michael Nesmith & The First National Band.
1971	Nevada Fighter	RCA LSP-4497	218	–	Album is credited to Michael Nesmith & The First National Band.
1972	Tantamount to Treason Vol. 1	RCA LSP-4563	211	–	Album is credited to Michael Nesmith & The Second National Band.
1972	And the Hits Just Keep on Comin'	RCA LSP-4695	208	–	Features only Nesmith and O.J. Rhodes
1973	Pretty Much Your Standard Ranch Stash	RCA APL1-0164	–	–	
1974	The Prison: A Book with a Soundtrack	Pacific Arts PAC-101	–	–	Issued with 48-page book to be read while the LP is playing, allowing for a "soundtrack" to the story.
1977	From a Radio Engine to the Photon Wing	Pacific Arts PAC7-107 / Pacific Arts ILPA-9486	209	–	Early pressings used the overseas catalog # ILPA-9486 used by Island Records.
1979	Infinite Rider on the Big Dogma	Pacific Arts PAC7-130	151	–	There is also a promotional album sent to radio stations prior to release.
1992	Tropical Campfires	Pacific Arts	–	–	
1994	The Garden	Rio Records	–	–	Companion piece to The Prison: A Book with a Soundtrack.
2000	Timerider: The Adventure of Lyle Swann	Rio Records	–	–	Soundtrack from the 1982 movie of the same name.
2005	Rays	Rio Records	–	–	Primarily music only, limited vocals.
2015	The Ocean	Rio Records	–	–	Recitation of the story with music, finishing a trilogy that began with The Prison, and continued with The Garden.

=== Live albums ===
Year	Title	Label/Catalog #	Notes
1978	Live at the Palais	Pacific Arts PAC7-118	
1999	Live at the Britt Festival	Cooking Vinyl	Recorded live in 1992 at the Britt Festival in Jacksonville, Oregon.
2010	The Amazing ZigZag Concert	Road Goes On Forever Records ZZBOX1974	Nesmith's concert is disc 5 of a 5 CD various artists box set. Recorded in April 1974.
2014	Movies of the Mind	Pacific Arts / Videoranch	Michael Nesmith's fall 2013 tour was documented on Movies of the Mind.
2017	At The BBC Paris Theatre	7A Records	Michael Nesmith's live performance in London on November 27, 1975. Released as a CD and Vinyl Picture Disc.
2018	Live at the Troubadour	7A Records	Billed as "Michael Nesmith & the First National Band Redux." Live recording of January 2018 concert at the Troubadour (where Nesmith played in 1964).
2019	Cosmic Partners – The McCabe's Tapes	7A Records	Billed as "Michael Nesmith with Red Rhodes." Recorded live at McCabe's Guitar Shop, Santa Monica, CA, August 18, 1973.

=== Compilation albums ===
Year	Title	Label/Catalog #	Notes
1977	Compilation	Pacific Arts PAC7-106	
1989	The Newer Stuff	Rhino	Contains eight prev. unreleased, archival tracks and six remixed tracks from "Photon Wing" and "Infinite Rider". LP release featured fewer tracks.
1991	The Older Stuff	Rhino	Greatest hits of RCA recordings.
1993	Complete First National Band Recordings	Pacific Arts	The three First National Band albums (Magnetic South, Loose Salute and Nevada Fighter) on two discs.
1997	Listen to the Band	(Camden 74321 523772)	European compilation of RCA recordings.
2008	Rio: The Best Of Michael Nesmith	(Music Club Deluxe MCDLX092)	UK 2-CD compilation of studio and live recordings.
2021	Different Drum: The Lost RCA Victor Recordings	Real Gone Music RGM-1044	alternate takes and unreleased tracks

=== Box sets ===
Year	Title	Label/Catalog #	Notes
2015	Michael Nesmith – Original Album Classics	RCA	Boxed set containing Magnetic South, Loose Salute, Nevada Fighter, Tantamount to Treason & And the Hits Just Keep on Comin'. Contains 4 bonus tracks.

=== Promotional albums ===
Year	Title	Label/Catalog #	Highest Billboard Position	Notes
1979	The Michael Nesmith Radio Special	Pacific Arts PAC7-1300	–	Promotional LP featuring all the tracks from Infinite Rider on the Big Dogma as well as interview snippets.

== Singles ==
Date	U.S. Label & number	Titles (A-side, B-side)	US Billboard Hot 100	US Cash Box	US Billboard A/C	CAN	CAN A/C	AUS	Notes	Album
1963	Highness HN-13	"Wanderin" b/w "Well, Well"	–	–	–	–	–	–	Credited as Mike Nesmith. Vanity pressing	Non-album tracks
1965	Omnibus 239	"How Can You Kiss Me" b/w "Just A Little Love"	–	–	–	–	–	–	Credited as Mike & John & Bill. John London is the bassist, later of Nesmith's First National Band. Bill Sleeper is the drummer. (The trio broke up when Sleeper was drafted into the US Army.)	Non-album tracks
09/1965	Colpix CP-787	"The New Recruit" b/w "A Journey with Michael Blessing"	–	–	–	–	–	–	Credited to Michael Blessing.	Non-album tracks
11/9/1965	Colpix CP-792	"Until It's Time for You to Go" b/w "What Seems To Be the Trouble Officer"	–	–	–	–	–	–	Credited to Michael Blessing.	Non-album tracks
4/1967	Edan 1001	"Just A Little Love" b/w "Curson Terrace"	–	–	–	–	–	–	A-side is same as Omnibus 239. B-side is credited to Mike & Tony. Mike has stated in an interview that it's him, but has no idea who Tony was.	Non-album tracks
07/1968	Dot 45-17152	"Tapioca Tundra" b/w "Don't Cry Now"	–	–	–	–	–	–	Credited to The Wichita Train Whistle. L.A.'s finest session musicians, led by Nesmith, though he does not appear on the recordings as either musician or vocalist. "Don't Cry Now" is edited from the album.	The Wichita Train Whistle Sings
07/1970	RCA 47-9853	"Little Red Rider" b/w "Rose City Chimes" (Non-album track)	–	–	–	–	–	–	Credited to Michael Nesmith and the First National Band. Until its release as a bonus track on CD in 2001, non-LP 'B' side was a sought after collectable.	Magnetic South
08/1970	RCA 74-0368	"Joanne" b/w "One Rose"	21	17	6	4	-	3	Credited to Michael Nesmith and the First National Band.	Magnetic South
11/1970	RCA 74-0399	"Silver Moon" b/w "Lady Of The Valley"	42	28	7	13	13	11	Credited to Michael Nesmith and the First National Band. Also reached #34 in Germany.	Loose Salute
04/1971	RCA 74-0453	"Nevada Fighter" b/w "Here I Am"	70	73	–	67	–	–	Credited to Michael Nesmith and the First National Band. Issued with picture sleeve.	Nevada Fighter
06/1971	RCA 74-0491	"Texas Morning" b/w "Tumbling Tumbleweeds"	–	–	–	–	–	–	Credited to Michael Nesmith and the First National Band. Single released as promo with both songs on B-side and "Texas" only on A-side with release #SPS-45-263.	Nevada Fighter
10/1971	RCA 74-0540	"I've Just Begun To Care (Propinquity)" b/w "Only Bound"	–	95	–	–	–	–	Credited to Michael Nesmith and the First National Band.	Nevada Fighter
01/1972	RCA 74-0629	"Mama Rocker" b/w "Lazy Lady"	–	–	–	–	–	–	Credited to Michael Nesmith and the Second National Band. A-side is faded out early versus LP version.	Tantamount To Treason Volume One
08/1972	RCA 74-0804	"Roll With The Flow" b/w "Keep On"	–	–	–	–	–	–	"Roll With the Flow" is edited from LP version.	And The Hits Just Keep Comin'
03/1977	Pacific Arts IP084	"Rio" b/w "Life, The Unsuspecting Captive" (from The Prison)	–	–	–	–	–	4	A shorter version (3:29) released as a double-sided stereo promo as IP088. Reached number 28 in the UK and received considerable radio airplay.	From A Radio Engine To The Photon Wing
06/1978	Pacific Arts PAC45-101	"Roll With The Flow" b/w "I've Just Begun To Care (Propinquity)"	–	–	–	–	–	–	Both songs are edited from the live LP.	Live At The Palais
1979	Pacific Arts PAC45-104	"Rio" b/w "Casablanca Moonlight"	–	–	–	–	–	–	Issued with picture sleeve. Shorter version than Pacific Arts IP084.	From A Radio Engine To The Photon Wing
06/1979	Pacific Arts PAC45-106	"Magic" b/w "Dance"	–	–	–	–	–	–		Infinite Rider On The Big Dogma
08/1979	Pacific Arts PAC45-108	"Cruisin'" b/w "Horserace"	–	–	–	–	–	–		Infinite Rider On The Big Dogma
Reissue singles
05/1971	RCA 447-0868	"Joanne" / "Silver Moon"	–	–	–	–	–	–	Reissue credited to Michael Nesmith and the First National Band. Early pressings on red label, later pressings on black label.	
1998	Collectibles COL-4759	"Joanne" / "Silver Moon"	–	–	–	–	–	–	Reissue.	

- Nesmith recorded "The World is Golden Too" in 1975 for the Japanese movie Blue Angels. An edited version of this song was released as a 45. The uncut version appears on the soundtrack.

== MP3 single songs ==
In 2011, Nesmith began releasing new recordings as MP3 downloads from his website, Videoranch.com. The songs are available under two headings (or album collections): Iteration and Around the Sun. As each song is updated and remixed, Nesmith has released the updated version. In addition to the new music, Nesmith also releases live songs and alternate mixes of songs from previous albums.

Year	Title	Label	Notes
2011	Helen's Eternal Birthday Single	Pacific Arts/Videoranch	The first MP3 single to be released from Videoranch. Two versions were released. The second version was titled "January – Helen's Eternal Birthday Single v1.0". The first version has since been removed.
2011	Only Understanding Love	Pacific Arts/Videoranch	Released in two mixes, 1.0 and 2.0
2011	Smiles of Autumn	Pacific Arts/Videoranch	Released as version 1.0
2012	Love Is The Place	Pacific Arts/Videoranch	Two versions were available (rough mixes 1.0 and 2.0), but both have since been deleted.
2012	Life is Long	Pacific Arts/Videoranch	Three versions are available (version 1.0, 1.1 and 2.5)
2012	I Know What I Know	Pacific Arts/Videoranch	Four versions are available (version 1.0, 1.5, 1.6 and 2.0). However, what is presumed to be the final version was released in 2016 on The Monkees' album, Good Times
