= Complete First National Band Recordings =

Compilation album by Michael Nesmith
- Released: Sep 28, 1993
- Genre: Rock, country rock
- Length: 93:44
- Label: Pacific Arts
- Producer: Michael Nesmith

Michael Nesmith chronology
Tropical Campfires (1992)	Complete First National Band Recordings (1993)	The Garden (1994)

Professional ratings
Review scores
Source	Rating
Allmusic	4.5/5 stars
Take Country Back	(favorable)

Complete First National Band Recordings (or simply Complete) is a compilation album by Michael Nesmith, released in 1993. It contains the three albums Nesmith recorded with the First National Band in 1970 and 1971 on a two-CD set. Magnetic South (minus "First National Rag") and Loose Salute are on the first CD, while Nevada Fighter is on the second CD.

Magnetic South was previously reissued in 1999 as 16 Original Classics with five bonus tracks. It was also reissued with Loose Salute on CD by RCA/BMG International in 2000. Both albums were remastered for this release. Complete does not include remastered tracks.

Despite being billed as the complete recordings of the First National Band, the 2-disc set does not include "First National Rag" from Magnetic South, "First National Dance" (a bonus track on Loose Salute) or "Rose City Chimes", the B-side to "Little Red Rider".

== Track listing ==
All songs written by Michael Nesmith except where otherwise noted.

1. "Calico Girlfriend" – 2:37
2. "Nine Times Blue" – 1:39
3. "Little Red Rider" – 2:34
4. "The Crippled Lion" – 3:10
5. "Joanne" – 3:10
6. "Mama Nantucket" – 2:36
7. "Keys to the Car" – 2:52
8. "Hollywood" – 5:03
9. "One Rose" (D. Lyon, L. McIntyre) – 3:27
10. "Beyond the Blue Horizon" (Richard A. Whiting, W. Franke Harling, Leo Robin) – 5:55
11. "Silver Moon" – 3:15
12. "I Fall to Pieces" (Harlan Howard, Hank Cochran) – 2:56
13. "Thanx for the Ride" – 2:48
14. "Dedicated Friend" – 2:27
15. "Conversations" – 3:27
16. "Tengo Amore" – 3:00
17. "Listen to the Band" – 2:35
18. "Bye, Bye, Bye" – 3:17
19. "Lady of the Valley" – 2:57
20. "Hello Lady" – 3:49
21. "Grand Ennui" – 2:07
22. "Propinquity (I've Just Begun To Care)" – 2:59
23. "Here I Am" – 3:15
24. "Only Bound" – 3:23
25. "Nevada Fighter" – 3:06
26. "Texas Morning" (Mike Murphy, Boomer Castleman) – 3:00
27. "Tumbling Tumbleweeds" (Bob Nolan) – 4:10
28. "I Looked Away" (Eric Clapton, Bobby Whitlock) – 3:13
29. "Rainmaker" (Harry Nilsson, Bill Martin) – 3:17
30. "René" (Red Rhodes) – 1:40

== Personnel ==
- Michael Nesmith – vocals, guitar
- John London – bass
- John Ware – drums
- O.J. "Red" Rhodes – pedal steel guitar
- Glen D. Hardin – piano
- Earl P. Ball – piano
- Joe Osborn – bass
- Max Bennett – bass
- Glen D. Hardin – keyboards
- Michael Cohen – keyboards
- Ron Tutt – drums
- James Burton – guitar
- Al Casey – guitar
