= The Newer Stuff =

Compilation album by Michael Nesmith
- Released: March 28, 1989
- Genre: Rock
- Label: Rhino
- Producer: Michael Nesmith

Michael Nesmith chronology
| Infinite Rider on the Big Dogma (1979) | The Newer Stuff (1989) | The Older Stuff (1991) |

Professional ratings
Review scores
| Source | Rating |
|---|---|
| Allmusic | 3/5 stars |

The Newer Stuff is a compilation album by Michael Nesmith, released in 1989. The album was released on vinyl, cassette and CD. The Newer Stuff was the first Nesmith album to be released on compact disc. The album contains eight new tracks (all recorded in 1980, according to Nesmith's comments in the CD booklet), two tracks from From a Radio Engine to the Photon Wing, and four from Infinite Rider on the Big Dogma. The CD release featured additional tracks from the LP release.

The songs "Carioca" and "Crusin'" are alternate mixes from the original versions found on their respective albums.

== Track listing ==
All songs written by Michael Nesmith except where otherwise noted.

1. "Total Control" – 3:55
2. "Tanya" – 4:15
3. "I'll Remember You" – 3:55
4. "Formosa Diner" – 3:50
5. "Dreamer" – 4:45
6. "Eldorado to the Moon" (Bill Martin) – 2:49
7. "Tahiti Condo" – 3:54
8. "Chow Mein and Bowling" (Martin) – 3:24
9. "Magic" – 3:59
10. "Cruisin'" – 3:54
11. "Light" – 3:22
12. "Carioca" – 4:18
13. "Rio" – 6:12
14. "Casablanca Moonlight" – 6:40
