= The Michael Nesmith Radio Special =

Studio album by Michael Nesmith
- Released: 1980
- Genre: Rock
- Label: Pacific Arts
- Producer: Michael Nesmith

In 1980, Pacific Arts issued The Michael Nesmith Radio Special to promote Nesmith's latest album Infinite Rider on the Big Dogma. Because Infinite Rider was originally released as a multimedia project, the radio special was designed to increase awareness of Nesmith's audio-visual productions, as well as promote the album.

The radio special comprises segments of an interview with Nesmith intercut with tracks from Infinite Rider. During the interview, Nesmith discusses The Monkees, his first public acknowledgement of his former band since the dedication on his 1970 album, Magnetic South.

As with many of Nesmith's compositions, the titles of his songs were often indefinite. When he recorded the radio special, Nesmith had yet to finalize the song titles for Infinite Rider and the alternate track names are listed along with the interview.

Currently, the only copies of The Michael Nesmith Radio Special are available on LP (Pacific Arts #PAC7-1300), which was a limited release and is difficult to find.

== Alternate track listing ==
=== The Michael Nesmith Radio Special tracks ===
1. Dance and Have A Good Time
2. This Night Is Magic
3. The Television Song (Tonight)
4. Flying (Silks And Satins)
5. Blue Carioca
6. Cruisin'
7. Daughter of Rock'N'Roll
8. Light (The Eclectic Light)
9. Horse Race (Beauty & Magnum Force)
10. Capsule

=== Infinite Rider on the Big Dogma tracks ===
1. Dance
2. Magic
3. Tonight
4. Flying
5. Carioca
6. Cruisin'
7. Factions
8. Light
9. Horserace
10. Capsule
