= Original Spanish Kitchen =

Restaurant in Los Angeles, California, US (1938–1961)

Spanish Kitchen
- Interactive map of Spanish Kitchen

Restaurant information
- Established: 1938
- Location: 7373 Beverly Boulevard, Los Angeles, California, 90036, United States
- Coordinates: 34.0763°N 118.3506°W

The Original Spanish Kitchen was a restaurant on Beverly Boulevard in the Fairfax District of Los Angeles, California, US, that became the subject of an urban legend starting in the early 1960s. The restaurant, which opened in 1938, was a popular eating spot until it closed in September 1961.

== History ==
=== Working restaurant ===
For decades, the Original Spanish Kitchen served meals to Hollywood customers like Bob Hope, Buster Keaton, Howard Keel and John and Lionel Barrymore. Opened in the late 1930s, it was a sister restaurant to one downtown, owned by Johnny and Pearl Caretto. Their enchiladas were an immediate success, attracting show-business personalities as regulars. Mary Pickford, legend has it, had her own booth, by the door, offering up not only autographs to fans, but also recipes to Johnny—which would appear on the menu.

=== Shuttering and mystery ===
In 1961, the restaurant closed for vacation—a pause that mysteriously lasted for decades. Following its closure, the building's contents were left intact for years afterward, the tables remaining set with full place settings and the lunch counter fully stocked with coffeemakers and cooking utensils. The restaurant's sudden closure gave rise to speculation and the subsequent urban legend that the owners, who lived in an apartment above the restaurant, were murdered at the hands of organized crime. The truth was more prosaic, according to a 1986 article in Tables magazine by reporter Don Ray. He determined that the owner had been diagnosed with Parkinson's disease and the restaurant had been shuttered by his wife after she found that she was not up to the task of running it.

=== Epilogue ===
After nearly 40 years in limbo, the building became the site of an upscale beauty salon in 2005. The Original Spanish Kitchen's original vertical electric sign, which had become a Los Angeles landmark over the years, was modified to read simply "SPA", a reference to the new business on the location. Another Spanish Kitchen on the Restaurant Row section of nearby La Cienega Boulevard had a replica of the Original Spanish Kitchen sign on the side of its building, although this is not the original building. The replica of the Spanish Kitchen closed in July 2012.

The Original Spanish Kitchen appears briefly in the background of the Michael Nesmith video for his song "Cruisin'", which is part of his "Elephant Parts" compilation, filmed in 1980, and released in 1981. It is in a five-second vignette which accompanies the words, "passing up the treats from a Kid named Cisco", in the second verse of the song.

== See also ==
- El Cholo Spanish Cafe
