= William Dear =

Canadian actor and filmmaker (born 1943)

- Born: November 30, 1943 (age 82); Toronto, Ontario, Canada
- Other name: Bill Dear
- Occupations: Actor, director, producer, screenwriter
- Years active: 1969–present
- Notable work: Harry and the Hendersons; If Looks Could Kill; Angels in the Outfield; Wild America; Santa Who?

William Dear (born November 30, 1943) is a Canadian actor, director, producer and screenwriter. He is known for directing the films Harry and the Hendersons, If Looks Could Kill, Angels in the Outfield, Wild America, and Santa Who?.

He has directed episodes of the television series Saturday Night Live, Television Parts, Amazing Stories, Dinosaurs, Covington Cross, and The Wannabes Starring Savvy.

Dear was born on November 30, 1943, in Toronto, Ontario. He is the father of actor and storyboard artist Oliver Dear.

== Career ==
Dear's film career began in the early 1970s, when he directed industrial films and television advertisements. He transitioned into feature film work in the late 1970s when he was hired as a second unit director by Paul Schrader for his films Blue Collar and Hardcore. Dear directed his first major production, Timerider: The Adventure of Lyle Swann for Pacific Arts after he had impressed founder Michael Nesmith with the musical short he directed for Nesmith's song "Rio".

== Filmography ==
=== Director ===
- Nymph (1973)
- Northville Cemetery Massacre (1976)
- PopClips (1980)
- Elephant Parts (1981)
- Timerider: The Adventure of Lyle Swann (1982)
- Harry and the Hendersons (1987)
- If Looks Could Kill (1991)
- Journey to the Center of the Earth (1993)
- Angels in the Outfield (1994)
- Wild America (1997)
- Balloon Farm (1999)
- Santa Who? (2000)
- School of Life (2005)
- Simon Says (2006)
- The Foursome (2006)
- The Sandlot: Heading Home (2007)
- Free Style (2008)
- The Perfect Game (2009)
- Mr. Troop Mom (2009)
- Politics of Love (2011)
- A Mile in His Shoes (2011)

=== Actor ===
- Timerider: The Adventure of Lyle Swann (1982) - 3rd Technician
- Harry and the Hendersons (1987) - Sighting Man
- Darkman (1990) - Limo Driver
- If Looks Could Kill (1991) - Bomb Tester
- Angels in the Outfield (1994) - Toronto Manager
- Midnight Stallion (2013) - Whip T. Vicker
- Razor (2017) - Bill
