= Rays (Michael Nesmith album) =

Studio album by Michael Nesmith
- Released: 2005
- Label: Pacific Arts
- Producer: Michael Nesmith

Michael Nesmith chronology
Timerider: The Adventure of Lyle Swann (soundtrack) (2000)	Rays (2005)	Movies of the Mind (2014)

Rays is an album by Michael Nesmith, originally released in a limited edition of 100 in November 2005, then later released in an unlimited edition in April 2006. Nesmith described the album as a cinematic journey of sound with elements of swing, jazz and instrumental funk that forms what he calls "New Century Modern".

Rays was Nesmith's penultimate studio album, his final album being Ocean (2015), a book-and-audio album completing the Infinitia trilogy started in 1974.

Professional ratings
Review scores
Source	Rating
Allmusic	2/5 stars

== Background ==
The album cover is a comic strip drawn by Drew Friedman and features Nesmith "driving" through five stages of his life, with a quest of looking to fill his "appetite": 1) His earlier career in The Monkees, where he is seen driving a Pontiac GTO and wearing his signature knit-cap; 2) His career as the frontman of the First National Band, driving a Jeep; 3) His Elephant Parts-era career, where he is seen driving a pink Cadillac (referring to his song, "Eldorado to the Moon"); 4) His later life as an author, entrepreneur and philanthropist, driving a Rolls-Royce and asking, "where am I?"; 5) And in the center of the cartoon, Nesmith is sitting peacefully under a tree on a hill, content with himself, stating, "suddenly, I’m not as hungry as I’d thought".

== Track listing ==
All songs written by Michael Nesmith.

1. "Zip Ribbon" – 3:05
2. "Dynaflow" – 4:11
3. "Friedrider " – 3:08
4. "Carhop" – 3:58
5. "Boomcar" – 3:43
6. "Best of It" – 2:29
7. "Ed's October Café" – 3:18
8. "Rays" – 3:37
9. "Bells" – 4:28
10. "Land o Pies" – 2:50
11. "There It Is" – 3:40
12. "Follows the Heart" – 3:12

== Personnel ==
- Michael Nesmith – vocals, synthesizer, guitar, keyboards
- Gregg Bissonette – drums
- Luis Conte – percussion
- John Hobbs – keyboards, keyboard bass
- Chester Thompson – Hammond B3 organ
- Kurt Wagner – vocals

Production notes

- Michael Nesmith – producer, engineer, sampling, technician
- Richard Bryant – engineer, technician
- Drew Friedman – text, cover art
- Michael MacDonald – engineer, technician
- Gary McGrath – assistant to Michael MacDonald at Private Island Trax
