= Timerider: The Adventure of Lyle Swann (soundtrack) =

Soundtrack album by Michael Nesmith
- Released: 2000
- Recorded: 1982
- Genre: soundtrack
- Label: Videoranch / Pacific Arts Corporation
- Producer: Michael Nesmith

Michael Nesmith chronology
Live at the Britt Festival (1999)	Timerider: The Adventure of Lyle Swann (2000)	Rays (2006)

The soundtrack for Timerider: The Adventure of Lyle Swann was written and recorded by Michael Nesmith for the movie by the same name.

Although recorded in 1982 for the movie, Nesmith did not release the soundtrack until 2000. Originally released through his website, Videoranch, the album is now readily available through most distributors. The soundtrack is available on compact disc and MP3 downloads.

Timerider is the only Nesmith album to be released under the label of Videoranch. The Videoranch label is a sub-company of Nesmith's parent company, Pacific Arts Corporation, which also owns the Zoomo Productions (the production company of Timerider: The Adventure of Lyle Swann. The Timerider soundtrack is the second album Nesmith released which does not feature any vocals (the first was his 1968 album The Wichita Train Whistle Sings).

== Track listing ==
All music is composed by Michael Nesmith.

No.	Title	Length
1.	"The Baja 1000"	3:13
2.	"Lost in the Weeds"	1:43
3.	"Somewhere Around 1875"	1:06
4.	"Scared to Death"	0:58
5.	"Silks and Sixguns"	0:57
6.	"Dead Man's Duds"	1:28
7.	"Two Swanns at the Pond"	2:20
8.	"I Want That Machine"	0:51
9.	"Escape to San Marcos"	2:24
10.	"Claire's Cabin"	2:01
11.	"No Jurisdiction"	0:54
12.	"Murder at Swallow's Camp"	2:17
13.	"Claire's Rescue"	1:54
14.	"Up the Hill to Nowhere"	3:19
15.	"Out of Ammo"	3:08
16.	"Reprise"	3:31
