= Northville Cemetery Massacre =

1976 film by William Dear

- Theatrical release poster
- Directed by: William Dear; Thomas L. Dyke
- Written by: William Dear; Thomas L. Dyke
- Produced by: William Dear; Thomas L. Dyke
- Starring: David Hyry; J. Craig Collicut; Carson Jackson; Nick Nolte (voice only)
- Cinematography: William Dear; Thomas L. Dyke
- Edited by: Christa Kindt; Jerry Wellen
- Music by: Michael Nesmith
- Distributed by: Cannon Films
- Release date: March 1976
- Running time: 82 minutes
- Country: United States
- Language: English

Northville Cemetery Massacre is a 1976 outlaw biker film written and directed by William Dear and Thomas L. Dyke. Nick Nolte did an uncredited voice over for the film's lead actor, David Hyry.

== Plot ==
An outlaw motorcycle club commits illegal acts, but only to make a point against police corruption. They are normally law-abiding, even going so far as to help an elderly couple whose car stops running. When a police officer rapes a woman, he frames the crime on the bikers. The town's citizens attack the gang in revenge, leading to a battle.

== Production ==
William Dear asked Michael Nesmith to compose the film's music and Nesmith agreed. The film's crew was unable to pay him, but he composed the music for free. The author Steven Puchalski referred to the film as the "perfect funeral wreath to the biker movie phenomenon". It was filmed using 16 mm film.

== Reception ==
Bill Gibron, writing for DVD Verdict, said, "amid all its gory, blood-soaked brazenness, there's a message about personal and public perspective that is awfully hard to miss". Scott Weinberg, of DVD Talk, said, "Highly recommended to anyone who's old enough to remember and appreciate this type of low-budget, down & dirty, occasionally terrible but entirely watchable genre fare."

A TV Guide review said, "Unimaginatively directed and too bloody for words".

== Home media ==
The film was released on VHS under Northville Cemetery Massacre, as well as Freedom R.I.P. and Harley's Angels. It was released on DVD in 2006 with three commentaries, behind the scenes pictures, previous film posters, three film trailers, and biographies. The DVD is the 30th Anniversary Director's Cut.
