= From a Radio Engine to the Photon Wing =

Studio album by Michael Nesmith
- Released: March 1977
- Genres: Country rock; tropical rock
- Length: 40:47
- Label: Pacific Arts
- Producer: Michael Nesmith

Michael Nesmith chronology
The Prison: A Book with a Soundtrack (1974)	From a Radio Engine to the Photon Wing (1977)	Live at the Palais (1978)

Professional ratings
Review scores
Source	Rating
Allmusic	3/5 stars

From a Radio Engine to the Photon Wing was released in 1977 and is the ninth album by Michael Nesmith and eighth studio album as a singer/songwriter during his post-Monkees career. The album was Nesmith's second with vocals released on his own label, Pacific Arts.

The song "Love's First Kiss" is rare example of Nesmith collaborating with other songwriters to compose a song.

One single was released from the album in the US and worldwide, "Rio". Because of the length of the song, approximately three minutes were edited out of the song for the release of the single. Additionally, Nesmith recorded a promotional video for the track, "Rio", which was created by Nesmith, William Dear, and William E. Martin. In other areas of the world where "Rio" gained chart success (such as England and Australia), a follow-up single, "Navajo Trail" b/w "Love's First Kiss", was issued.

== Track listing ==
All songs by Michael Nesmith except where noted.

1. "Rio" – 7:02
2. "Casablanca Moonlight" – 6:40
3. "More Than We Imagine" – 3:22
4. "Navajo Trail" (Marjorie Elliott) – 5:39
5. "We Are Awake" – 4:54
6. "Wisdom Has Its Way" – 5:12
7. "Love's First Kiss" (Fred Myrow, Michael Nesmith) – 3:55
8. "The Other Room" – 4:20

== Charts ==
Chart (1977)	Peak position
Australia (Kent Music Report)	24

== Personnel ==
- Michael Nesmith – vocals, guitar
- David Briggs – keyboards
- Jerry Carrigan – drums
- Shane Keister – keyboards
- Larrie Londin – drums
- Lonnie Mack – guitar
- David MacKay – bass
- Weldon Myrick – dobro, pedal steel guitar
- Pebble Daniel – background vocals
- Linda Hargrove – background vocals
- Marcia Routh – background vocals
- Nelson Stump – cowbell
- Lisa Silver – violin
- Greg "Fingers" Taylor – harmonica
