= The Older Stuff =

The Older Stuff: Best of Michael Nesmith (1970-1973)

Compilation album by Michael Nesmith
- Released: 1991
- Genre: Country Rock
- Label: Rhino
- Producer: Michael Nesmith

Michael Nesmith chronology
The Newer Stuff (1989)	The Older Stuff: Best of Michael Nesmith (1970-1973) (1991)	Tropical Campfires (1992)

Professional ratings
Review scores
Source	Rating
Allmusic	4.5/5 stars

The Older Stuff: Best of Michael Nesmith (1970-1973) (or more simply The Older Stuff) is a compilation album by Michael Nesmith, released in 1991.

As a follow-up to The Newer Stuff, this release includes tracks from Nesmith's RCA Victor recordings from 1970-1973.

== Track listing ==
All songs written by Michael Nesmith except where otherwise noted.

1. "Joanne" – 3:13
2. "The Crippled Lion" – 3:13
3. "I Fall to Pieces" (Harlan Howard, Hank Cochran) – 2:57
4. "Listen to the Band" – 2:34
5. "Silver Moon" – 3:13
6. "Propinquity (I've Just Begun to Care)" – 3:00
7. "I Looked Away" (Eric Clapton, Bobby Whitlock) – 3:15
8. "Nevada Fighter" – 3:08
9. "Tumbling Tumbleweeds" (Bob Nolan) – 3:47
10. "Here I Am" – 3:19
11. "Some of Shelly's Blues" – 3:22
12. "Born to Love You" (Cindy Walker) – 3:52
13. "Different Drum" – 3:02
14. "Harmony Constant" – 3:47
15. "Continuing" – 3:53
16. "Prairie Lullaby Hill 4:05
17. "Release" – 3:50
18. "Roll With the Flow" – 5:08
