= Follow the Music =

2000 autobiography by Jac Holzman and Gavan Daws

- Author: Jac Holzman, Gavan Daws
- Language: English
- Publisher: Jawbone Press
- Publication date: Aug 30, 2000
- Publication place: United States
- Media type: Print (Hardback & Paperback)
- Pages: 444 pages

Follow The Music the autobiography of record mogul Jac Holzman and the founding of his record company Elektra Records, written by Jac Holzman and Gavan Daws.

The book follows Holzman on his journey from overseeing limited pressings of obscure folk artists to signing international stars such as The Doors, right up to the sale of the company and beyond.

== Reception ==
Since its initial publication in 1998, the book has been described as "a must-read addition to the best chronicles of popular music in this over-stulated century" by Timothy White, editor in chief at Billboard magazine, and an "extraordinary history ... funny, enlightening, and entertaining" by Allmusic. In a review for Variety, Phil Gallo described the book as "basic and straightforward", as well as being "a quick and easy read".
