= And the Hits Just Keep on Comin' =

Studio album by Michael Nesmith
- Released: August 1972
- Recorded: March 1972
- Genre: Progressive country
- Length: 33:26
- Label: RCA Victor
- Producer: Michael Nesmith

Michael Nesmith chronology
| Tantamount to Treason Vol. 1 (1971) | And the Hits Just Keep on Comin' (1972) | Pretty Much Your Standard Ranch Stash (1973) |

And the Hits Just Keep on Comin' is an album by Michael Nesmith. Recorded for RCA Records, it was his fifth solo album after leaving The Monkees. The album was recorded and released in 1972; all ten tracks had been composed by Nesmith prior to and during his time as a member of The Monkees.

== Background ==
The album features Nesmith on vocals and acoustic guitar and long-time accompanist Red Rhodes on pedal steel guitar. Nesmith has stated that the title of the album is a reaction to RCA Records repeatedly asking him to write more hit songs and features Nesmith's own version of his tune "Different Drum", a hit for The Stone Poneys featuring Linda Ronstadt in 1967.

The version of "Different Drum" found here features four verses as opposed to the three in Linda Ronstadt's version; the verses in the Ronstadt version are the song's first, the second, the bridge, and then the fourth. "Different Drum" made a brief unofficial debut on The Monkees episode "Too Many Girls" when Mike, posing as a folk singer suffering from stage fright, butchers its lyrics while playing the guitar badly.

Nesmith and Rhodes recorded an instrumental, "Cantata & Fugue In C&W," for the album but it was left off.

Several songs (notably "Keep On") reflect a theme common to Nesmith's country-flavored tracks — the theme of never letting fear get the best of you. The liner notes to the album are signed "Papa Nes".

Reflecting on the album in 2019, Nesmith said, “It was at a time when we were all fast and loose and playing music as hard as we could. It was a time of altered states and new ideas, and in a new way, we’re in that time again. Politics have gone askew, like they did then. This was in 1972, and things were absolutely crazy then, and they’re absolutely crazy now.”

And the Hits Just Keep on Comin' was later re-released on the Pacific Arts label and also reissued on compact disc by RCA/BMG in 2000 coupled with Pretty Much Your Standard Ranch Stash.

Nesmith performed the album on tour with Pete Finney playing pedal steel guitar in 2019.

== Reception ==
Professional ratings
Review scores
| Source | Rating |
|---|---|
| Allmusic | 4.5/5 stars |

In a retrospective review for Allmusic, critic Mark Deming called the album "truly inspired" and wrote "Nesmith and Rhodes use the album's spare instrumentation to their advantage, with the performances both empathetic and intimate, and Rhodes' masterful steel gives these songs a graceful resonance few full bands could muster... modest in approach but very satisfying in execution, practically defining the phrase "happy accident.""

== Track listing ==
All songs by Michael Nesmith.

1. "Tomorrow & Me" – 3:45
2. "The Upside of Good-Bye" – 2:56
3. "Lady Love" – 2:50
4. "Listening" – 2:23
5. "Two Different Roads" – 2:39
6. "The Candidate" – 2:35
7. "Different Drum" – 2:58
8. "Harmony Constant" – 3:48
9. "Keep On" – 3:30
10. "Roll with the Flow" – 5:08

== Personnel ==
- Michael Nesmith – vocals, guitar
- Red Rhodes – pedal steel guitar
- James O'Rafferty – guitar (uncredited)
- Unknown – keyboards
