= Nymph (1973 film) =

1973 film by William Dear

- Theatrical release poster
- Directed by: William Dear
- Written by: Kensinger Jones
- Produced by: Tom Blanchard
- Starring: Peggy Kramer; Burton Dunning; Jack Donachie
- Cinematography: Patrick Craigen
- Edited by: Chuck Wharton
- Distributed by: Jack H. Harris Enterprises, Inc.
- Release date: December 3, 1973
- Running time: 80 minutes
- Country: United States
- Language: English

Nymph is a 1973 sexploitation film directed by William Dear, in his feature film directorial debut.

== Plot ==
Tommy Harris and his girlfriend C.J. travel to Northern Michigan to find his father Carl, a World War II veteran on a deer hunting trip with his friends.

== Cast ==
- Peggy Kramer as C.J.
- Burton Dunning as Tommy Harris
- Jack Donachie as Carl Harris
- Bob Charlton as Pat Armistead
- Henry A. Houston as Bob Neely
- Ed Oldani as Dick
- Jim Marsh as Ed
- Russ Blanchard as Len
- John Garrett as Mac
