= Tropical Campfires =

Studio album by Michael Nesmith
- Released: 1992
- Recorded: July 1992
- Genre: Tropical rock
- Length: 58:02
- Label: Pacific Arts
- Producer: Michael Nesmith

Michael Nesmith chronology
The Older Stuff (1991)	Tropical Campfires (1992)	Complete First National Band Recordings (1993)

Professional ratings
Review scores
Source	Rating
Allmusic	4/5 stars

Tropical Campfires, originally known as Tropical Campfire's, is an album by Michael Nesmith released in 1992 after Nesmith's 13-year hiatus from making studio albums. It is the 9th and final Nesmith album to feature guitarist Red Rhodes, who died in 1995.

Allmusic writes that "Along with Lindsey Buckingham's Out of the Cradle, this album may be one of the finest and most underrated albums of the 1990s."

The seemingly incorrect original spelling of the album's title comes from an excerpt printed inside the CD booklet: "Now she must navigate by the southwestern tropical campfire's mambo raga songs, their sounds rising from the desert floor ..." The original 1992 CD on Pacific Arts reads "campfire's" but the 2001 and 2008 reissues have the apostrophe missing from the cover artwork.

All versions of this album were released encoded in the Dolby Digital Pro-Logic surround sound format.

== Track listing ==
All songs written by Michael Nesmith except where otherwise noted.

1. "Yellow Butterfly" – 5:22
2. "Laugh Kills Lonesome" – 4:12
3. "Moon Over the Rio Grande" – 5:58
4. "One... " – 5:19
5. "Juliana" – 6:09
6. "Brazil" (Bob Russell, Ary Barroso, Russell Sidney) – 5:35
7. "In the Still of the Night" (Cole Porter) – 3:09
8. "Rising in Love" – 4:42
9. "Begin the Beguine" (Cole Porter) – 5:18
10. "I Am Not That" – 2:45
11. "...for the Island" – 5:18
12. "Twilight on the Trail" – 4:28

== Personnel ==
- Michael Nesmith – guitar, vocals, liner notes
- Joe Chemay – bass, background vocals
- John Jorgenson – guitar, mandolin, background vocals
- John Hobbs – keyboards, background vocals
- Red Rhodes – guitar, pedal steel guitar
- Luis Conte – percussion
- Nelson Stump – cowbell
- Robbie Sneddon – percussion, harp

Production notes

- Michael Nesmith – producer
- Mike McDonald – engineer
- Peter Rynston – mastering
- Jeff Adamoff – art direction
- Henry Diltz – photography
- Val Jennings – project coordinator
- Jeff Lancaster – design
- Stan Watts – illustrations
