= Pretty Much Your Standard Ranch Stash =

Studio album by Michael Nesmith
- Released: September 1973
- Recorded: March 12–16, 1973
- Studio: RCA's Music Center of the World (Hollywood)
- Genre: Country rock
- Length: 31:26
- Label: RCA Victor
- Producer: Michael Nesmith

Michael Nesmith chronology
And the Hits Just Keep on Comin' (1972)	Pretty Much Your Standard Ranch Stash (1973)	The Prison: A Book with a Soundtrack (1974)

Professional ratings
Review scores
Source	Rating
Allmusic	4.5/5 stars

Pretty Much Your Standard Ranch Stash is American singer-songwriter Michael Nesmith's sixth album of his post-Monkees career. Released in September 1973, it was his final album for RCA Records and did not chart.

"Some of Shelly's Blues" was written by Nesmith as a potential Monkees release during his 1968 Nashville sessions. That version remained unissued until the 1990s. "Some of Shelly's Blues" was also recorded previously by the Stone Poneys and by the Nitty Gritty Dirt Band on their 1970 album Uncle Charlie & His Dog Teddy.

The track "Winonah" marks the first time that Nesmith collaborated on a song with other writers since 1966 on the Monkees song "The Kind of Girl I Could Love" (featured on the album More of the Monkees).

On the cover of the album, in small print, are the words "buy this record". On the CD, the words have been altered to "buy this compact disc".

Pretty Much Your Standard Ranch Stash was Nesmith's final album for RCA Records. The album, was later re-released on the Pacific Arts label and subsequently on CD by multiple labels. It was reissued coupled with And the Hits Just Keep on Comin' by RCA/BMG in 2000.

== Track listing ==
1. "Continuing" (Michael Nesmith) – 3:55
2. "Some of Shelly's Blues" (Michael Nesmith) – 3:21
3. "Release" (Michael Nesmith) – 3:49
4. "Winonah" (Michael Nesmith, Linda Hargrove, James Miner) – 3:56
5. "Born to Love You" (Cindy Walker) – 3:55
6. "The Back Porch and a Fruit Jar Full of Iced Tea" – 8:19
  1. a. "The F.F.V" (Traditional; arranged by Michael Nesmith)
  2. b. "Uncle Pen" (Bill Monroe)
7. "Prairie Lullaby (Billy Hill)" – 4:12

== Personnel ==
- Michael Nesmith – vocals, acoustic rhythm 12-string guitar
- Jay Lacy – electric guitar
- Dr. Robert K. Warford – electric guitar, banjo
- David Barry – piano
- Red Rhodes – pedal steel, dobro
- Billy Graham – bass, fiddle
- Danny Lane – drums and percussion
