= Television Parts =

American comedy-variety TV series created by Michael Nesmith

- Also known as: Michael Nesmith in Television Parts
- Written by: Jack Handey, William Martin, Michael Kaplan, John Levenstein
- Directed by: Micky Dolenz, William Dear, Alan Myerson, Michael Nesmith
- Presented by: Michael Nesmith
- Starring: Michael Nesmith, Garry Shandling, Jay Leno, Jerry Seinfeld, Whoopi Goldberg, Arsenio Hall, Jerry Lee Lewis, Rosanne Cash, Martin Mull, Jimmy Buffett
- Country of origin: United States
- Original language: English

Production
- Executive producer: Michael Nesmith
- Producer: Ward Sylvester

Original release
- Network: NBC
- Release: 1 March – 27 July 1985

Related
- PopClips; Elephant Parts

Michael Nesmith in Television Parts is a television series aired by NBC in 1985. It was a 30-minute comedy-variety series created by Michael Nesmith as a continuation of his Grammy Award-winning video production Elephant Parts, and earlier series PopClips. The first episode was a stand-alone television special which aired on March 1, 1985. The following series premiered on June 14, 1985.

The show was a mix of music videos (by both Nesmith and others) mixed in with comedy sketches, commercial parodies, and general silliness. It was hosted by Nesmith himself, who also participated in many of the sketches. Television Parts also featured guest appearances by a number of comedians, including Martin Mull, Whoopi Goldberg, Jay Leno, Jerry Seinfeld, Bill Martin, The Funny Boys and Garry Shandling, whose appearance on the show was the seed for It's Garry Shandling's Show. One of the show's featured pieces, "Deep Thoughts by Jack Handey" was later picked up by Saturday Night Live.

The show was cancelled after 5 episodes. The last episode was 90 minutes, and ran in the Saturday Night Live time-slot. It returned in 1985 as two separate home video releases on VHS and Betamax, Television Parts Home Companion (July 12, 1985) and Dr. Duck's Super Secret All-Purpose Sauce (July 19, 1985). The first was a 40-minute compilation featuring the comedy skits and music by Michael Nesmith only. Dr. Duck's Super Secret All-Purpose Sauce was a 90-minute montage of sketch comedy with a variety of stars and music videos, with none by Nesmith. The stars included Bobcat Goldthwait, Ed Begley, Jr., Jimmy Buffett, Rosanne Cash, Whoopi Goldberg, Jay Leno, Jerry Seinfeld and Garry Shandling.
