= Jac Holzman =

American businessman (born 1931)

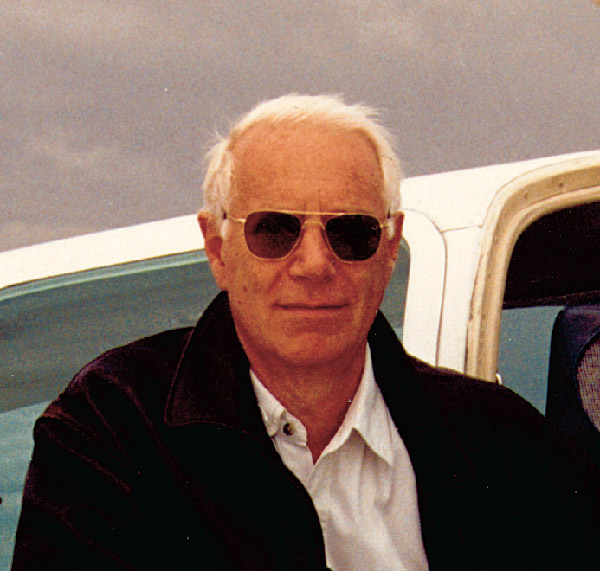
- Jac Holzman in 2010
- Born: September 15, 1931 (age 95)
- Occupation: Record executive
- Title: Founder and former CEO of Elektra Records
- Children: 3, including Adam Holzman

Jac Holzman (born September 15, 1931) is an American record executive. He is the founder of the record labels Elektra Records and Nonesuch Records. Holzman helped commercially launch the CD and home video formats, as well as the pilot program which became MTV. He was inducted into the Rock and Roll Hall of Fame in 2011.

== Early life ==
Holzman was born to a Jewish family, the son of a Manhattan doctor. He founded Elektra Entertainment as a small independent folk label in his St. John's College dormitory room in 1950, with $600 ($8,029 in 2025 dollars). That same year, the first record released was New Songs by John Gruen, initially a flop but a big learning lesson; 500 copies were pressed with fewer than a quarter of them sold. He held amateur radio callsign K2VEH around this time. In 1968, he approved Elektra Records' Paxton Lodge, the experimental recording studio where Jackson Browne first recorded. By 1957, Elektra was $90,000 in debt ($1.03 million in 2025 dollars), but finally found success with folk artist Theodore Bikel.

== Career ==
He signed such acts as the Doors, Queen (US only), Love, Josh White, Tim Buckley, Carly Simon, the Stooges, MC5, Harry Chapin, and Bread to Elektra and discovered folk singer Judy Collins. In 1964, Holzman served as executive producer for 13 stock sound effect libraries titled Authentic Sound Effects which generated $1.5 million ($15.6 million in 2025 dollars) in sales giving Elektra further financial security; that same year he also founded Nonesuch Records as a classical music budget label. In 1970, he merged his music interests with Warner Communications (then known as Kinney International) over a $10 million deal ($82.9 million in 2025 dollars) and continued his association with the labels he created for three additional years. While a part of the Warner Music Group, Holzman helped to establish both the WEA Distributing Corp (Warner-Elektra-Atlantic Distributing Corp) and WEA International.

In 1973, Holzman was appointed senior vice president and chief technologist for WCI. Holzman guided the company into home video and the first interactive cable television system, QUBE. Until 1972, he was a director of Pioneer Electronics Japan, helping that company, and Warner Bros., adopt the compact disc and Laserdisc. Holzman was a member of the board of Atari, one of the first video game companies, which was acquired by WCI in 1976; during this time the revolutionary Atari 2600 was released.

In 1979, Holzman became the nexus between ex-Monkee Michael Nesmith and John Lack of Warner Cable. He persuaded Lack to meet with Nesmith who had been nursing an idea for a program he called PopClips. Holzman thought that Nesmith's notion of building a TV structure around that idea made real sense.

In 1982, following the death of president and founder Robert Gottschalk, Holzman took charge of Panavision, a wholly owned subsidiary of Warner Bros. Discovery and turned that financially troubled company around.

In 1986, he formed FirstMedia, an investment firm which acquired Cinema Products Corporation, the maker of the Oscar-winning Steadicam camera stabilization system.

In 1991, through FirstMedia, Holzman acquired the Discovery, Trend and Musicraft jazz labels from the estate of Albert Marx, which was also acquired by Warner Music Group in 1993.

After Edgar Bronfman Jr. and a group of investors acquired Warner Music Group from Time Warner Inc. in 2004, Bronfman brought Holzman back to WMG, reuniting him with the company that he had helped to found with Ahmet Ertegun and Mo Ostin. Although Holzman's work at Warner Music covers a range from mentoring executives and future planning, his first project was the creation of an on-line label, Cordless Recordings, introduced in late 2005. Cordless gave bands space to hone their art and grow without the expectations and cash outlays associated with a major label.

=== Current ===
In April 2016, Steve Cooper, CEO of Warner Music Group, announced Jac Holzman as the Senior Technology Advisor to WMG: "a wide-ranging technology 'scout', exploring new digital developments and identifying possible partners."

In June 2018, Holzman launched a new venture named "Cosmic Ringtones & Sonic Realms... Your Universe Is Calling". Curated and produced by Holzman, the collection included a series of instrumental pieces composed, performed, and recorded by his son Adam. The album was released on Holzman's FM Group Music label, distributed by ADA.

== Awards and honours ==
In 2008, Holzman received the NARAS Grammy Trustees Award.

On December 15, 2010, it was announced that Holzman would be awarded the Ahmet Ertegun Award (along with Specialty Records founder Art Rupe) by the Rock and Roll Hall of Fame.

Holzman was inducted into the non-performer category of the Rock and Roll Hall of Fame on March 14, 2011, with the induction speech given by Doors member John Densmore.

== Personal life ==
Holzman is the father of Adam Holzman, a jazz-rock keyboardist who has played with Miles Davis; Jaclyn Easton, a writer and Internet entrepreneur; and Marin Sander-Holzman, an editor and filmmaker.

In 1973 he built a home in Hawaii, after Elektra merged with Warner. The move was inspired by the film Holiday, where at that time he was mostly reading instead of listening to music.

== Works ==
- Holzman, Jac; Daws, Gavan (1998). Follow the Music: The Life and High Times of Elektra Records in the Great Years of American Pop Culture (PDF) (1st ed.). Santa Monica, Calif.: FirstMedia Books. ISBN 9780966122114.

== See also ==
- Follow the Music
- Elektra Sound Recorders
