= Infinite Rider on the Big Dogma =

Studio album by Michael Nesmith
- Released: May 1979
- Genre: Pop rock
- Length: 38:15 (40:25 with longer version of "Flying")
- Label: Pacific Arts
- Producer: Michael Nesmith

Michael Nesmith chronology
Live At The Palais (1978)	Infinite Rider on the Big Dogma (1979)	The Newer Stuff (1989)

Infinite Rider on the Big Dogma (or simply, Infinite Rider) is an album by the American musician Michael Nesmith, released in 1979. It was the third studio album from his own company, Pacific Arts Records & Tapes. To continue developing Pacific Arts' multimedia projects, Nesmith originally developed the album as a "video album" (however, to date, Infinite Rider has only been released as a music album). It peaked at No. 151 on the Billboard Pop albums charts. The album was well received with both "Cruisin’” and "Factions" garnering significant airplay during July and August 1979 on Album Oriented Rock radio stations.

Each track on Infinite Rider has only one word in its title. Yet, on the LP and unique inner sleeve, Nesmith listed each song with a parenthetical subtitle for each track.

Although the album was never released on video, Nesmith has released the album on compact disc. Several songs from the album have been produced as music videos, however, which were featured in Nesmith's Elephant Parts "video album".

== Promotional materials ==
To promote the release of Infinite Rider, Pacific Arts released a promotional album entitled "The Michael Nesmith Radio Special". The promotional album intertwines an interview with Nesmith and the anticipated slate of songs for his then-forthcoming album.

== Critical reception ==
Professional ratings
Review scores
Source	Rating
AllMusic	4/5 stars
Christgau's Record Guide	B−

The Courier Journal determined that Infinite Rider on the Big Dogma is "interesting only in the fact that the sound of the album is about the fullest and most produced since '60s Phil Spector."

== Track listing ==
All songs written by Michael Nesmith except "Capsule," which was written by Michael Nesmith, Al Perkins, David Mackay, Paul Leim, John Hobbs and Lenny Castro.

=== Tracks ===
1. "Dance" – 2:32
2. "Magic" – 3:42
3. "Tonite" – 3:56
4. "Flying" – 4:46 (long version - 6:56)
5. "Carioca" – 4:06
6. "Cruisin'" – 3:51
7. "Factions" – 3:24
8. "Light" – 3:21
9. "Horserace" – 3:21
10. "Capsule" – 5:16

=== Parenthetical Titles ===
1. "Dance (Dance & Have a Good Time)" – 2:32
2. "Magic (This Night Is Magic)" – 3:42
3. "Tonite (The Television Song)" – 3:56
4. "Flying (Silks & Satins)" – 4:46 (long version - 6:56)
5. "Carioca (Blue Carioca)" – 4:06
6. "Cruisin' (Lucy and Ramona and Sunset Sam)" – 3:51
7. "Factions (The Daughter of Rock n' Roll)" – 3:24
8. "Light (The Eclectic Light)" – 3:21
9. "Horserace (Beauty and Magnum Force)" – 3:21
10. "Capsule (Hello People a Hundred Years from Now)" – 5:16

Bonus tracks only available for download on Michael Nesmith's Videoranch:

- "Walkin' in the Sand" - 3:09
- "Rollin'" - 3:30

== Music videos ==
The following videos were produced from Infinite Rider:

- Magic
- Tonight
- Carioca
- Cruisin'
- Light

== Personnel ==
Musical

- Michael Nesmith – lead and backing vocals, rhythm and lead guitars
- Al Perkins – lead and slide guitars
- John Hobbs – keyboards, backing vocals
- Paul Leim – drums
- David MacKay – bass guitar
- Lenny Castro – percussion
- Joe Chemay – backing vocals
- Tom Saviano – saxophones

Technical

- Michael Nesmith – producer, arranger
- Joe Chemay – arranger
- William Bottrell – engineer, mixing assistant
- Tom Trefethen – engineer, mixing
- Charles Bush – photography
- Jerry Takigawa – art direction, design, hand tinting
