= Timerider: The Adventure of Lyle Swann =

1982 science fiction action film

- Timerider: The Adventure of Lyle Swann theatrical poster
- Directed by: William Dear
- Written by: Michael Nesmith; William Dear
- Produced by: William Dear
- Starring: Fred Ward; Peter Coyote; Belinda Bauer; Ed Lauter; Tracey Walter; L. Q. Jones; Richard Masur; Chris Mulkey; Michael Nesmith; Macon McCalman
- Cinematography: Larry Pizer
- Edited by: R.J. Kizer
- Music by: Michael Nesmith
- Production companies: Passage Films; Paragon Motion Pictures; Zoomo Production
- Distributed by: Jensen Farley Pictures; Twentieth Century-Fox International Classics
- Release dates: December 11, 1982 (premiere); January 21, 1983
- Running time: 94 minutes
- Country: United States
- Box office: $3.6 million

Timerider: The Adventure of Lyle Swann is a 1982 American science fiction Western film directed by William Dear. The film stars Fred Ward as Lyle Swann, a cross country dirt bike racer in the 1980s who is mistakenly sent back in time to 1877. The film was scored and produced by Michael Nesmith, who also co-wrote the script with Dear.

== Plot ==
Lyle Swann is a well-known dirt bike motorcycle racer who is in the desert competing in the Baja 1000, a multiclass vehicle cross-country race. Swann has a reputation for being a great rider but is plagued by technical problems from the high-tech gadgetry he incorporates into his C and J framed XT500 Yamaha. When Swann accidentally goes far off course, he stumbles across a time travel experiment that utilizes "maser velocity acceleration" to send objects (in this case, a simian subject by the name of Esther G.) back in time.

Swann rides through the field and gets sent back to November 5, 1877. The scientists in charge of the experiment soon realize what has happened, but Swann rides off, unaware of what has happened to him, before he can be returned to the present. While taking a swim break in a local pond, he runs into a gang of outlaws led by Porter Reese, who becomes obsessed with stealing Swann's motorcycle, and the outlaws pursue Swann into the small village of San Marcos, but his red suit and dirtbike scare the local Mexicans, who think he is 'El Diablo' (Spanish for 'The Devil').

There, he meets a beautiful woman, Claire Cygne, who gives him a safe place to hide, and who severely wounds one of Reese's men Carl Dorsett. The village priest compels them to withdraw, but Reese continues to plot the capture of Swann's dirtbike. In the village, Swann is seduced by Claire (at gun point) and sleeps with her, but she is later kidnapped by Reese's henchman Claude Dorsett as revenge for her shooting and wounding his brother Carl.

They also manage to capture the dirtbike, leading to a series of hijinks, while Swann gets help from a posse of two U.S. Marshals, Potter and Daniels, who are trying to capture or kill the gang. Potter has a personal vendetta against Reese, for Reese killed Potter's son two years previously. Swann manages to retrieve his dirtbike and rescue Claire. Potter is killed by Reese in an ambush, and Daniels is mortally wounded and dies later.

In a final showdown, Reese's band of outlaws faces Swann, the last survivor of the posse, and Claire atop a plateau. When a helicopter shows up (sent by the builders of the time travel experiment to take Swann home), Reese's men run away in fear, but Reese stays behind and fires at the helicopter, killing or wounding one of the pilots. The helicopter begins spinning wildly as the co-pilot tries to maintain control, knocking the dirtbike off the side of the plateau. Reese is killed by the helicopter's tail rotor. The helicopter manages to land on the plateau and extract Swann.

Just as the helicopter pulls away, Claire snatches a pendant from Swann's neck that was handed down from his great-great-grandmother, who had stolen it from his great-great grandfather as a reminder of "one incredible night they had together." Swann realizes that he is his own great-great-grandfather.

== Main cast ==
- Fred Ward as Lyle Swann
- Belinda Bauer as Claire Cygne
- Peter Coyote as Porter Reese
- Richard Masur as Claude Dorsett
- Tracey Walter as Carl Dorsett
- Ed Lauter as Padre Quinn
- L. Q. Jones as Ben Potter American marshal
- Chris Mulkey as Daniels, 2nd American marshal
- Macon McCalman as Dr. Sam
- Michael Nesmith as Race Official

== Production ==
=== Screenplay ===
The off-screen dialogue (narrated by Macon McCalman) heard over the opening credits explains the time travel experiment as having the goal of sending a rhesus monkey to the year 1862 (according to the inscription on the canister containing the monkey which Swann reads aloud, the experiment begins on November 4, 1982). After Swann stumbles into the experiment, the scientists in charge of the experiment determine that Swann and the monkey were sent to about "1875," then later pinpoint the date as being November 5, 1877. The screenplay's "time travel arrival day" of November 5 had first appeared in 1979's Time After Time; and was also the "time travel arrival day" in a later film, 1985's Back to the Future. As another plot clue, Claire's last name, Cygne, is the vocative singular form of "cygnus," Latin for "swan."

In addition to the grandfather paradox and the predestination paradox presented in the film, the necklace that Claire takes from Lyle presents an ontological paradox (i.e., an object with no creation point and continually in the time-loop), similar to the pocket watch in the 1980 time-travel film Somewhere in Time. These paradoxes were highlighted in the 2004 South Park episode "Goobacks," where various time-traveling techniques in movies are compared.

The film's screenplay was written by Michael Nesmith, a member of the band The Monkees. The movie is produced by Zoomo Production, which is a subsidiary of Michael Nesmith's Pacific Arts Corporation. The movie was also released by Pacific Arts Video, another entity of Nesmith's, who appears briefly as one of the Baja 1000 officials in the beginning of the film.

== DVD release with alternate version ==
Two brief scenes were cut from the above theatrical version for the 2001 Anchor Bay Entertainment DVD release:

- The scene where the time experiment scientists pinpoint Swann's exact day in the past as being November 5, 1877, is missing.
- The scene where Reese is struck by the rescue helicopter's tail rotor, leaving only his sheared off, bloody feet and boots is missing. Instead, the original sound effects remain, and a shot of Reese cowering on the ground is inserted.

Shout! Factory released the film on Blu-ray on March 19, 2013. It has since gone out-of-print.

== Critical reception ==
Upon its theatrical release, Vincent Canby of The New York Times commented, "At the point at which I walked out, about 55 minutes into the story, there hadn't been a single characterization, situation, line of dialogue, camera angle or joke to indicate that anyone connected with Timerider had the remotest idea of what he was doing."

Contemporary critics reviewed the film upon its 2001 DVD release:

Patrick Naugle of DVD Verdict said, "Timerider starts off a bit slow. It seems as if the first twenty minutes are taken up watching Swann ride his bike all over the dry desert plains. After that sluggish beginning, Timerider kicks into a funny and enjoyable fish-out-of-water story."

== Soundtrack ==
Nesmith also produced, wrote, and recorded the Timerider: The Adventure of Lyle Swann soundtrack. Eighteen years after the soundtrack was recorded, it was finally released by Videoranch (the official website and another subsidiary of Nesmith's Pacific Arts).

=== Track listing ===
All music is composed by Michael Nesmith.

No.	Title	Length
1.	"The Baja 1000"	3:13
2.	"Lost in the Weeds"	1:43
3.	"Somewhere Around 1875"	1:06
4.	"Scared to Death"	0:58
5.	"Silks and Sixguns"	0:57
6.	"Dead Man's Duds"	1:28
7.	"Two Swanns at the Pond"	2:20
8.	"I Want That Machine"	0:51
9.	"Escape to San Marcos"	2:24
10.	"Claire's Cabin"	2:01
11.	"No Jurisdiction"	0:54
12.	"Murder at Swallow's Camp"	2:17
13.	"Claire's Rescue"	1:54
14.	"Up the Hill to Nowhere"	3:19
15.	"Out of Ammo"	3:08
16.	"Reprise"	3:31
