= Tantamount to Treason Vol. 1 =

Studio album by Michael Nesmith & The Second National Band
- Released: February 1972
- Genres: Country rock; progressive country
- Length: 37:48
- Label: RCA Victor
- Producer: Michael Nesmith

Michael Nesmith & The Second National Band chronology
Nevada Fighter (1971)	Tantamount to Treason Vol. 1 (1972)	And the Hits Just Keep on Comin' (1972)

Professional ratings
Review scores
Source	Rating
Allmusic	4/5 stars
Christgau's Record Guide	C

Tantamount to Treason Volume 1 (also known as simply Tantamount to Treason) is Michael Nesmith's fourth solo album during his post-Monkees career. Released in 1972, Tantamount to Treason is the only album Michael Nesmith recorded and released with the Second National Band. An assumed sequel (Tantamount to Treason Vol. 2) was said to have been recorded but was never released. Even so, Nesmith has personally stated that a follow-up 'never happened and all rumors are false'.

The band on this release is credited as the Second National Band—the only remaining members from the original First National Band were Nesmith and O.J. "Red" Rhodes. The Second National Band was filled out by Michael Cohen on keyboards (who had played on Nesmith's previous LP Nevada Fighter and on some of Nesmith's Monkees sessions), big-band drummer Jack Ranelli, bassist Johnny Meeks (who had played lead guitar years before with Gene Vincent), and Puerto Rican conga player Jose Feliciano.

The album is celebrated by Nesmith fans for its trippy, almost psychedelic feel. "Lazy Lady" has delay effects and white noise; "You Are My One" features guitar phasing and a long solo section; "In the Afternoon" and "Highway 99" include sound effects. Even the country music standard "She Thinks I Still Care" features a phased steel guitar solo. Nesmith also does his own version of Bill Chadwick's "Talking to the Wall"; Chadwick's own version was recorded under Nesmith's aegis in the late 1960s.

In 2000, Tantamount to Treason was reissued on CD coupled with Nevada Fighter by RCA/BMG International and includes three previously unreleased bonus tracks.

== Beer recipe ==
On the back cover of the LP, there is a recipe for "Papa Nes Home Brew".

== Track listing ==
All songs by Michael Nesmith except where noted.

1. "Mama Rocker" – 3:03
2. "Lazy Lady" – 2:55
3. "You Are My One" – 4:23
4. "In the Afternoon" – 6:01
5. "Highway 99 With Melange" (Michael Cohen) – 5:06
6. "Wax Minute" (Richard Stekol) – 4:38
7. "Bonaparte's Retreat" (Pee Wee King, Redd Stewart) – 4:36
8. "Talking to the Wall" (Bill Chadwick) – 2:57
9. "She Thinks I Still Care" (Dickey Lee, Steve Duffy) – 4:08

== Personnel ==
- Michael Nesmith - six and 12-string electric and acoustic guitars, vocals
- Michael Cohen - keyboards and Moog synthesizer
- Johnny Meeks - bass
- Jack Ranelli - drums
- Red Rhodes - pedal steel guitar
- José Feliciano - congas

Production notes

- Produced by Michael Nesmith
- Engineered by Peter Abbot
- Art direction by Acy Lehman
- Artwork by Wilson McLean
- Design by Frank Mulvey
