= The Garden (Michael Nesmith album) =

Soundtrack album by Michael Nesmith
- Released: 1994
- Recorded: Oct 1991–Sep 1993
- Genre: New-age
- Length: 55:48
- Label: Rio
- Producers: Michael Nesmith and John Hobbs

Michael Nesmith chronology
Complete First National Band Recordings (1993)	The Garden (1994)	Live at the Britt Festival (1999)

The Garden is Michael Nesmith's 11th full studio album and was released in September 1994. The Garden is a companion release to Nesmith's 1974 album/book, The Prison. Both The Garden and The Prison are written to have the music complement a novel included in the release (also written by Nesmith). The Prison and The Garden were re-released together on CD in 2004 by Video Ranch.

The idea is for listeners to read the novel while simultaneously listening to the recording. Even though The Garden was released on Nesmith's record company, Rio Records, the novella/album concept was the driving force behind Nesmith's multimedia company Pacific Arts.

In the liner notes, Nesmith states The Garden is not a sequel in the strictest sense of the term — meaning that there isn't a true continuation of the narrative which began in The Prison. Instead, they are correlated thematically and stylistically as both are presented in a linear and consecutive approach. Each of The Garden's seven chapters are also visually enhanced, if not somewhat inspired by a series of Claude Monet paintings. There is a much more subtle connection between the prose and these unqualified masterworks, yet he is able to relate them in a contextual sense.

The album was Grammy nominated for the best new age album in 1994.

== Reviews ==
Professional ratings
Review scores
Source	Rating
Allmusic	4/5 stars

Allmusic writes "the music retains Nesmith's inimitable and signature sound, yet compared to his most concurrent effort, Tropical Campfires (1992), The Garden is exceedingly ethereal and more often than not instrumental. There are vocals that feature not only the artist, but also his children Jason — who is likewise the central character in the short story — Christian, and Jessica. The backing band also includes Christian Nesmith as well as most of the musicians the senior Nez had collaborated with on the aforementioned Tropical Campfires, most notably Desert Rose Band string man John Jorgenson (guitar/sax/bassoon/mandolin/oboe/bandurila/mandocello), Joe Chemay (bass), and John Hobbs (keyboards), as well as studio maven Sid Page (violin)".

== Production ==
According to the liner notes, the album was recorded at various times between October 1991 and September 1993 at Footprint Studios and Trax in Los Angeles. Additionally, The Garden is the first studio album Nesmith does not use a pedal steel guitar on any track.

The Garden novella features seven paintings of Claude Monet at the beginning of each chapter.

== Track listing ==
All songs written by Michael Nesmith.

1. "Garden's Glow" – 7:29
2. "Ficus Carica" – 5:10
3. "City" – 10:06
4. "Hills of Time" – 7:38
5. "Flowers Dancing" – 6:36
6. "Wisteria" – 11:28
7. "Life Becoming" – 7:21

== Personnel ==
- Michael Nesmith – 12-string acoustic guitar, vocals
- Christian Nesmith – 6-string acoustic guitar
- John Jorgenson – 6-string acoustic and electric guitars, soprano sax, bassoon, mandolin, mandocello, oboe
- John Hobbs – keyboards
- Joe Chemay – bass
- Joe Romano – trumpet
- John Yoakum – oboe, English horn
- Sid Page – violin
- Curt McGetrick – bass clarinet

Production notes

- Michael Nesmith and John Hobbs – producers

== Monet paintings featured in each chapter ==
1. The Artist's Garden of Giverny (1900)
2. A Bend in the Epte River, Near Giverny (1888)
3. Vertheuil in Summertime (1879)
4. Valley of the Petite Creuse (1889)
5. Poppy Field in a Hollow Near Giverny (1885)
6. Wisteria (1920)
7. Waterlilies and Japanese Bridge (1899)
