= The Wichita Train Whistle Sings =

Studio album by The Wichita Train Whistle
- Released: July 1968
- Recorded: November 18–19, 1967
- Studios: RCA Victor (Hollywood, California)
- Genre: Country rock
- Length: 36:54
- Label: Dot Records
- Producer: Michael Nesmith

Michael Nesmith chronology
The Wichita Train Whistle Sings (1968)	Magnetic South (1970)

1977 Pacific Arts reissue cover

Professional ratings
Review scores
Source	Rating
Allmusic	3/5 stars

The Wichita Train Whistle Sings is the de facto first solo album by Michael Nesmith, although the artist credited on the initial release is actually "The Wichita Train Whistle". It was recorded while Nesmith was still a member of the Monkees, and it peaked at No. 144 on the Billboard Pop Albums charts.

The album comprises instrumentals performed by a full orchestra. All but one of the songs were also recorded by the Monkees (although a few of them weren't released until the Monkees' Missing Links albums.)

== Background ==
The album was made over a two-day session on November 18–19, 1967 at the RCA studios in Hollywood, and it featured the best musicians in Hollywood (including many of the key members of "The Wrecking Crew"), including ten trumpets, ten trombones, ten saxophones, two drummers, five percussionists, four pianos, eight basses, seven guitars. Because it was the weekend, all musicians were paid double time and the session was catered by Chasens, the finest restaurant in Hollywood, and Nesmith provided an open bar, with the predictable result that most of the normally highly disciplined cadre of studio musicians were drunk by the time the session finished. It all cost $50,000. Nesmith explained to Hal Blaine that he was about to pay a similar sum in tax and he would rather spend it on the sessions and write it off than give it to the IRS.

The recording is also notable for the famous incident that occurred at the end of the sessions: the lead sheet for the final track recorded ("Don't Call On Me") included an instruction that called for the players to improvise a cacophony of sound; as the track concluded, to the astonishment of his colleagues, renowned guitarist Tommy Tedesco took off his Fender guitar (which was still plugged into the amplifier), threw it high into the air, and the instrument crashed to the floor and smashed to pieces. According to a 2000 interview with Hal Blaine, Tedesco's wife later collected the pieces and had them framed.

The album was initially released with the title Mike Nesmith Presents The Wichita Train Whistle Sings on both the sleeve and record label. The label credited the recording artist as "The Wichita Train Whistle".

In 1977, Nesmith re-released The Wichita Train Whistle Sings through his multimedia company, Pacific Arts (PACB 7–113). Unlike the original Dot Records black background album cover, the Pacific Arts cover had a white background and was dominated with only the album title, which now did not include the Mike Nesmith Presents notation. However, although Nesmith's name did not appear on the front cover of the re-release, the artist credit on the actual record label now read "Michael Nesmith", and not "The Wichita Train Whistle". Subsequent re-issues also credit Nesmith as the artist.

== CD Release ==
When Nesmith reissued "Wichita Train" on compact disc, the album was digitally mastered from an original LP record. As Nesmith explained in the liner notes, the album was intended to be played on vinyl and the dubbing from LP was an attempt to capture the album's original sound.

In 2008, the album was remixed from the original multi-track tapes, re-sequenced by Nesmith and reissued on the Edsel label alongside his Timerider movie soundtrack.

== Track listing ==
All songs by Michael Nesmith except where noted.

1. "Nine Times Blue"
2. "Carlisle Wheeling"
3. "Tapioca Tundra"
4. "Don't Call on Me" (Nesmith, John London)
5. "Don't Cry Now"
6. "While I Cried"
7. "Papa Gene's Blues"
8. "You Just May Be the One"
9. "Sweet Young Thing" (Nesmith, Gerry Goffin, Carole King)
10. "You Told Me"

== Personnel ==
- Michael Nesmith – guitar, bass guitar, arranger
- Don Randi, Larry Knechtel – piano
- Red Rhodes – pedal steel guitar
- Hal Blaine, Earl Palmer – drums
- Doug Dillard – banjo
- Chuck Berghofer – bass guitar
- James Burton, Tommy Tedesco – guitar
- Frank Capp, Gary Coleman, Victor Feldman – percussion
- Nelson Stump – cowbell
- Israel Baker (concertmaster), Robert Barene, Arnold Belnick, Jimmy Getzoff, Leonard Malarsky, Ralph Schaeffer, Sidney Sharp (concertmaster), Tibor Zelig – violin
- Joe DiFiore, Harry Hyams, Alexander Neiman – viola
- Jesse Ehrlich, Ray Kramer, Edgar Lustgarten – cello
- Gene Cipriano, Justin Gordon, Jim Horn, Jules Jacob, John E. Lowe, Jack Nimitz – saxophones and other woodwinds
- John Audino, Bud Brisbois, Jules Chaikin, Buddy Childers, Manny Klein, Oliver Mitchell, Tony Terran, Jimmy Zito – trumpet
- Milt Bernhart, Lou Blackburn, Joe Howard, Dick Hyde, Lou McCreary, Barrett O'Hara, Kenny Shroyer – trombone
- Jim Decker, Vincent DeRosa, Bill Hinshaw, Richard Perissi – French horns
- Sam Rice, John Kitzmiller – tuba

== Production notes ==
- Michael Nesmith – producer, arranger
- Hank Cicalo – engineer
- Israel Baker – concertmaster
- Shorty Rogers – arranger, conductor
- Sid Sharp – concert master
- Jerry Takigawa — Album cover design
