= PopClips =

- Genre: Music television
- Created by: Michael Nesmith
- Developed by: Michael Nesmith; William Dear
- Directed by: William Dear
- Presented by: Howie Mandel; Jack Armstrong; Jeff Michalski; Charles Fleischer; Bill Martin
- Country of origin: United States
- Original language: English
- No. of seasons: 1
- No. of episodes: 30

Production
- Executive producer: Michael Nesmith
- Producer: Jac Holzman
- Running time: 30 minutes
- Production company: Warner-Amex Satellite Entertainment

Original release
- Network: Nickelodeon
- Release: 1980 – 1981

Related
- Elephant Parts; Television Parts; MTV; Nick Rocks

PopClips is a music video television program, the direct predecessor of MTV.

Former Monkee Mike Nesmith conceived the first music-video program as a promotional device for Warner Communications' record division. Production began in the spring of 1979 at SamFilm, a sound-stage built and operated in Sand City, California by Sam Harrison, a Monterey Peninsula College instructor with a motion picture background. The series was produced by Jac Holzman.

With an infinity cyclorama as the background, set flats were made from the Styrofoam packing used to ship laserdisc players and 3/4" video decks. The first "VeeJay" was Jeff Michalski. The director was William Dear. Besides Harrison, the production team was made up of Bruce "Buz" Clarke, Keith Cornell, Marybeth Harris, and Leslie Chacon.

The program was broadcast weekly on the youth-oriented cable television channel Nickelodeon in late 1980 and early 1981. The channel's owners at the time, Warner Cable, wanted to buy the name and idea, but instead, according to Dear, "they just watered down the idea and came up with MTV."

PopClips was preceded by the video Elephant Parts (which won the first ever Grammy Award for Music Video), and followed by a second series titled Television Parts, both of which Nesmith hosted and produced.
