= Elephant Parts =

1981 American film

- Directed by: William Dear
- Written by: Michael Nesmith
- Produced by: Michael Nesmith
- Music by: Fred Myrow
- Distributed by: Pacific Arts
- Release date: July 1, 1981
- Running time: 62 minutes (VHS, DVD); 60 minutes (LaserDisc)
- Country: United States
- Language: English

Elephant Parts is a collection of comedy sketches and music videos made in 1981 by Michael Nesmith, formerly of the Monkees. Nesmith produced the video through his company Pacific Arts. Elephant Parts is one-hour-long with parody commercials and comedy sketches, and features five full-length music videos, including the popular songs "Rio" and "Cruisin'", which featured wrestler Steve Strong and Monterey-based comic "Chicago" Steve Barkley.

== Overview ==
There are various comedy sketches between musical numbers: The most notable sketches are "Elvis Drugs", "Neighborhood Nuclear Superiority", "The Tragically Hip" (which was the inspiration for the Canadian band the Tragically Hip and was featured as a pretaped sketch on a season six episode of Saturday Night Live), "Large Detroit Car Company", "Mariachi Translations", recurring comic blackouts that ended with the catchphrase "Just to prove a point!" and several series of bits with a lounge singer and a pirate, as well as a game show called "Name That Drug." The musical videos include "Magic", "Cruisin'", "Light," "Tonight" and "Rio." Director Bill Dear said they were doing "music videos before people even knew what they were... we approached them as mini-movies.... We always tried to tell a story and we looked for a lighter interpretation."

Throughout Elephant Parts, Nesmith references some of his own works, with segments including a parody of his song "Joanne" called "Rodan", and comic promos for his albums Live at the Palais and Infinite Rider on the Big Dogma. Although Nesmith's solo career is mentioned, Elephant Parts contains no references to the Monkees.

Elephant Parts won the first Grammy in the Music Video category. Billboard's review said it was "the cleverest exercise in original video programming to date."

Two related series were PopClips for Nickelodeon, which premiered in 1980, and Television Parts for NBC in 1985. Nickelodeon's parent company, Warner Cable, wanted to buy outright the PopClips copyright to be expanded into an all-music video channel, but after Nesmith declined the offer, Warner Cable started work on what would become MTV.

The title Elephant Parts refers to the parable of the blind men and an elephant where each man comes to a different conclusion about what an elephant is, due to touching only one part.

== Releases ==
Elephant Parts was released on VHS (stereo) and Betamax (mono) in 1981. It was ninth on Billboard's Top Videocassette Sales for 1981.

It was later released on LaserDisc and CED and was the third best-selling video laser disk in 1982, behind Star Wars and Close Encounters of the Third Kind.

When Elephant Parts was first released on LaserDisc in 1981, Nesmith recorded an esoteric commentary track which did not describe the content of the video. Later, Nesmith recorded a new commentary track which does describe the content, included as part of a DVD version released in 2003.

== See also ==
- Television Parts
