= Live at the Britt Festival =

Live album by Michael Nesmith
- Released: 1999
- Recorded: June 19, 1992
- Venue: The Britt Festival, Jacksonville, Jacksonville, Oregon
- Genre: Country rock
- Label: Cooking Vinyl
- Producer: Michael Nesmith

Michael Nesmith chronology
The Garden (1994)	Live at the Britt Festival (1999)	Timerider: The Adventure of Lyle Swann (soundtrack) (2000)

Professional ratings
Review scores
Source	Rating
Allmusic	3.4/5 stars

Live at the Britt Festival is a live album by Michael Nesmith, released in 1999. It was recorded live at the Britt Festival in Jacksonville, Oregon, on June 19, 1992. To prepare for the concert, Nesmith conducted a limited U.S. tour which featured a similar set list as the Britt Festival.

The performance was Nesmith's last with longtime collaborator and pedal steel guitarist Red Rhodes, who died on August 20, 1995.

The album features Nesmith singing a Monkees song, "Papa Gene's Blues" (originally from the album The Monkees, a rare occurrence from Nesmith as a solo artist).

== Track listing ==
All songs written by Michael Nesmith except as otherwise noted.

1. "Two Different Roads" – 3:49
2. "Papa Gene's Blues" – 4:50
3. "Propinquity (I've Just Begun to Care)" – 5:53
4. "Some of Shelly's Blues" – 3:17
5. "Joanne" – 6:52
6. "Tomorrow and Me" – 4:24
7. "The Upside of Goodbye" – 3:32
8. "Harmony Constant" – 4:22
9. "Silver Moon" – 5:05
10. "5 Second Concerts" (Hobbs, Nesmith) – 1:53
11. "Yellow Butterfly" – 5:52
12. "Moon over the Rio Grande" – 5:43
13. "Juliana" – 6:07
14. "Laugh Kills Lonesome" – 4:00
15. "I Am Not That" – 2:31
16. "Rising in Love" – 4:34
17. "Rio" – 5:50
18. "Different Drum" – 2:40
19. "I Am Not That (Reprise)" – 2:43

== Personnel ==
- Michael Nesmith – vocals, guitar, liner notes
- Red Rhodes – pedal steel guitar
- Joe Chemay – bass
- Luis Conte – percussion
- John Hobbs – keyboards
- John Jorgenson – guitar

Production notes

- Mike McDonald – mixing
- Lee Collett – audio supervisor
- Craig Kelly – hand held camera operator
- Scott Jonas – hand held camera operator
