= The Prison: A Book with a Soundtrack =

Soundtrack album by Michael Nesmith
- Released: November 1974
- Genre: Progressive country
- Length: 49:10
- Label: Pacific Arts
- Producer: Michael Nesmith

Michael Nesmith chronology
Pretty Much Your Standard Ranch Stash (1973)	The Prison: A Book with a Soundtrack (1974)	From a Radio Engine to the Photon Wing (1977)

The Prison - A Book with a Soundtrack (or simply The Prison) is Michael Nesmith's seventh solo album of his post-Monkees career and his first to be released under his own record label, Pacific Arts. It includes a novella meant to be read while listening to the album as its "soundtrack". The novella is in English and French. Nesmith recorded a companion novella/album entitled The Garden, released in 1994. According to Nesmith's website (Videoranch), a third installment titled The Ocean was released in 2015 and completes the Infinitia trilogy

The Prison and The Garden were re-released together on CD in 2004 by Video Ranch.

== Critical reception ==
Allmusic called The Prison "a brilliant multimedia concept marrying the personal and inner visual experience of Michael "Papa Nez" Nesmith's novella with the aural medium of an equally original soundtrack." Robert Christgau called it a "ghastly boxed audio-allegory-with-book."

Professional ratings
Review scores
Source	Rating
Allmusic	3/5 stars

== Remixes ==
"The Prison" was dramatically remixed by Michael Nesmith for CD release on "Rio Records" in 1990, and again in 2007 on "Edsel Records". Some changes on both remixes include the removal or addition of drum machines, extra reverb on vocals (in the case of the 2007 remix, a new or alternate lead vocal track in places), and many other changes.

Although the iTunes download of "The Prison" is credited in the iTunes store as the 1990 remix, it is actually the 2007 remix. As of September 2013, the original mix that appeared on vinyl has not been officially released on CD. However, according to Videoranch.com, on "Wednesday, August 16, 2017, Nez opened up a sealed box set [of "The Prison"] from 1974" and proceeded to digitally transfer sides one and two, taking it "off the record completely flat - straight wire. All that can be heard is what he created four decades ago." This digital transfer is currently available to download from Videoranch.com - as individual MP3 files ($1.99 each) or as one long continuous MP3 file ($9.99) at 320 kbps.

== Track listing ==
All songs by Michael Nesmith.

1. "Opening Theme (Life, the Unsuspecting Captive)" – 3:31
2. "Dance Between the Raindrops" – 6:47
3. "Elusive Ragings" – 5:11
4. "Waking Mystery" – 7:36
5. "Hear Me Calling?" – 4:51
6. "Marie's Theme" – 11:51
7. "Closing Theme (Lampost)" – 9:23

== Personnel ==
- Michael Nesmith - vocals and guitars
- David Kempton - Arp Odyssey
- Red Rhodes - pedal steel guitar
- Michael Cohen - keyboard
- Chura - congas
- Roland Rhythm 77 - drums
