= Rio (Michael Nesmith song) =

Single by Michael Nesmith

from the album From a Radio Engine to the Photon Wing
- Released: 1977
- Recorded: 1977
- Songwriter: Michael Nesmith
- Producer: Michael Nesmith

"Rio" is a song written and sung by American musician Michael Nesmith. Included on his 1977 album From a Radio Engine to the Photon Wing, it was released as a single. Although the single was not a hit in the US, "Rio" became Nesmith's most successful solo single in other countries.

Popular interest in the song's music video rather than the song itself led Nesmith to consider creating television programming consisting of music videos. Nesmith sent a proposal he called "Popclips", which was picked up by then cable television operator Nickelodeon. In a 2013 interview published in Rolling Stone, Nesmith said of the "Rio" music video, "I said to people, 'It's a promotional film' ... The answer was that I simply needed to complete the equation. 'Radio is to records as television is to video.' Then it was like, 'Of course!' and thus MTV was born."

== Charts ==
Chart (1977)	Peak position
Australia (Kent Music Report)	4
Netherlands (Single Top 100)	20
New Zealand (Recorded Music NZ)	4
UK Singles (OCC)	28
