= Nevada Fighter =

Studio album by Michael Nesmith & The First National Band
- Released: May 1971
- Recorded: October 1970 – January 1971
- Genre: Country rock
- Length: 30:28
- Label: RCA Victor
- Producer: Michael Nesmith

Michael Nesmith & The First National Band chronology
Loose Salute (1970)	Nevada Fighter (1971)	Tantamount to Treason Vol. 1 (1972)

Professional ratings
Review scores
Source	Rating
Allmusic	3/5 stars
Christgau's Record Guide	C+

Nevada Fighter is the third solo album by American singer-songwriter Michael Nesmith during his post-Monkees career. The album is also the third and final album with Nesmith backed by the First National Band. Released by RCA Records in 1971, the LP failed to chart in the top 200, reaching No. 218. The lead off single "Nevada Fighter" peaked at No. 70 on the Billboard charts and No. 67 in Canada.

When John London and John Ware left the First National Band in late November 1970, two tracks for the album were left unfinished: "Here I Am" (recorded in early January 1971) and "Rainmaker" (recorded over two dates in January). Nesmith recruited James Burton, Joe Osborn and Ron Tutt to help finish the album — all three had worked with Nesmith during his days with The Monkees.

The track, "Nevada Fighter" was originally recorded under the title "Apology." "Propinquity" was the third recording of this song by Nesmith — he demoed it for The Monkees in 1966 and recorded a 1968 version for the group.

== Track listing ==
All songs by Michael Nesmith except where noted.

1. "Grand Ennui" – 2:07
2. "Propinquity (I've Just Begun to Care)" – 2:59
3. "Here I Am" – 3:15
4. "Only Bound" – 3:23
5. "Nevada Fighter" – 3:06
6. "Texas Morning" (Mike Murphy, Boomer Castleman) – 3:00
7. "Tumbling Tumbleweeds" (Bob Nolan) – 4:10
8. "I Looked Away" (Eric Clapton, Bobby Whitlock) – 3:13
9. "Rainmaker" (Harry Nilsson, Bill Martin) – 3:17
10. "René" (Red Rhodes) – 1:40

== Charts ==
Chart (1971)	Position
United States (Billboard 200)	218
Australia (Kent Music Report)	45

== Personnel ==
The First National Band:

- Michael Nesmith – vocals, guitar
- John London – bass guitar
- John Ware – drums
- Red Rhodes – pedal steel guitar

Additional musicians:

- Joe Osborn – bass guitar
- Max Bennett – bass guitar
- Glen Hardin – keyboards
- Michael Cohen – keyboards
- Ron Tutt – drums
- James Burton – guitar
- Al Casey – guitar
