= Cruisin' (Michael Nesmith song) =

"Cruisin' (Lucy and Ramona and Sunset Sam)"

Song by Michael Nesmith

from the album Infinite Rider on the Big Dogma
- Released: 1979
- Recorded: 1979
- Genre: Rock
- Length: 3:49
- Label: Pacific Arts
- Songwriter: Michael Nesmith
- Producer: Michael Nesmith

"Cruisin'", also known as "Lucy and Ramona and Sunset Sam", is the last single to be released by Michael Nesmith as a solo artist. The song was released in 1979 under Pacific Arts (PAC 108) from the album Infinite Rider on the Big Dogma. The B-side of the single was "Carioca". "Cruisin'" tells the story of three individuals who live on the streets of Los Angeles, California and are related by their lifestyle.

== Background ==
A promotional video was made for Cruisin' and was released on Nesmith's Elephant Parts. Contrary to popular belief, the video did not debut Hulk Hogan, but rather, featured wrestler Steve Strong who resembles a young Hulk Hogan. Nesmith mistakenly stated in 1989 that Hogan played the role, but he corrected his statement in 2003.

The song received considerable airplay on AOR rock stations during the summer of 1979. Cleveland AOR station WMMS music director Denny Sanders had the song in "high rotation" during the months of July and August. Although it did not chart in the US, it peaked at No. 6 on the New Zealand singles chart.

The Original Spanish Kitchen appears briefly in the background of the video for the song. It is in a five-second vignette which accompanies the words, "passing up the treats from a Kid named Cisco", in the second verse of the song.

The record was released in Australia on 7 Records MS 413.

== Charts ==
Chart (1980)	Position
Australia (Kent Music Report)	94
New Zealand (RIANZ)	6

== Personnel ==
- Michael Nesmith – guitar, producer, vocals
- Lenny Castro – percussion
- Joe Chemay – arranger, background vocals
- John Hobbs – keyboards, background vocals
- Paul Leim – drums
- David MacKay – bass guitar
- Al Perkins – guitar
- Tom Saviano – saxophone
