= Red Rhodes =

American guitarist (1930–1995)

- Also known as: Red
- Born: Orville J. Rhodes; December 30, 1930; East Alton, Illinois
- Died: August 20, 1995 (aged 64) Los Angeles, California
- Genres: Country, country rock
- Instrument: Pedal steel guitar
- Years active: 1960s - 1990s
- Labels: Crown; Countryside; Exact; Happy Tiger; Alshire

Orville J. Rhodes, better known as Red Rhodes or O. J. Rhodes (December 30, 1930 – August 20, 1995), was an American pedal steel guitarist.

== Early life ==
Rhodes' mother taught him to play the Dobro resonator guitar when he was five years old. When he turned fifteen, he switched to the steel guitar. He was a boxer and an oil company engineer before he settled into music.

== Career ==
Rhodes moved to Los Angeles in 1960 and became a session musician.

Rhodes played pedal steel on many country rock, pop, and rock albums of artists such as The Monkees, Michael Nesmith, James Taylor, The Beach Boys, Seals and Crofts, The Byrds, The Carpenters, Spanky and Our Gang, and many others, as part of the Wrecking Crew studio musicians. He is remembered for his work with former Monkee Michael Nesmith on Nesmith's solo albums in the early 1970s. Rhodes is credited with the "other-worldly" effects created with pedal steel on The Ventures' "futuristic" LP The Ventures in Space, released in 1964.

In the late 1970s, Rhodes shifted his focus from performing to guitar electronics at his Royal Amplifier Service shop in Hollywood, California. There, Rhodes modified amplifiers and created his custom Velvet Hammer guitar pickups for James Burton, Clarence White, and other guitarists. His shop staff included future instrument makers David Schecter, Michael Tobias, and Bill Chapin.

Rheumatoid arthritis restricted Rhodes' public performances and recordings in the 1980s and 1990s, with the notable exception of his appearance on Michael Nesmith's Tropical Campfires album and tour in 1992. Rhodes fell ill soon after this tour, and died on August 20, 1995, from interstitial lung fibrosis.

== Discography ==
=== Solo projects ===
Year	Title	Label	Number	Notes
1966	Guitars Go Country	Crown	CLP-5483, CST-483	LP
1966	Once A Day	Crown	CLP-5520, CST-520	LP
1966	Blue, Blue Day And Other Steel Guitar Country and Western Favorites	Crown	CLP-5528, CST-528	LP
1966	Steel Guitar Rag And Other Country and Western Favorites	Crown	CLP-5555, CST-555	LP
1968	Steel Guitar Favorites	Somerset/Stereo Fidelity	SF-31300	LP
1969	Live at the Palomino	Happy Tiger	HT-1003-S	LP
1973	Velvet Hammer In A Cowboy Band	Countryside	CM-102, CM-0598	LP

=== Session work ===
- Skid Row Blues, Nothin', et al.', 1963, Hal Ford Forrest D Halford
- The Ventures in Space, 1964, The Ventures
- Begin, 1968, The Millennium
- Notorious Byrd Brothers, 1968, The Byrds
- The Wichita Train Whistle Sings, 1968, Michael Nesmith
- Bubblegum, Lemonade, and... Something for Mama, 1969, Cass Elliot
- Instant Replay, 1969, The Monkees
- It's Not Killing Me, 1969, Mike Bloomfield
- Hand Sown ... Home Grown, 1969, Linda Ronstadt
- Nancy, 1969, Nancy Sinatra
- Weeds, 1969, Brewer & Shipley
- The Blue Marble, 1969, Sagittarius
- Magnetic South, 1970, Michael Nesmith
- Loose Salute, 1970, Michael Nesmith
- John Phillips (John, the Wolf King of L.A.), 1970, John Phillips
- Sweet Baby James, 1970, James Taylor
- Tom Rush, 1970, Tom Rush
- Nevada Fighter, 1971, Michael Nesmith
- Possum, 1971, Possum
- Lead Free, 1972, B. W. Stevenson
- One Man Dog, 1972, James Taylor
- Hold On Dear Brother, 1972 The Beach Boys
- Rhymes and Reasons, 1972, Carole King
- Son of Schmilsson, 1972, Harry Nilsson
- A Song for You, 1972, The Carpenters
- Summer Breeze, 1972, Seals & Crofts
- Tantamount to Treason, 1972, Michael Nesmith
- And the Hits Just Keep on Comin', 1972, Michael Nesmith
- Willis Alan Ramsey, 1972, Willis Alan Ramsey
- Five & Dime, 1973, David Ackles
- Pure Country, 1973, Garland Frady
- Pretty Much Your Standard Ranch Stash, 1973, Michael Nesmith
- Valley Hi, 1973, Ian Matthews
- There's an Innocent Face, 1973, Curt Boettcher
- Calabasas, 1974, B. W. Stevenson
- L.A. Turnaround, 1974, Bert Jansch
- Black Bach, 1974, Lamont Dozier
- The Prison, 1974, Michael Nesmith
- Slow Dancer, 1974, Boz Scaggs
- Diamonds & Rust, 1975, Joan Baez
- Horizon, 1975, The Carpenters
- Midnight on the Water, 1975, David Bromberg
- Marriott, 1976, Steve Marriott
- Sweet America, 1976, Buffy Sainte-Marie
- Frolicking in the Myth, 1977, Steven Fromholz
- Road Songs, 1977, Hoyt Axton
- The Way I Am, 1981, Billy Preston
- Tropical Campfires, 1992, Michael Nesmith
