= Michael Nesmith =

American musician and actor (1942–2021)

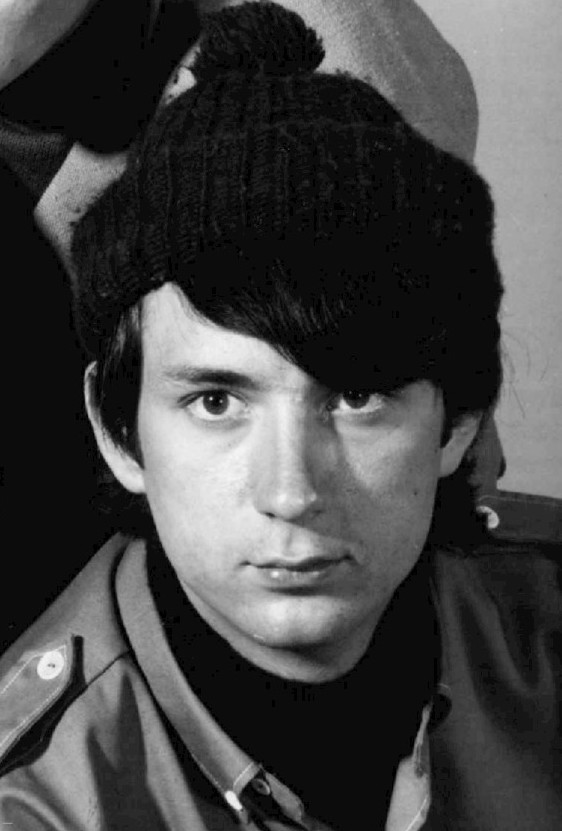
- Nesmith at a 1966 Monkees photoshoot

Background information
- Also known as: Michael Blessing; Nez; Wool Hat; Papa Nez
- Born: Robert Michael Nesmith; December 30, 1942; Houston, Texas, U.S.
- Died: December 10, 2021 (aged 78) Carmel Valley, California, U.S.
- Genres: Progressive country; rock; country rock; pop; folk; psychedelia
- Occupations: Musician; composer; author; songwriter; actor; writer; director; producer; owner of Pacific Arts Corporation
- Instruments: Guitar; vocals; keyboards; bass guitar
- Years active: 1965–2021
- Formerly of: The Monkees; The First National Band; The Second National Band
- Spouses: Phyllis Ann Barbour (m. 1964; div. 1972) Kathryn Bild (m. 1976; div. 1988) Victoria Kennedy (m. 2000; div. 2011)

Robert Michael Nesmith (December 30, 1942 – December 10, 2021) was an American musician, songwriter, author, screenwriter, and actor, known as a member of The Monkees and for his solo work. His songwriting credits with The Monkees include "Mary, Mary", "The Girl I Knew Somewhere", "Tapioca Tundra", "Circle Sky" and "Listen to the Band". Additionally, his song "Different Drum" became a hit for the Stone Poneys featuring Linda Ronstadt.

After leaving the Monkees in 1970, Nesmith continued his successful songwriting and performing career, first with the seminal country rock group the First National Band, with which he had a top-40 hit, "Joanne" (1970). As a solo artist, he scored an international hit with the song "Rio" (1977). He often played a custom-built Gretsch 12-string electric guitar both with the Monkees and afterward.

In 1974, Nesmith founded Pacific Arts, a multimedia production and distribution company, through which he helped pioneer the music video format, winning the first Grammy Award for Video of the Year for his hour-long comedy/variety program, Elephant Parts (1981). He created one of the first American television programs dedicated to music videos, PopClips, which aired on Nickelodeon in 1980, and was soon afterward approached to help develop the MTV network, though he declined. Nesmith was also an executive producer of the film Repo Man (1984).

== Early life ==
Nesmith was born in Houston on December 30, 1942. He was an only child; his parents, Warren Nesmith and Bette Nesmith (née McMurray), divorced when Nesmith was only four. Following the divorce, Bette raised Nesmith as a single mother. Bette McMurray took jobs involving clerical work to design work, eventually attaining the position of executive secretary at Texas Bank and Trust. She went on to invent the typewriter correction fluid known as Liquid Paper. Over the next 25 years, Bette Graham (she had remarried in 1962) built the Liquid Paper Corporation into an international company, which she sold to Gillette in 1979. She died in 1980 at the age of 56.

Nesmith attended Thomas Jefferson High School in Dallas, where he participated in choral and drama activities; he left high school without graduating and enlisted in the U.S. Air Force in 1960. He completed basic training at Lackland Air Force Base in San Antonio, was trained as an aircraft mechanic at Sheppard Air Force Base in Wichita Falls, Texas, and was permanently stationed at Clinton-Sherman Air Force Base near Burns Flat, Oklahoma. He obtained a General Educational Development certificate and was honorably discharged in 1962.

== Music career ==
After Nesmith's tour of duty in the Air Force, his mother and stepfather gave him a guitar for Christmas. Learning as he went, he played solo and in a series of working bands, performing folk, country, and occasionally rock and roll. He enrolled in San Antonio College, where he met John London and began a musical collaboration. They won the first San Antonio College talent award, performing a mixture of standard folk songs and a few of Nesmith's original songs. Nesmith began to write more songs and poetry, then moved to Los Angeles and began singing in folk clubs around the city. He served as the "Hootmaster" for the Monday night hootenanny at The Troubadour, a West Hollywood nightclub that featured new artists.

Randy Sparks from the New Christy Minstrels offered Nesmith a publishing deal for his songs. Nesmith began his recording career in 1963 by releasing a single on the Highness label. He followed this in 1965 with a one-off single released on Edan Records followed by two more recorded singles; one was titled "The New Recruit" under the name "Michael Blessing", released on Colpix Records—coincidentally this was also the label of Davy Jones, though the two men did not meet until the Monkees were formed.

Barry Freedman told him about upcoming auditions for a new TV series called The Monkees. In October 1965, Nesmith's confident, carefree and laid-back manner impressed the producers and he landed the role as the wool-hat-wearing guitar player "Mike" in the show, which required real-life musical talent for writing, instrument playing, singing, and performing in live concerts as part of the Monkees band.

Nesmith's "Mary, Mary" was recorded by the Paul Butterfield Blues Band, then by the Monkees themselves on their second LP in 1967, and subsequently reworked by rap group Run DMC in the mid-1980s. His "Different Drum" and "Some of Shelly's Blues" were later recorded by Linda Ronstadt and the Stone Poneys, in 1967 and 1968 respectively. "Pretty Little Princess", written in 1965, was recorded by Frankie Laine and released as a single in 1968 on ABC Records. Later, "Some of Shelly's Blues" and "Propinquity (I've Just Begun to Care)" were made popular by the Nitty Gritty Dirt Band on their 1970 album Uncle Charlie & His Dog Teddy.

=== The Monkees ===
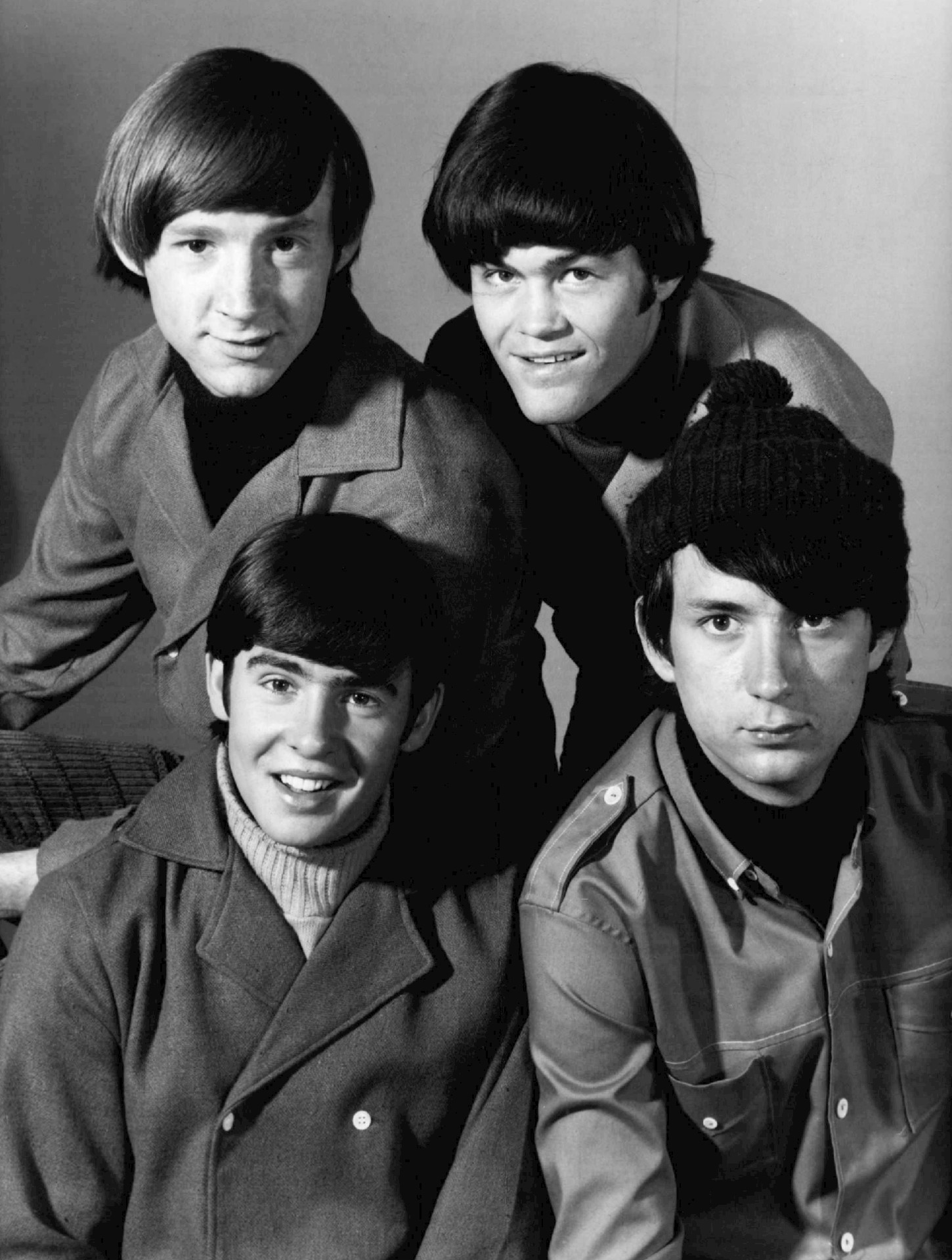
The Monkees in 1966 (Nesmith at bottom right)

From 1965 to early 1970, Nesmith, along with Micky Dolenz, Peter Tork, and Davy Jones, was a member of the television pop-rock band the Monkees, created for the television situation comedy of the same name. Nesmith won his role largely by appearing nonchalant when he auditioned. He rode his motorcycle to the audition, and wore a bobble hat to keep his hair out of his eyes; producers Bob Rafelson and Bert Schneider remembered the "wool hat guy" and called Nesmith back.

Once he was cast, Screen Gems bought his songs so they could be used in the show. Many of the songs Nesmith wrote for the Monkees, such as "The Girl I Knew Somewhere", "Mary, Mary", and "Listen to the Band" became minor hits. One song he wrote, "You Just May Be the One", is in mixed meter, interspersing 5/4 bars into an otherwise 4/4 structure.

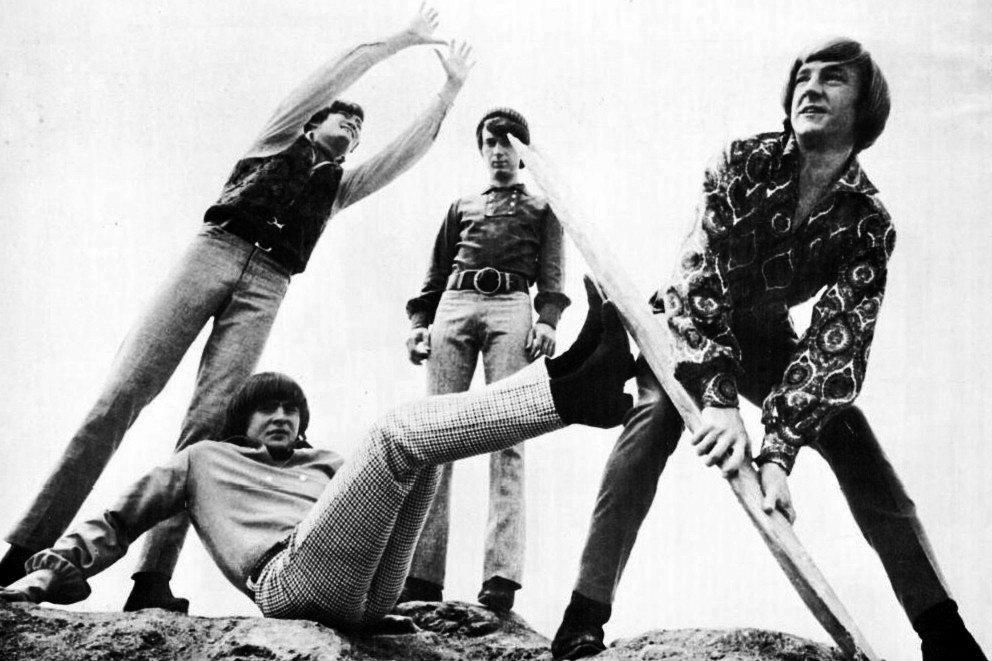
Nesmith (center) with the Monkees in 1967

Even before Colgems and Don Kirshner's surreptitious release of the second Monkees album, More of the Monkees, without the knowledge or consent of the four musician-actors, they came to be frustrated by their studio-manufactured "bubblegum" image. Within weeks of the album's release, Nesmith successfully lobbied the group's creators, Bob Rafelson and Bert Schneider, that the Monkees be allowed to play their instruments on future records. During a group meeting with musical supervisor Kirshner and Colgems lawyer Herb Moelis, in a suite at the Beverly Hills Hotel, each actor received a $250,000 royalties check; yet Nesmith still threatened to quit. Moelis rebuked him: "You'd better read your contract". Nesmith defiantly punched a hole in the wall, declaring to Moelis, "That could have been your face, motherfucker!" Weeks later, due to a breach of (verbal) agreement over the next single release, which was promised to Nesmith by Rafelson and Schneider, Nesmith led the charge in ousting Kirshner, effectively giving the four youths complete artistic and production control of their output. The group finally worked as a true four-man rock group on 1967's Headquarters—despite Jones and Dolenz having limited instrumental skills, studio time being expensive and retakes being costly.

During the band's first independent press conference, Nesmith called More of the Monkees "probably the worst record in the history of the world", partly due to rushed, shoddy studio engineering. The band took a hit to its artistic credibility when fans learned the four had not played all the instruments on the first two albums. However, sales continued to be profitable. Headquarters sold 2 million copies, down 2 million units from its predecessor, but still reached the No. 1 spot on Billboard, falling only to Sgt. Pepper's Lonely Hearts Club Band a week later and remaining at No. 2 all through the entire 1967 Summer of Love.

For the remaining five Monkees LPs, ironically, the original Kirshner formula of hired studio musicians and songwriters again became the norm, although Nesmith, Tork, Dolenz and Jones contributed about 50 percent of the original compositions, Nesmith the majority of those. By the end of the Monkees run, Nesmith was withholding many of his original song ideas from Monkees albums, planning to release them in his post-Monkees solo career.

Nesmith's last contractual Monkees commitment was a commercial for Kool-Aid and Nerf balls in April 1970 (fittingly, the spot ends with Nesmith frowning and saying, "Enerf's enerf!"). As the band's sales declined, Nesmith asked to be released from his contract, despite it costing him: "I had three years left ... at $150,000 [equivalent to $1.16 million in 2022] a year." He remained in a financial bind until 1980, when he received his inheritance from his mother's estate. In a 1980 interview with Playboy, he said of that time: "I had to start telling little tales to the tax man while they were putting tags on the furniture."

==== Return to the Monkees ====
Nesmith did not participate in the Monkees' 20th anniversary reunion, due to contractual obligations with his production company, but he did appear during an encore with the three other Monkees at the Greek Theatre on September 7, 1986. In a 1987 interview for Nick Rocks, Nesmith stated, "When Peter called up and said 'we're going to go out, do you want to go?' I was booked. But, if you get to L.A., I'll play." One of his sons auditioned for New Monkees but was not chosen.

Nesmith next joined his fellow Monkees for the 1986 "Monkees Christmas Medley" video for MTV appearing throughout dressed/disguised as Santa Claus until the finale, when he revealed his identity to all.

"The question I am most often asked is 'how does it feel to be up with the guys after all this time?' Well, it's a mixture of feelings and all of them are good. But the one that comes to mind is the feeling of profound gratitude."

— Michael Nesmith, speaking about being part of The Monkees at the Hollywood Walk of Fame Star award in 1989.

In 1989, Nesmith reunited with the other members of the Monkees: Micky Dolenz, Peter Tork, and Davy Jones. Prior to the official kickoff of The Monkees '89 tour (on July 1 in Winnipeg, Manitoba, Canada) all four Monkees gathered in Los Angeles, California, making two live radio appearances (KLOS-FM: The Mark and Brian Show on June 28 and KIIS Radio on June 30) to promote their reunion concert at the Universal Amphitheatre on July 9, 1989. The following day, all four band members were in attendance as the Monkees received a Hollywood Walk of Fame star.

In 1995, Nesmith again reunited with the Monkees to record their studio album (and first to feature all four since Head in 1968), titled Justus, released in 1996. He also wrote and directed a Monkees reunion television special, Hey, Hey, It's the Monkees. To support the reunion, Nesmith, Jones, Dolenz, and Tork briefly toured the UK in 1997. The UK tour was the last time all four Monkees performed as a group. In 2012–2014, after Jones's death, Nesmith reunited with Dolenz and Tork to perform concerts throughout the United States. Backed with a seven-piece band that included Nesmith's son, Christian, the trio performed 27 songs from The Monkees discography ("Daydream Believer" was sung by the audience). When asked why he had decided to return to the Monkees, Nesmith stated, "I never really left. It is a part of my youth that is always active in my thoughts and part of my overall work as an artist. It stays in a special place."

In 2016, Nesmith contributed to the Monkees' 50th anniversary album Good Times!. He additionally contributed a song, "I Know What I Know", and was reportedly "thrilled" at the outcome of the album. Despite not touring with Dolenz and Tork for the majority of the Monkees' 50th anniversary reunion in 2016, Nesmith did twice fill in for the ailing Peter Tork and appeared for the final show of the tour. It was the last time the three surviving Monkees performed as a group.

In 2018, Nesmith and Dolenz toured together as a duo for the first time under the banner "The Monkees Present: The Mike and Micky Show". The tour was cut short four dates out due to Nesmith having health issues. He was flown back home to undergo quadruple bypass surgery. He contributed two songs to the Monkees' 13th studio album, Christmas Party (the group's first Christmas album), released on October 12, 2018.

In 2019, Nesmith and Dolenz reunited again to make up the cancelled dates of the tour and adding several more dates, including a planned tour of Australia and New Zealand. Nesmith and Dolenz announced a follow-up tour, "An Evening with the Monkees", to begin in early 2020. The tour was delayed, however, due to the COVID-19 pandemic. It was announced by Nesmith and Dolenz on May 4, 2021, that the Monkees would disband following a farewell tour. Dubbed "The Monkees Farewell Tour", the tour consisted of over 40 dates in the United States from September to November. However, because of restrictions due to the ongoing COVID-19 pandemic, they were not able to play shows in Canada, the UK or Australia. The final date of the tour was held on November 14, 2021, at the Greek Theatre in Los Angeles.

== Solo career ==
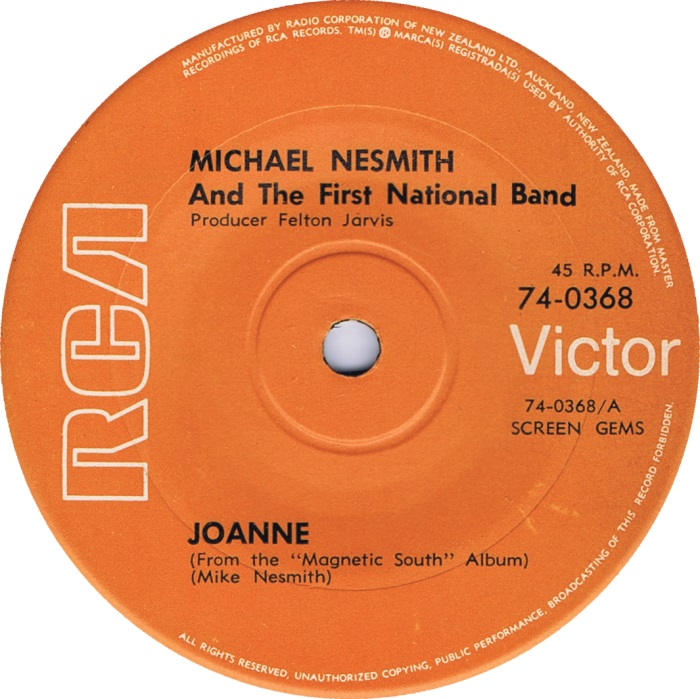
Side A of New Zealand "Joanne" single with the First National Band (1970)

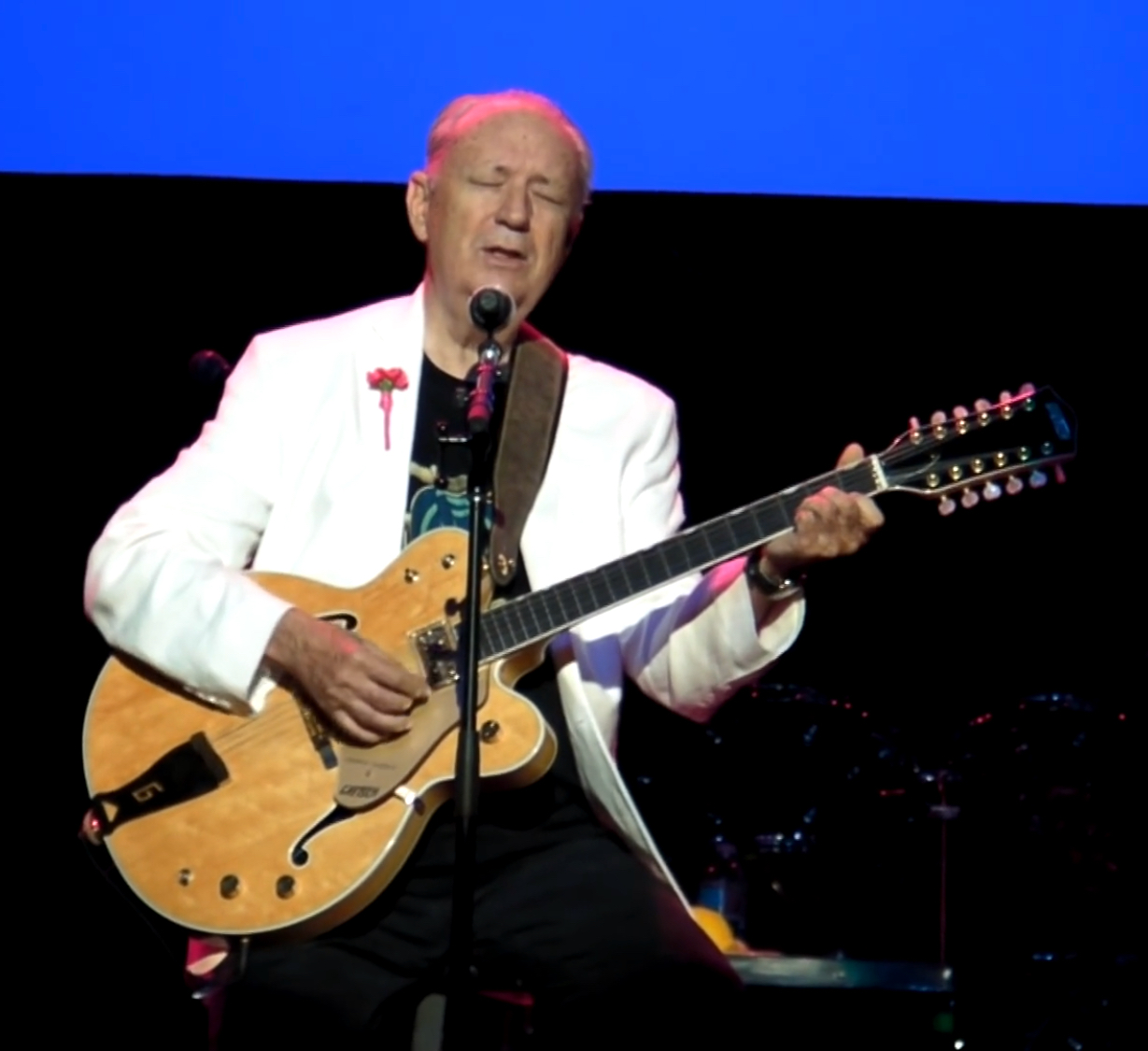
Nesmith plays his signature model Gretsch Model 6076, 2016

As he prepared for his exit from The Monkees, Nesmith was approached by John Ware of The Corvettes, a band that featured Nesmith's Texas band mate and close friend John London. London played on some of the earliest pre-Monkees, Nesmith 45s, as well as numerous Monkees sessions, and had 45s produced by Nesmith for the Dot label in 1969. Ware wanted Nesmith to put together a band. Nesmith's interest hinged on noted pedal steel player Orville "Red" Rhodes; their musical partnership continued until Rhodes's death in 1995. The new band was christened Michael Nesmith and the First National Band and recorded three albums for RCA Records, the first two issued in 1970 and the third released in 1971.

Nesmith's First National Band is now considered a pioneer of country-rock music. Nesmith wrote most of the songs for the band and he is considered one of the trailblazers of country rock. He also had moderate commercial success with the First National Band. Their second single, "Joanne", hit number 21 on the Billboard chart, number 17 on Cashbox, and number four in Canada, with the follow-up "Silver Moon" making number 42 Billboard, number 28 Cashbox, and number 13 in Canada. Two more singles charted ("Nevada Fighter" made number 70 Billboard, number 73 Cashbox, and number 67 Canada, and "Propinquity" reached number 95 Cashbox), and the first two LPs charted in the lower regions of the Billboard album chart. No clear answer has ever been given for the band's breakup.

Nesmith followed up with The Second National Band, which consisted of Nesmith (vocals and guitar), Michael Cohen (keyboards and Moog), Johnny Meeks (of The Strangers) (bass), jazzer Jack Ranelli (drums), and Orville Rhodes (pedal steel), as well as an appearance by singer, musician, and songwriter José Feliciano on congas. The album, Tantamount to Treason Vol. 1, was a commercial and critical disaster. Nesmith then recorded And the Hits Just Keep on Comin', featuring only him on guitar and Red Rhodes on pedal steel.

Nesmith then became more heavily involved in producing, working on Iain Matthews's album Valley Hi and Bert Jansch's L.A. Turnaround. Nesmith was given a label of his own, Countryside, through Elektra Records, as Elektra Records's Jac Holzman was a fan of Nesmith's. It featured a number of artists produced by Nesmith, including Garland Frady and Red Rhodes. The staff band at Countryside also helped Nesmith on his next, and last, RCA Victor album, Pretty Much Your Standard Ranch Stash.

In the mid-1970s, Nesmith briefly collaborated as a songwriter with Linda Hargrove, resulting in the tune "I've Never Loved Anyone More", a hit for Lynn Anderson and recorded by many others, as well as the songs "Winonah" and "If You Will Walk With Me", both of which were recorded by Hargrove. Of these songs, only "Winonah" was recorded by Nesmith himself. During this same period, Nesmith started his multimedia company Pacific Arts, which initially put out audio records, eight-track tapes, and cassettes, followed in 1981 with "video records". Nesmith recorded a number of LPs for his label, and had a moderate worldwide hit in 1977 with his song "Rio", the single taken from the album From a Radio Engine to the Photon Wing. In 1979, Nesmith released the single Cruisin', also known as "Lucy and Ramona and Sunset Sam", which was popular on AOR rock stations and in New Zealand. In 1983, Nesmith produced the music video for the Lionel Richie single "All Night Long". In 1987, he produced the music video for the Michael Jackson single "The Way You Make Me Feel".

=== PopClips and MTV, Elephant Parts, and Television Parts ===
During this time, Nesmith created a video clip for "Rio", which helped spur Nesmith's creation of a television program called PopClips for the Nickelodeon cable network. In 1980, PopClips was sold to the Time Warner/Amex consortium. Time Warner/Amex developed PopClips into the MTV network.

Nesmith won the first Grammy Award presented for (long-form) Music Video in 1982 for his hour-long Elephant Parts. He also had a short-lived series (1984-5) on NBC inspired by the video called Michael Nesmith in Television Parts. Television Parts included many other artists who were unknown at the time, but went on to become major stars in their own right: Jay Leno, Jerry Seinfeld, Garry Shandling, Whoopi Goldberg, and Arsenio Hall. The concept of the show was to have comics render their stand-up routines into short comedy films much like the ones in Elephant Parts. Nesmith assembled writers Jack Handey, William Martin, John Levenstein, and Michael Kaplan, along with directors William Dear (who had directed Elephant Parts) and Alan Myerson, as well as producer Ward Sylvester to create the show. The half-hour show ran for 5 episodes in the summer of 1985 on NBC Thursday nights in prime time.

=== Pacific Arts and legal dispute ===
Nesmith formed the Pacific Arts Corporation, Inc. in 1974 to manage and develop media projects. Pacific Arts Video became a pioneer in the home video market, producing and distributing a wide variety of videotaped programs, although the company eventually ceased operations after an acrimonious contract dispute with PBS over home video licensing rights and payments for several series, including Ken Burns' The Civil War. The dispute escalated into a lawsuit that went to jury trial in federal court in Los Angeles. On February 3, 1999, a jury awarded Nesmith and his company Pacific Arts $48.875 million in compensatory and punitive damages, prompting his widely quoted comment, "It's like finding your grandmother stealing your stereo. You're happy to get your stereo back, but it's sad to find out your grandmother is a thief." Six months after the verdict, a settlement was reached with the amount paid to Pacific Arts and Nesmith kept confidential.

Nesmith's most recent Pacific Arts project was Videoranch 3D, a virtual environment on the internet that hosted live performances at various virtual venues inside the ranch. He performed live inside Videoranch 3D on May 25, 2009.

=== Movies and books ===
Nesmith was the executive producer for the films Repo Man, Tapeheads, and Timerider: The Adventure of Lyle Swann, as well as his own solo recording and film projects.

In 1998, Nesmith published his first novel, The Long Sandy Hair of Neftoon Zamora. It was developed originally as an online project and was later published as a hardcover book by St Martin's Press. Nesmith's second novel, The America Gene, was released in July 2009 as an online download from Videoranch.com.

=== Recent history ===
In the early 1980s, Nesmith teamed with satirist P. J. O'Rourke to ride his vehicle Timerider in the annual Baja 1000 off-road race. This is chronicled in O'Rourke's 2009 book Driving Like Crazy.

During the 1990s, Nesmith, as trustee and president of the Gihon Foundation, hosted the Council on Ideas, a gathering of intellectuals from different fields who were asked to identify the most important issues of their day and publish the result. The foundation ceased the program in 2000 and started a new program for the performing arts. Nesmith also spent a decade as a board of trustees member, nominating member and vice-chair of the American Film Institute.

In 1992, Nesmith undertook a concert tour of North America to promote the first CD release of his RCA solo albums (although he included the song "Rio" from the album From a Radio Engine to the Photon Wing). The concert tour ended at the Britt Festival in Oregon. A video and CD, both entitled Live at the Britt Festival, were released capturing the 1992 concert.

Nesmith continued to record and release his own music. His final album, Rays, was released in 2006. In 2011, he returned to producing, working with blues singer and guitarist Carolyn Wonderland. Nesmith produced Wonderland's version of Robert Johnson's "I Believe I'll Dust My Broom" on her album Peace Meal. Wonderland married writer-comedian A. Whitney Brown on March 4, 2011, in a ceremony officiated by Nesmith.

In 2012, Nesmith briefly toured Europe prior to rejoining the Monkees for their tours of the United States. Intermixing the Monkees concerts, Nesmith also launched solo tours of the U.S. Unlike his 1992 U.S. tour, which predominantly featured music from his RCA recordings, Nesmith stated that his 2013 tour would feature songs he considers "thematic, chronological and most often requested by fans". Chris Scruggs, grandson of Earl Scruggs, replaced the late Red Rhodes on the steel guitar. The tour was captured on a live album, Movies Of The Mind.

In 2014, he guest-starred in season four, episode nine, of the IFC comedy series Portlandia in the fictitious role of the father of the mayor of Portland, Oregon.

In 2017, Nesmith released a memoir and companion "soundtrack" album titled Infinite Tuesday: An Autobiographical Riff.

In 2018, he announced that he would be doing a five-date tour of California with a revamped version of The First National Band, including a date at The Troubadour, where he performed before The Monkees. On February 20, a tour was announced as "The Monkees Present: The Mike and Micky Show", their first tour as a duo. The pair would play Monkees music and promote the tour under the Monkees banner, but Nesmith stated, "there's no pretense there about Micky and I [sic] being the Monkees. We're not." The tour was cut short in June 2018, with four shows remaining on the tour schedule due to Nesmith having a health issue. Dolenz and Nesmith rescheduled the unplayed concerts plus adding several other including an Australian and New Zealand tour in 2019. After recovering from his health scare, Michael Nesmith and the First National Band Redux went on a tour of the U.S., with mostly the same lineup and setlist as the southern California shows.

In 2019, Nesmith toured in a two-piece configuration with pedal steel player Pete Finney, focusing on his 1972 album, And the Hits Just Keep on Comin'. This was the first time Nesmith had performed in this format since 1974 with Red Rhodes. Nesmith was also joined by special guests Ben Gibbard and Scott McCaughey on opening night in Seattle.

== Personal life ==
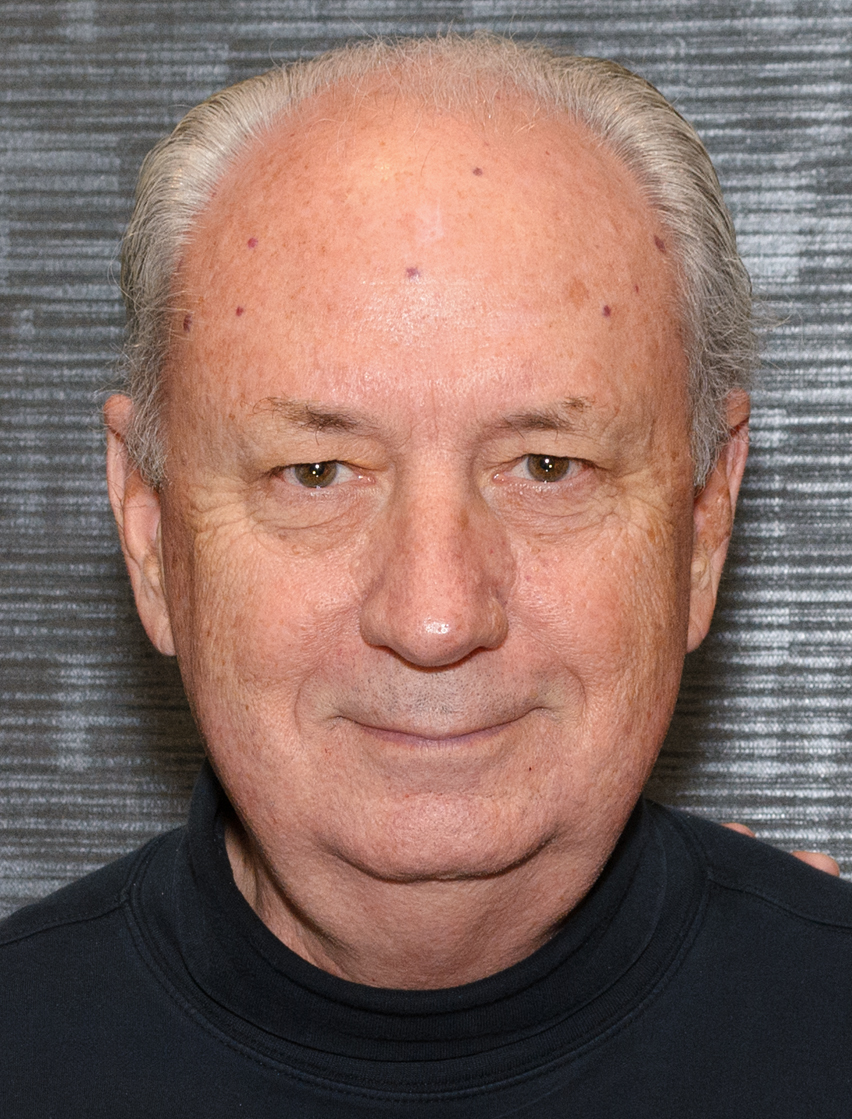
Nesmith at the Chiller Theatre Expo 2017

Nesmith was married three times and had four children.

He met his first wife, Phyllis Ann Barbour, in 1964, while at San Antonio College. They had three children together: Christian, born in 1965; Jonathan, born in 1968; and Jessica, born in 1970. Nesmith and Barbour divorced in 1972.

Nesmith also had a son, Jason, born in August 1968 to Nurit Wilde, whom he met while working on The Monkees.

From 1976 to 1988, he was married to his second wife, Kathryn Bild, a screenwriter and television producer.

In 2000, he married his third wife, Victoria Kennedy. The marriage ended in divorce in 2011.

Nesmith practiced Christian Science, a belief passed on from his mother Bette.

When the Monkees' TV series ended in 1968, Nesmith enrolled part-time at the University of California, Los Angeles, where he studied American history and music history. In 1973, Nesmith founded the Countryside Records label with Jac Holzman, the founder of Elektra Records. In 1974, Nesmith started Pacific Arts Corporation and released what he called "a book with a soundtrack", titled The Prison, as the company's first release.

=== Health and death ===
Nesmith was forced to cancel the last four dates of his 2018 tour with Micky Dolenz due to a "minor health scare". In an interview with Rolling Stone published on July 26 of that year, Nesmith said he had undergone quadruple bypass heart surgery, and had been hospitalized for over a month.

Nesmith died from heart failure at his home in Carmel Valley, California on December 10, 2021, at the age of 78, less than a month after his final performance. His family said in a statement: “With infinite love we announce that Michael Nesmith has passed away this morning in his home, surrounded by family, peacefully and of natural causes.” Dolenz memorialized Nesmith as "a dear friend and partner."

== Discography ==
- The Wichita Train Whistle Sings (1968)
- Magnetic South (1970)
- Loose Salute (1970)
- Nevada Fighter (1971)
- Tantamount to Treason Vol. 1 (1972)
- And the Hits Just Keep on Comin' (1972)
- Pretty Much Your Standard Ranch Stash (1973)
- The Prison: A Book with a Soundtrack (1974) (soundtrack)
- From a Radio Engine to the Photon Wing (1977)
- Live at the Palais (1978)
- Infinite Rider on the Big Dogma (1979)
- Tropical Campfires (1992)
- The Garden (1994) (soundtrack)
- Timerider: The Adventure of Lyle Swann (2000) (soundtrack, recorded 1980)
- Rays (2005)
- The Ocean (2015)

== Filmography ==
=== Television ===
Year	Title	Role	Notes
1966–1968	The Monkees	Himself	Credited as Monkees persona "Mike"
1969	33 1/3 Revolutions per Monkee	Host	NBC special
1985	Television Parts	Host	One-series spin-off from Elephant Parts
1997	Hey, Hey, It's the Monkees	Himself	Credited as Monkees persona "Mike"
2014	Portlandia	Father of the Mayor	Season 4, episode 9

=== Films ===
Year	Title	Role	Notes
1968	Head	Himself	Credited as Monkees persona "Mike"
1982	Timerider: The Adventure of Lyle Swann	Race Official	uncredited
1984	Repo Man	Rabbi	credited
1987	Burglar	Cabbie	uncredited
1988	Tapeheads	Water Man	uncredited

=== Home video ===
Year	Title	Role	Notes
1981	Elephant Parts	Various characters/Producer	Released on DVD 1998 and again in 2003
1981	An Evening with Sir William Martin	Foyer the butler/Writer/Producer	Half-hour comedic monologue
1983	Rio and Cruisin'	Performer/Producer	Music videos
1985	The Television Parts Home Companion	Various characters/Producer	Compilation from television series
1986	Dr. Duck's Super-Secret All-Purpose Sauce	Various characters/Producer	Music and comedy segments
1989	Nezmusic	Performer/Producer	Music videos
1991	Live at the Britt Festival	Performer/Producer	Concert from 1991 concert
2008	Pacific Arts	Performer/Producer	Music videos on DVD

== Books ==
(n.b. books proper – not including The Prison and The Garden)

- The Long Sandy Hair of Neftoon Zamora (1998)
- The America Gene (2009)
- Infinite Tuesday: An Autobiographical Riff (2017)

=== Audiobooks ===
- The Long Sandy Hair of Neftoon Zamora (2004) (with Nesmith reading the story)
- Infinite Tuesday: An Autobiographical Riff (2017) (narrated by Nesmith)
