= Pacific Arts Corporation =

American media company

- Pacific Arts Corporation logo c. 1981
- Type: Private
- Industry: Media and content
- Founded: 1974
- Defunct: December 10, 2021
- Headquarters: Monterey, California, U.S.
- Key people: Michael Nesmith, owner; Howard Leitner, accountant; Victoria Kennedy, corporate secretary
- Products: Distribution and management of media properties; managing partner of Videoranch LLC; 3D online Environments; Live content into virtual environments
- Owner: Michael Nesmith
- Subsidiaries: The Pacific Arts Corporation, Inc., Pacific Arts, Pacific Arts Audio, Pacific Arts Entertainment, Pacific Arts Video, Rio Records, Zoomo Productions, Inc.
- Website: videoranch.com

The Pacific Arts Corporation, Inc. was a company formed by Michael Nesmith circa 1974 to manage and develop media projects. It went dormant and quietly shut down in 2021 following Nesmith's death.

== History ==
Pacific Arts Corporation, Inc. began as Pacific Arts Productions, Inc. when incorporated on October 18, 1974, as a California corporation by Michael Nesmith (incorporated by Nesmith's accountant, Howard Leitner of Leitner, Zander, Sniderman & Co., Los Angeles). The first product released under Pacific Arts Productions was under the subsidy of the Pacific Arts Records label in September 1974 of Nesmith's own concept album, The Prison.

Between 1974 and 1981, Pacific Arts Productions created a large library of various musical artists and built its own independent record distribution system. Nesmith considered Pacific Arts an umbrella corporation over two major divisions: TV and records. It was during this time that Nesmith began to develop music videos, produce PopClips (the predecessor for MTV), and ideas for a non-theatrical home video business.

In 1981, Pacific Arts Productions, Inc. changed its name to The Pacific Arts Corporation, Inc. (PAC) PAC was then structured to oversee various anticipated subsidiaries for managing different types of media which included Pacific Arts Records. There have been several Pacific Arts subsidiaries over the years, including, but not limited to, Pacific Arts Productions, Inc., Pacific Arts Pictures (merged out), Pacific Arts Publishing (merged out), and Pacific Arts Audio Inc. (dissolved).

Following the creation of PAC in 1981, Pacific Arts Video (a subsidiary of PAC) released the home video Elephant Parts, a long-form video featuring various comedy skits and music videos. Elephant Parts was an early home video available to consumers and would win the first Grammy Award for a music video. Koyaanisqatsi (1983) was among the titles they distributed.

In 1992, Pacific Arts began releasing promotional material on the then-upcoming video, Michael Nesmith Live at the Britt Festival. With the release, Nesmith alludes to the growing number of subsidiaries, listing the distribution of the video as a Pacific Arts subsidiary named "One of the Nesmith Enterprises". On the release of Nesmith's album The Garden in 1994, he introduced his current record company, Rio Records. PAC is the managing partner of Videoranch, LLC which was established in 2007 as a Delaware LLC. Videoranch LLC is the operating entity for Videoranch.com and Videoranch3d.com.

Following Nesmith's death on December 10, 2021, the company quietly ceased all operations. Videoranch3D's site is currently inactive.

== Movie production ==
Following the success of Elephant Parts, Pacific Arts focused its attention on producing full-length motion pictures. Its first major motion picture was the Timerider: The Adventure of Lyle Swann (1982). Its film Repo Man was released in 1984, for Michael Nesmith served as executive producer under its still-active subsidy, Zoomo Productions, Inc.

The last major motion picture Pacific Arts produced was Tapeheads (1988). Following its release, Pacific Arts turned its attention to home video and later, at the turn of the century, the internet.

== Video distribution ==
Throughout the 1980s, Pacific Arts acquired what was at the time the world's largest catalog of non-theatrical video titles, and set up its own independent distribution system. By 1987, former Pacific Arts Video Distribution (a.k.a. Pacific Arts Video Classics) president Robert Fread had quit, who had been at the video arm since the early 1980s, and he would be replaced as president by George Steele, who had been at the home video arm since 1984, and when owner Michael Nesmith was soliciting bids for a sale portion of the Pacific Arts video arm, which involved lawyers were Paramount Home Video and Nelson Entertainment.

=== PAC/PBS lawsuit ===
In 1990, Pacific Arts secured a contract with PBS to distribute the PBS video catalog under the PBS Home Video banner. However, in the early 1990s, Pacific Arts and PBS went through a series of serious disagreements. Lawsuits were filed: by Nesmith and Pacific Arts against PBS for breach of contract, intentional misrepresentation (fraud), intentional concealment (fraud), negligent misrepresentation, and interference with contract; and by PBS against Nesmith and Pacific Arts for lost royalties. The lawsuits escalated in 1994 and 1995 into major litigation between the parties over these rights and payments. PBS and Nesmith and Pacific Arts vigorously prosecuted these multimillion-dollar counter-suits.

The six plaintiffs included PBS, including WGBH in signings, WNET in signings, American Documentaries and Radio Pioneers Film Project (production companies owned by producer Ken Burns), and the Children's Television Workshop. They sought approximately $5 million in disputed royalties, advances, guarantees, and license fees for programs and the use of the PBS logo from the defendants Pacific Arts and Nesmith.

Due to the cost of the litigation, Pacific Arts was forced to cease distribution operations, and suspended the use of the PBS logo on the Pacific Arts videos. Though Pacific Arts distribution system had ceased operating, the various plaintiffs were counting on capturing a personal financial guarantee Nesmith had made to PBS in the original PBS deal in 1990.

The cases went to jury trial in Federal Court in Los Angeles in February 1999.

By the end of the trial, the judge and jury were leaning toward Nesmith's (Pacific Arts) counterclaims. Henry Gradstein, lead attorney for Nesmith, contended in a brief that the company's video rights were worth enough for it to have paid off any proper debts to the producers. But, he said, PBS had concocted a "dastardly scheme, which was played out with military precision, to strip Pacific Arts of its assets by inducing Pacific Arts not to file bankruptcy, by lulling it into a sense of security while it organized a mass termination of Pacific Arts' licenses."

After three days of deliberation, the nine-person jury unanimously agreed with Gradstein and found PBS liable for breach of contract, intentional misrepresentation (fraud), intentional concealment (fraud), negligent misrepresentation, and interference with contract. The court awarded Pacific Arts $14,625,000 for loss of its rights library, plus $29,250,000 in punitive damages. The jury awarded $3 million to Nesmith personally, including $2 million in punitive damages for a total award to Nesmith and Pacific Arts of $48,875,000. The jury resolved the outstanding license fee issues by ordering Pacific Arts and Nesmith to pay approximately $1.2 million to American Documentaries for The Civil War, about $230,000 to WGBH, and $150,000 to WNET.

Following the ruling, Nesmith expressed his personal disappointment with PBS and was quoted by BBC News as stating "It's like finding your grandmother stealing your stereo. You're happy to get your stereo back, but it's sad to find out your grandmother is a thief."

After the judgment against PBS, Nesmith told Entertainment Weekly, "I may not get back in business at all. If you can't trust PBS, who can you trust?"

Six months after the verdict, a settlement was reached with the amount paid to Pacific Arts and Nesmith kept confidential.

== Videoranch and Videoranch3D ==
In 1995, Pacific Arts opened Videoranch, which hosted several multimedia projects, including video and audio clips from various albums and video productions it owned or licensed. In 1998, Videoranch began the second-phase of multimedia via the internet by launching Videoranch 3D (VR3D), a 3-D virtual world as a test bed for technologies which could deliver live content into virtual environments. VR3D is a virtual world that is the most active of the Pacific Arts enterprises.

In 2004, Nesmith developed a process for seamlessly embedding live video in virtual worlds and a companion production technique that allowed live performers to interact in real time with a virtual audience. Nesmith has two patents pending for these processes which were filed in 2007.

Videoranch3D began a series of trial productions in 2006 which consisted mostly of live music concerts. In addition, there have been and are ongoing seminars, book signings, and professional musician clinics.

Pacific Arts produced over 100+ live performances under the Videoranch3D label during its operation, including shows with Nesmith performing, prior to its eventual dormancy and ultimate closure.

== Publishing ==
To continue developing the multimedia platform, Pacific Arts published the audiobook of Nesmith's first novel, The Long Sandy Hair of Neftoon Zamora. The book was published and distributed by St. Martin's Press. The unabridged reading of the novel was released on a six-CD set by Pacific Arts and was sublicensed for direct download to Audible.com.

In June 2009, Pacific Arts began a serialized release of Nesmith's second novel, The America Gene. A free sample and the first chapter were released for preview and a purchased download, respectively. Plans call for the release of one chapter of the book online per week for sixteen weeks. After its release, Nesmith holds a "live reading" of each chapter of the book in the Videoranch3D virtual world.

In June 2009, Videoranch began selling a serialized version of Nesmith's novel, The America Gene, beginning one chapter at a time. The 16-chapter novel has been released in its entirety and is available for purchase at the Videoranch online store. Unlike the Pacific Arts release of Nesmith's first book, The Long Sandy Hair of Neftoon Zamora, which was released as a printed novel, The America Gene is only available electronically.

== Recent history ==
Re-releases of the Michael Nesmith Pacific Arts' catalog (both music and videos) for UK and Europe were licensed to Demon Music Group.

In January 2007, Pacific Arts built a special production stage in Sand City, California for producing live performances and delivering them into virtual worlds. The live performances are delivered over the internet and seamlessly embedded into a fully multiplexed 3D environment. The first of these environments is Videoranch3D.

In February 2009, Videoranch released a 6-minute song entitled "Helen's Eternal Birthday". The single track was released exclusively through Videoranch as a test of its download sales. Following the test, the Videoranch download sales site was made operational with most of the Videoranch software catalog available for purchase and download delivery. In 2010, a first revision to "Helen’s Eternal Birthday" resulted in it being re-titled as "January." Nesmith had suggested that he would continue to release songs on the Videoranch website in various states of completion while updating those songs as he feels compelled, thus making the listener a part of each musical journey. This sense of audience inclusion in an entertainment enterprise was a recurring theme in this phase of Nesmith's career, the roots of which may be found in Nesmith's first Pacific Arts album “The Prison”, released in 1974. The audience reads a companion book while listening to this album to provide a unique aural experience for each audience member.

Michael Nesmith died on December 10, 2021, therefore making the company dormant. In April 2026, all of the company's unsold merchandise was given to a local consignment and thrift store.
