= Joanne (Michael Nesmith song) =

1970 single by Michael Nesmith and the First National Band

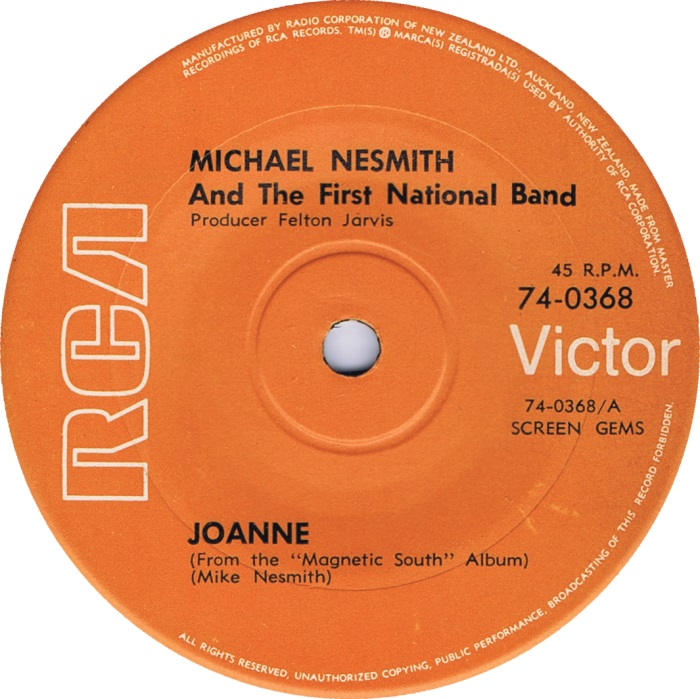
- Side A of the 1970 New Zealand single

Single by Michael Nesmith and the First National Band

from the album Magnetic South
- Released: July 1970
- Recorded: February 20, 1970
- Genre: Country rock
- Length: 3:10
- Label: RCA Victor
- Songwriter: Michael Nesmith
- Producer: Felton Jarvis

Michael Nesmith and the First National Band singles chronology
"Little Red Rider" (1970)	"Joanne" (1970)	"Silver Moon" (1970)

Audio
- "Joanne" on YouTube

"Joanne" is a song written and performed by the American musician and actor Michael Nesmith, his only Top 40 hit song as a solo artist. The single was issued by RCA Records in mid 1970, from the album Magnetic South, the first album released by Nesmith and The First National Band after he left The Monkees. In the United States, the song peaked at No. 21 on the Billboard Top 100 on October 3, 1970. It went to No. 4 in Canada, No. 3 in Australia, and No. 1 in New Zealand. In the U.S., it was the most successful solo chart hit for any member of The Monkees.

"Joanne" was the second single issued from Magnetic South, following the release of "Little Red Rider" (which did not chart). On the B-side of "Joanne", the track "One Rose" appears. RCA later reissued "Joanne" backed with "Silver Moon", as a single in its 45 rpm "Gold Standard Series". "Silver Moon" was originally issued as a single from Nesmith's next album Loose Salute, released in November 1970.

"Joanne" was a staple on all of Nesmith's solo concert tours and has appeared on all four of his live albums: Live At The Palais, Live at the Britt Festival, Movies of the Mind, and Live At The Troubador. Nesmith would also spoof "Joanne" on his 1981 home video, Elephant Parts, with the song "Rodan".

== Personnel ==
- Michael Nesmith – vocals, rhythm guitar
- O.J. "Red" Rhodes – pedal steel guitar
- John Ware – drums
- John London – bass
- Earl P. Ball – piano

== Chart history ==
=== Weekly charts ===
Chart (1970–1971)	Peak position
Australia (KMR)	3
Canada Top Singles (RPM)	4
New Zealand (Listener)	1
US Billboard Hot 100	21
US Billboard Adult Contemporary	6
US Cash Box Top 100	17
US Record World	13

=== Year-end charts ===
Chart (1970)	Rank
Australia	35
Canada	63
