= The First National Band =

American country rock band led by Michael Nesmith

- Genres: Country rock, progressive country
- Years active: 1970–1972, 2018
- Label: RCA
- Past members: Michael Nesmith, guitar & vocals O.J. "Red" Rhodes, pedal steel guitar John London, bass guitar John Ware, drums
- Website: videoranch.com

The First National Band or Michael Nesmith and The First National Band was an American collaborative band, led by Michael Nesmith after his departure from The Monkees. During the two active years, The First National Band released three albums from 1970 to 1971.

== History ==
=== Prelude ===
Early in his career, Nesmith released a handful of singles under the name "Michael Blessing" which were folk rock strongly inspired by the work of Bob Dylan.

As a member of The Monkees, Nesmith was unhappy with the bubblegum pop records that musical director Don Kirshner was providing for the group, and fought to get his own compositions to be recorded under the Monkees name.

In 1968, Nesmith released The Wichita Train Whistle Sings as a side-project from the Monkees. In 1970, he bought himself out of his Monkees contract altogether.

=== Forming the band ===
In 1969, when it was clear to Nesmith and his friend John Ware that The Monkees were soon coming to an end, Ware suggested that they form another band with their mutual friend John London and put his studio connections to good use while he still had the chance.

Nesmith took Ware up on his offer—on the condition that Orville "Red" Rhodes would join and that the band would not "just do that power trio thing". The First National Band was the start of a collaboration between Nesmith and Rhodes that lasted until Rhodes's death in 1995.

=== Career ===
The First National Band endured many problems in its short career. Nesmith's association with the Monkees had made him a joke to some people and as a result many fellow musicians would not take his music seriously. During one of the band's first gigs, they played alongside Gram Parsons and his new band The Flying Burrito Brothers. Nesmith recalls how others seeing a former Monkee decked out in a Nudie suit with a steel player in tow must have been laughable to seasoned Country devotees, such as Parsons. However, their unique sound won over the LA club scene and created a new image for Nesmith. Nesmith also asked venues not to promote or refer to his time in the Monkees when advertising or introducing the band. Many emcees ignored such requests, drawing his ire. Audience members would shout out requests for "Last Train to Clarksville" and other Monkees hits.

During his stint with The Monkees, Nesmith had accumulated an extensive back-catalogue of unreleased songs. This enabled The First National Band to release three albums in fewer than 12 months. July 1970 saw the release of Magnetic South, which was the first and "blue" in the trilogy of "red, white and blue" albums and reached No. 143 on the Billboard Albums Chart. This album contained five songs from Nesmith's Monkees days. It also contained the song "Joanne", which, due to a lot of radio play, surprised the band by reaching No. 21 on the Billboard Singles Chart. However, despite this chart success, the single did not gain the band commercial success because the band were in Britain, on a tour of working-man's clubs, which lasted until "Joanne" had dropped out of the American charts and sunk without a trace. Ware claimed that the band's management believed that, as the Monkees weren't as well known in Britain, it would be the perfect place to try to break in this new change in musical direction.

November 1970 saw the release of the band's second "red" album, Loose Salute, which reached No. 159 on the Billboard Album chart. This contained the minor hit "Silver Moon" (Billboard #42) and a re-working of the Monkees song, "Listen to the Band".

After the band had returned from Britain, and after "Joanne”’s success had long since been forgotten, work was started on the band's final "white" album, Nevada Fighter. Recording for this album started in October 1970, but things within the group started falling apart, which led to both Ware and London leaving the group the following month. Released in May 1971, it failed to chart.

=== Post-breakup ===
Nesmith and Rhodes continued to work together, and recruited musicians from Elvis Presley's band to work on Nesmith's fifth album, Tantamount to Treason Vol. 1. This was released in May 1972 and credited to "Michael Nesmith & The Second National Band".

Nesmith and Rhodes collaborated on Nesmith's later solo albums until Rhodes's death in 1995. Nesmith continued to release solo albums until Rays in 2006.

During Nesmith's 2013 tour of the U.S., an isolated backing track of Rhodes playing the pedal steel from the song "Thanx for the Ride" from Loose Salute was played while Nesmith and his band accompanied the track.

=== First National Band Redux (2018) ===
Nesmith announced The first National Band would returning with five concerts in early 2018 in southern and northern California under the banner "The First National Band Redux". This incarnation of the First National Band is largely in name only, since other than Nesmith, all of the other members were either dead or retired; Nesmith's sons, Christian and Jonathan, were among the members of the new First National Band lineup. The second First National Band includes, in addition to the Nesmiths, Jason Chesney on bass, Pete Finney on steel guitar, and Christopher Allis on drums, along with backing vocalists Amy Spear and Circe Link. To coincide with the tour, the band's three studio albums were re-released on colored vinyl in late March, from oldies label Sundazed. Christian and Jonathan also contributed to The Monkees' Christmas album Christmas Party. The band continued to tour throughout 2018 and released a live album from their show at the Troubadour.
