= Silver Moon (Michael Nesmith song) =

Single by Michael Nesmith

from the album Loose Salute
- Released: 1970
- Recorded: 1970
- Genre: Country rock
- Length: 3:15
- Label: RCA Victor
- Songwriter: Michael Nesmith
- Producer: Michael Nesmith

Michael Nesmith singles chronology
"Joanne" (1970)	"Silver Moon" (1970)	"Nevada Fighter" (1971)

Silver Moon was the third single Michael Nesmith recorded as a solo artist and the second to reach the Billboard Hot 100, released in 1970 from his second solo album, Loose Salute.

Nesmith recorded the song with The First National Band. It reached number 42 on the Top 100 and number 7 on the Adult Contemporary charts in the US, number 13 in Canada, number 11 in Australia and number 7 in the Netherlands. The track includes a pedal steel guitar solo played by O.J. "Red" Rhodes.

== Background ==
Although Nesmith released several singles following "Silver Moon", "Silver Moon" was his last song to reach a notable status on the charts. On the B-side of "Silver Moon", the track "Lady of the Valley" appears. The now highly collectable quadraphonic 8-track tape release of Loose Salute (1970) features an extended version of "Silver Moon". It is a full-length rendition of the song with a cold ending.

Similar to Nesmith's earlier single, "Joanne", Nesmith included "Silver Moon" on his regular set of solo concert tours, and the song appears on all three of his live albums: Live At The Palais, Live at the Britt Festival and Movies of the Mind.

== Charts ==
Chart (1971)	Position
Australia (Kent Music Report)	11
New Zealand (Listener)	3
US Billboard Easy Listening	7
US Billboard Hot 100	42

== Personnel ==
- Michael Nesmith – vocals and rhythm guitar
- John London – bass
- John Ware – drums
- O.J. "Red" Rhodes – pedal steel guitar
- Glen D. Hardin – piano
