= Live at the Palais =

Live album by Michael Nesmith
- Released: August 1978
- Recorded: November 10, 1977
- Venue: Palais Theatre, Melbourne
- Genre: Country rock
- Length: 51:03
- Label: Pacific Arts
- Producer: Michael Nesmith

Michael Nesmith chronology
From a Radio Engine to the Photon Wing (1977)	Live at the Palais (1978)	Infinite Rider on the Big Dogma (1979)

Professional ratings
Review scores
Source	Rating
Allmusic	link

Live at the Palais is a live album by American singer-songwriter Michael Nesmith, originally released in 1978. It was recorded in 1977 at the Palais Theatre in Melbourne.

Most of the songs on the album were derived from the half-dozen albums Nesmith recorded for RCA Records in the early 1970s. The album reunited Nesmith with drummer John Ware, whom he had worked with on his first three albums Magnetic South, Loose Salute, and Nevada Fighter, and also marked one of his first collaborations with guitarist John Jorgenson and keyboardist John Hobbs; both would play in the group the Hellecasters with help from Nesmith.

Although the album received good reviews, it was a commercial disappointment. Nesmith lampoons the album on his Grammy Award winning 1981 music/comedy video, Elephant Parts.

== CD release ==
In the 1990s, when his Pacific Arts back catalog was being reissued on CD, Nesmith withheld Live at the Palais from re-release citing dissatisfaction with his performance. However, due to demand from his fans worldwide, Nesmith reissued the album in 2001 and included nearly a half-hour of bonus material drawn from other live performances.

== Track listing ==
All songs by Michael Nesmith unless otherwise noted.

1. "Grand Ennui" – 7:24
2. "Calico Girlfriend" – 4:59
3. "Propinquity" – 6:12
4. "Joanne" – 7:09
5. "Roll With the Flow" – 6:18
6. "Some of Shelly's Blues" – 5:40
7. "Silver Moon" – 8:14
8. "Nadine (Is It You?)" (Chuck Berry) – 6:43
  2004 reissue bonus tracks:
9. "Grand Ennui" – 5:02
10. "Capsule" – 6:46
11. "Crippled Lion" – 4:16
12. "Listen to the Band" – 4:41

== Personnel ==
- Michael Nesmith – vocals, guitar
- Al Perkins – lead, slide and pedal steel guitars
- John Ware – drums
- Joe Chemay – bass
- John Davis – bass
- Steve Duncan – drums
- John Hobbs – keyboards
- John Jorgenson – guitar
- Paul Leim – drums
- David MacKay – bass
- Jerry Swallow – guitar
- James Trumbo – keyboards
- Billy Joe Walker, Jr. – guitar
