= Mile of Music =

American music festival

- Genre: Americana, Roots, Folk, Indie, Indie rock, Singer/Songwriter
- Locations: Appleton, Wisconsin, U.S.
- Years active: 2013–present
- Founders: Dave Willems (marketing executive and community advocate); Willems Marketing staff
- Attendance: 65,000 – 75,000
- Website: mileofmusic.com

Mile of Music (also known as MoM or The Mile) is an annual all-original music festival located in downtown Appleton, Wisconsin. Started in 2013, the four-day festival runs the first weekend in August, Thursday through Sunday, and is a collaborative community event with support from nearly 50 business and community sponsors. The festival concept was created by marketing executive Dave Willems and Willems Marketing, Inc which specializes in community and non-profit projects. Willems recruited then Nashville-based touring artist and Appleton hometowner Cory Chisel to join the founding team along with Willems' staff.

The festival features original music of varying styles – from folk and indie rock to soul, alternative, R&B, blues, country, and others – with on average 225+ performers and nearly 1,000 total performances. Its focus is on showcasing largely undiscovered, touring musicians and bands with the mantra, "Artists you may not know but should." The festival is "cover-free," meaning no cover songs and no cover charges. Almost every show at the festival is free to the public.

The festival's success over the years has benefited the local community, through significant creative economic impact as well as local youth music education and other scholarships.

The festival spawned its own beer, the Americana Pale Ale by Stone Arch Brewpub.

== Events ==
The festival changes with each year, as it introduces more venues, and adds more charity events. The event is modeled after other music festivals, most notably South by Southwest in Austin, Texas.

=== Mile 1 (2013) ===
- Date: August 8–11, 2013
- Attendance: ~15,000 to 20,000

The inaugural year of the festival had over 220 performances in 40 venues. The 107 musical acts included Rodney Crowell, Justin Townes Earle, Cory Chisel, Hillary Reynolds Band, Nicole Atkins, The Candles and an unofficial appearance by Norah Jones.

=== Mile 2 (2014) ===
- Date: August 7–10, 2014
- Attendance: ~35,000

The Mile of Music's sophomore year had more than 60 venues, had more than 200 performers, and had 625 live performances. There were three 'main' stages for the festival, Lawrence University’s Memorial Chapel, and outdoor stages at Houdini Plaza and Jones Park. The festival generated nearly $2 million in economic development for the community. The four-day event featured Americana and Roots music.

Musical acts included performances by event co-founder Cory Chisel, The Autumn Defense, Sturgill Simpson, The Baseball Project and Butch Vig playing with The Emperors of Wyoming. Richie Ramone made a special guest appearance. Brooklyn-based Swear and Shake also returned for a surprise performance at Lawrence University’s Stansbury Theatre. The Milk Carton Kids were scheduled to headline but cancelled. They were replaced by an outlaw-themed show including Cory Chisel, Langhorne Slim and Ruby Amanfu.

New attractions included the Mile of Music bus, which festival goers could board to hear live music from performers and pop-up performances along the mile-long stretch of downtown Appleton. An expanded family-friendly music education series was also featured with over 30 events and workshops that offered different interactive experiences including bucket drumming and Balinese Gamelan. These events also included educators from the Appleton Area School District and Lawrence University.

This was the first year that the Mile of Music app was released for smartphones.

=== Mile 3 (2015) ===
- Date: August 6–9, 2015
- Attendance: ~50,000

The festival officially began on Thursday Aug. 6th, but a 'First Songs' concert was held the night before at the Fox Cities Performing Arts Center. The festival ended with a special concert called "Songs Before We Go," which was held at the Lawrence Memorial Chapel.

Musicians who partook in 2015 included The Milk Carton Kids, Roadkill Ghost Choir, Tim Barry, Swear and Shake, Wild Adriatic, Cory Chisel, The Suitcase Junket, The Crane Wives, Water Liars and Motherfolk.

As in the previous year, main stages were situated in the Memorial Chapel on Lawrence University's campus, and outdoor stages at the downtown Houdini Plaza and Jones Park. Some outdoor shows had to be moved indoors due to rain.

This was the first year that the "Artist Care Program" was offered.

More than 225 artists participated in 750 performances. Live music sets were held in more than 60 venues on or near College avenue and along the riverfront.

=== Mile 4 (2016) ===
- Date: August 4-7, 2016
- Attendance: ~60,000

240 bands and musicians performed 904 sets in the 2016 festival and included Aaron Lee Tasjan, Cory Chisel, Wild Adriatic, Jamie Kent and Kristin Diable.

Main stages were at the Lawrence Memorial Chapel, Houdini Plaza (outdoor), the OuterEdge Stage (indoor) and Jones Park (outdoor).

More than 65 downtown Appleton venues participated in the 2016 festival.

Mile of Music also hosted its first-ever hip-hop showcase at Lawrence University's Stansbury Theatre.

=== Mile 5 (2017) ===
- Date: August 3-6, 2017

The 2017 festival featured 70 downtown Appleton venues that hosted 950 live music sets from 250 artists.

Main stages included the Lawrence Memorial Chapel, Houdini Plaza, The OuterEdge Stage. Jones Park was under construction and will return for the 2019 festival. Washington Square served as a "replacement" for the park and became a popular venue. Festival organizers plan to utilize it as a permanent addition to the festival.

Artists included San Fermin, Ron Gallo, Bishop Gunn, Traveler, Tenement, Pudge, and Dan Rodriguez.

=== Mile 6 (2018) ===
- Date: August 2-5, 2018

=== Mile 7 (2019) ===
- Date: August 1-4, 2019

=== Mile 8 (2021) ===
- Date: August 5-8, 2021

The 2021 festival featured 40 downtown Appleton venues that hosted 700 live music sets from 200 artists.

Mile 8 was originally scheduled to occur in 2020 but was canceled due to the COVID-19 pandemic.

=== Mile 10 (2023) ===
- Date: August 3-6, 2023

=== Mile 11 (2024) ===
- Date: August 1-4, 2024

The 2024 festival featured over 200 artists at 40 venues.
