= Magnetic south (disambiguation) =

Magnetic south may refer to:

- South magnetic pole
- South Pole, one of the two points where the Earth's axis of rotation intersects its surface
- Magnetic South (album) an album from Michael Nesmith
