= The Heavils =

American alternative metal band

The Heavils were an American alternative metal band from Rockford, Illinois. They released two studio albums on Metal Blade Records: a self-titled album (2003) and Heavilution (2004). The band gained notoriety for playing homemade, fretless instruments built by vocalist/guitarist Brian Carter.

== History and style ==
In October 2002, The Pitch profiled the quartet's homemade instruments, which Carter constructed from objects including lamps, toilets and motorcycle parts. The paper reported that the recently formed band had begun attracting attention through performances across the Midwestern United States and Canada. In a 2003 CMJ New Music Report interview, Vaughn described the Meanies as five-string and fretless and credited Carter with building them.

The band released its self-titled Metal Blade debut in 2003. The album's 15 songs combined dissonant rock with groove and metal elements, with the homemade instruments central to its sound. In a 2004 interview, Vaughn said that the band had recently toured with Slipknot and Fear Factory and separately with Six Feet Under.

Heavilution was recorded in January 2004 at Greenhouse Studios in Vancouver and released on May 18. Devin Townsend produced the album. It included a cover of Cheap Trick's "Just Got Back", featuring Rick Nielsen on guitar and Miles Nielsen on vocals. Radio & Records selected Heavilution as its active-rock "Record of the Week" and ranked the album track "Outside the Circle" eighth on its Top 20 Specialty Artists chart.

AllMusic reviewer Stewart Mason wrote that Townsend's production subdued some of the Meanies' unusual harmonics and tunings, while the album's closing instrumental, "Kadigimonk", displayed the band's avant-garde side. Martin Popoff of Lollipop Magazine described the group's sound as a mixture of thrash, metalcore, progressive rock and alternative rock, and praised Townsend's production and the album's songwriting.

== Discography ==
- The Heavils (2003, Metal Blade)
- Heavilution (2004, Metal Blade)
