= The Traveling Kind =

Studio album by Emmylou Harris and Rodney Crowell
- Released: May 12, 2015
- Recorded: July 9–12, 14–15, 2014 (Sound Emporium) and October 12–13, 2014 (The House of Blues)
- Studios: Sound Emporium and The House of Blues Studios, Nashville, Tennessee, United States
- Genres: Country, folk
- Length: 40:41
- Label: Nonesuch
- Producer: Joe Henry

Emmylou Harris chronology
Hard Bargain (2011)	The Traveling Kind (2015)	The Complete Trio Collection (2016)

Rodney Crowell chronology
Tarpaper Sky (2014)	The Traveling Kind (2015)	Close Ties (2017)

The Traveling Kind is a 2015 studio album from American roots musicians Rodney Crowell and Emmylou Harris, their second collaboration after 2013's Old Yellow Moon. The album has received praise from critics. The duo managed to record this album more quickly than their former release, but took longer composing original songs, rather than focusing on cover versions, as with their last album.

== Reception ==
Editorial staff at AnyDecentMusic? aggregate reviews for this album at 7.3 out of 10, with nine reviews. Editors at AllMusic Guide gave The Traveling Kind 3.5 out of five stars, with reviewer Mark Deming noting "Harris' sweet, firm, very human tone as well as Crowell's outwardly cocky but inwardly perceptive voice, and the sweet and sour push and pull complements them both". John Paul of PopMatters scored this release an eight out of 10, praising the alternating moods of the lyrics and the musicians' sense of identity in the country music tradition, summing up, that there is "no better vocal pairing working today". Paste's Holly Gleason rated The Traveling Kind an 8.5 out of 10, also noting the diverse feelings present in the lyrics. In Rolling Stone, Corinne Cummings gave this release three out of five stars, noting that "their creative partnership sounds stronger than ever". For NPR's First Listen, Jewly Hight notes that the musicians "draw out the best in each other".

Jim Beviglia of American Songwriter scored the album four out of five stars, repeatedly noting how well the two musicians complement one another. Maeri Ferguson of Glide Magazine rated The Traveling Kind eight out of 10, opining that "the songs on this record sound like they just flowed out of them like the most natural thing in the world". For The Arts Desk, Thomas H. Green compares this release favorably to the duo's last collaboration, calling this "perhaps more spirited, and certainly a match for anything in either singer's recent solo back catalogue"; he rated it four out of five stars. In The Chicago Tribune, Greg Kot scored this album three out of four, noting a strength of this release over Old Yellow Moon is the introduction of new songs over cover versions. Elysa Gardner of USA Today scored The Traveling Kind 3.5 out of four stars, also praising the new compositions, as well as Harris' vocal strengths and the production work of Joe Henry.

== Track listing ==
1. "The Traveling Kind" (Cory Chisel, Rodney Crowell, and Emmylou Harris) – 3:40
2. "No Memories Hanging Round" (Crowell) – 3:41
3. "Bring It On Home to Memphis" (Crowell and Larry Klein) – 3:37
4. "You Can't Say We Didn't Try" (Chisel, Crowell, and Harris) – 3:26
5. "The Weight of the World" (Crowell and Harris) – 4:34
6. "Higher Mountains" (Crowell and Will Jennings) – 4:11
7. "I Just Wanted to See You So Bad" (Lucinda Williams) – 3:02
8. "Just Pleasing You" (Crowell and Mary Karr) – 4:21
9. "If You Lived Here You'd Be Home Now" (Crowell) – 2:59
10. "Her Hair Was Red" (Amy Allison) – 2:42
11. "Le Danse de la Joie" (Crowell, Harris, and Jennings) – 4:22

== Personnel ==
"The Traveling Kind"

- Rodney Crowell – acoustic guitar, vocals
- Emmylou Harris – vocals
- Byron House – double bass
- Jedd Hughes – mandolin
- Jerry Roe – drums
- Steuart Smith – classical guitar
- Chris Tuttle – piano

"No Memories Hanging Round"

- Rodney Crowell – acoustic guitar, vocals
- Emmylou Harris – vocals
- Steve Fishell – steel guitar
- Larry Franklin – violin
- Byron House – electric bass
- Jedd Hughes – electric guitar
- Bill Payne – piano
- Jerry Roe – drums

"Bring It On Home to Memphis"

- Rodney Crowell – acoustic guitar, vocals
- Emmylou Harris – vocals
- Byron House – double bass
- Jedd Hughes – electric guitar, backing vocals
- Jerry Roe – drums, backing vocals
- Steuart Smith – electric slide guitar
- Chris Tuttle – piano

"You Can't Say We Didn't Try"

- Rodney Crowell – acoustic guitar, vocals
- Emmylou Harris – vocals
- Steve Fishell – slide guitar
- Byron House – electric bass
- Jedd Hughes – electric guitar
- Bill Payne – Fender Rhodes electric piano, organ
- Jerry Roe – drums

"The Weight of the World"

- Rodney Crowell – acoustic guitar, vocals
- Emmylou Harris – vocals
- Byron House – double bass
- Jedd Hughes – electric guitar
- Bill Payne – Wurlitzer organ
- Jerry Roe – drums

"Higher Mountains"

- Rodney Crowell – acoustic guitar, vocals
- Emmylou Harris – vocals
- Byron House – double bass
- Jedd Hughes – octave guitar
- Bill Payne – piano
- Jerry Roe – drums
- Steuart Smith – electric guitar, piano, organ

"I Just Wanted to See You So Bad"

- Rodney Crowell – acoustic guitar, vocals
- Emmylou Harris – vocals
- Byron House – electric bass
- Jedd Hughes – electric guitar
- Bill Payne – piano
- Jerry Roe – drums
- Steuart Smith – organ

"Just Pleasing You"

- Rodney Crowell – acoustic guitar, vocals
- Emmylou Harris – backing vocals
- Larry Franklin – violin
- Byron House – double bass
- Jerry Roe – drums
- Chris Scruggs – steel guitar
- Steuart Smith – electric guitar

"If You Lived Here You'd Be Home Now"

- Rodney Crowell – acoustic guitar, vocals
- Emmylou Harris – backing vocals
- Steve Fishell – lap steel guitar
- Byron House – double bass
- Jedd Hughes – mandolin
- Jerry Roe – drums
- Steuart Smith – electric guitar
- Chris Tuttle – piano

"Her Hair Was Red"

- Rodney Crowell – vocals
- Emmylou Harris – vocals
- Jedd Hughes – octave guitar
- Steuart Smith – classical guitar, piano

"Le Danse De La Joie"

- Rodney Crowell – vocals
- Emmylou Harris – vocals
- Larry Franklin – violin
- Byron House – double bass
- Jedd Hughes – octave guitar, backing vocals
- Bill Payne – piano
- Jerry Roe – drums
- Steuart Smith – electric guitar
- Chris Tuttle – accordion

Technical personnel

- Adeline Brue – artwork
- Greg Calbi – mastering at Sterling Sound
- Doyle Partners – design
- Joe Henry – production
- David McClister – photography
- Justin Niebank – recording, mixing
- Chris Wilkinson – recording

== Release history ==
Release history and formats for The Traveling Kind
Region	Date	Format	Label
North America	May 12, 2015	LP; CD; music download	Nonesuch Records

== See also ==
- List of 2015 albums
