= Tarpaper Sky =

Studio album by Rodney Crowell
- Released: April 15, 2014
- Genres: Americana, country music
- Length: 42:11
- Label: New West
- Producers: Rodney Crowell, Steuart Smith, Dan Knobler

Rodney Crowell chronology
Old Yellow Moon (2013)	Tarpaper Sky (2014)	The Traveling Kind (2015)

Tarpaper Sky is the fourteenth solo studio album by Rodney Crowell. Crowell co-produced the album with long-time collaborator Steuart Smith and Dan Knobler. Tarpaper Sky follows Crowell's Grammy-winning duet album with Emmylou Harris, Old Yellow Moon and is his first release on New West.

Tarpaper Sky is made up of entirely original Crowell compositions. Doug Freeman of the Austin Chronicle credits Crowell for "balancing ballads and bar room stomps ... with his characteristic sense of autobiographical detail and precarious mortality."

The track, "God I'm Missing You," originally appeared on the 2012 Vanguard Records release Kin: Songs by Mary Karr & Rodney Crowell. Lucinda Williams performed the song on that compilation album. The phrase "Tarpaper Sky" appears in a line in that song.

== Critical reception ==
Professional ratings
Aggregate scores
Source	Rating
Metacritic	84/100
Review scores
Source	Rating
AllMusic	4/5 stars
American Songwriter	3.5/5 stars
The Austin Chronicle	3.5/5 stars
Blurt	4/5 stars
Chicago Tribune	3.5/4 stars
Country Weekly	A−
Exclaim!	9/10
The Independent	4/5 stars
Paste	7.3/10
Uncut	8/10
USA Today	3.5/4 stars

Tarpaper Sky garnered critical acclaim by music critics. At Metacritic, they assign a "weighted average" rating called a Metascore to albums based upon the ratings and reviews by selected independent publications, and the album's score is an 84 out of 100 with nine reviews used, which means the album received "universal acclaim". Thom Jurek of Allmusic rated the album four stars out of five, stating that "This is Crowell at his best: focused, balanced, clever, at times profound" on a release that is "a welcome return to form." At The Independent, Andy Gill rated the album four stars out of five, saying how the release "finds him relaxed and confident in his craft". Steve Johnson of the Chicago Tribune rated the album three-and-a-half stars out of four, writing that "With effortless melodies played with the grace and unforced power from a veteran band, 'Tarpaper Sky' showcases Crowell's still-potent voice, all honey and cedar and sly inflection, and his knack for finding the words to make simple wisdom and an older man's reflections resonate." At USA Today, Steve Jones rated the album three-and-a-half stars out of four, stating that this is a "fine collection of retro-sounding and embraceable tunes." At Country Weekly, Tammy Ragusa graded the album an A−, writing that "His lyrics are overflowing with imagery and meaning [...] both weighty and witty [...] and his voice is laden with texture."

Luke Torn of Uncut rated the album an eight out of a ten, writing how "Crowell’s versatile, impassioned voice is in fine fettle, a confident mix of goofiness and longing, anticipation and excitement, sadness and sentimentality, as if he’s just now entering a new prime." At American Songwriter, Hal Horowitz rated the album three-and-a-half stars out of five, saying that " the organic Tarpaper Sky is a welcome reminder that at 63 he remains capable of releasing beautifully crafted music that can stand toe to toe with his best." Stuart Henderson of Exclaim! rated the album a nine out of a ten, stating that "This is just vintage Crowell, which is to say that Tarpaper Sky is an essential record by one of the best." At The Austin Chronicle, Doug Freeman rated the album three-and-a-half stars out of five, writing how the release "proves that the Houston Kid in his 60s remains as vital as ever, balancing ballads and bar room stomps, both cut with his characteristic sense of autobiographical detail and precarious mortality." Eric R. Danton of Paste rated the album a seven-point-three out of ten, saying that "Though these 11 songs aren’t always as sharply drawn as his best material, there’s plenty to love here." At Blurt, Lee Zimmerman rated the album four stars out of five, stating that "Tarpaper Sky finds Crowell yet again emphasizing the superior songwriting skills that have been his stock in trade since the very beginning."

== Track listing ==
All songs were written by Rodney Crowell except where noted.

1. "The Long Journey Home" - 4:23
2. "Fever on the Bayou" (Crowell, Will Jennings) - 3:57
3. "Frankie Please" - 2:43
4. "God I'm Missing You" (Crowell, Mary Karr) - 3:55
5. "Famous Last Words of a Fool in Love" - 3:50
6. "Somebody's Shadow" (Crowell, Quinten Collier) - 3:29
7. "Grandma Loved That Old Man" - 3:43
8. "Jesus Talk to Mama" - 3:40
9. "I Wouldn't Be Me Without You" - 3:28
10. "The Flyboy & The Kid" - 3:55
11. "Oh, What a Beautiful World" - 5:08

== Personnel ==
- Rodney Crowell - lead vocal, acoustic guitar and electric guitar
- Steuart Smith - lead electric and acoustic guitar, mandolin, bass, organ, harmonica and harmony vocals
- Michael Rhodes - bass
- John Hobbs - piano
- Eddie Bayers - drums and piano

=== Guest performances ===
- Michael Rojas - piano
- Steve Fishell - steel guitar
- Deanie Richardson - fiddle
- Will Kimbrough - acoustic guitar, accordion & harmony vocals
- Dan Knobler - electric guitar
- Jerry Roe - drums
- Shannon McNally - vocal
- John Cowan - harmony vocals
- Pat Buchanan - harmony vocals
- Cory Chisel - harmony vocals
- Mike Ferris - harmony vocals
- Perry Coleman - harmony vocals
- Chely Wright - harmony vocals
- Tanya Hancheroff - harmony vocals
- Vicki Hampton - harmony vocals
- Robert Bailey - harmony vocals
- Vince Gill - harmony vocals
- Ronnie McCoury - harmony vocals

== Chart performance ==
The album debuted at No. 168 on the Billboard 200, and at No. 25 on the Top Country Albums chart with 3,000 copies sold in its debut week.

Chart (2014)	Peak position
US Billboard 200	168
US Top Country Albums (Billboard)	25
US Independent Albums (Billboard)	32
