= Sunshine (Jonathan Edwards song) =

Single by Jonathan Edwards

from the album Jonathan Edwards
- B-side: "Emma"
- Released: November 1971
- Recorded: 1971
- Genre: Country folk, country rock, pop
- Length: 2:16
- Label: Capricorn
- Songwriter: Jonathan Edwards
- Producer: Peter Casperson

Jonathan Edwards singles chronology
"Sunshine" (1971)	"Train of Glory" (1972)

"Sunshine" is a folk rock song from 1971 by Jonathan Edwards, released as the first single from his debut album Jonathan Edwards. The single reached No. 4 on the Billboard Hot 100 chart on January 15, 1972, and earned a gold record.

"Sunshine" was not originally planned for release, but when an engineer accidentally erased the master of a track called "Please Find Me" near the end of sessions for the album, "Sunshine" was used to fill the hole.

The song was released as a single and first gained popularity on Boston radio, before going nationwide. Regarding its success, Edwards stated, "It was just at the time of the Vietnam War and Nixon. It was looking bad out there. That song meant a lot to a lot of people during that time—especially me."

"Sunshine" bears some melodic resemblance to the traditional country blues song "Green Rocky Road", popularized in the 1960s by folk singers Len Chandler and Dave van Ronk.

== Charts ==
=== Weekly charts ===
Chart (1971–1972)	Peak position
Australia (Kent Music Report)	45
Canada RPM Top Singles	3
Canada RPM Adult Contemporary	11
Ireland (IRMA)	4
U.S. Billboard Hot 100	4
U.S. Billboard Easy Listening	7

=== Year-end charts ===
Chart (1972)	Rank
Canada Top Singles (RPM)	27
U.S. Billboard Hot 100	37
U.S. Cash Box	34

- Jonathan Edwards recorded and released a bluegrass version of "Sunshine" (along with an entire album) with the band The Seldom Scene.

== Covers ==
In 1980, Juice Newton scored a top-40 hit, peaking at No. 35 on the Billboard country chart with her version of "Sunshine".

Paul Westerberg's cover is featured on the Friends soundtrack.

The Isley Brothers also cut a version of this song for 3 + 3.

== See also ==
- List of anti-war songs
