= Jonathan Edwards (album) =

Studio album by Jonathan Edwards
- Released: November 1971
- Studio: Intermedia Sound Inc., Boston, Massachusetts
- Genre: Country rock, folk rock, blues rock, bluegrass
- Label: Capricorn
- Producer: Peter Casperson

Jonathan Edwards chronology
Jonathan Edwards (1971)	Honky-Tonk Stardust Cowboy (1972)

Singles from Jonathan Edwards
- 1. "Sunshine" Released: 1971

Jonathan Edwards is the first album by the singer-songwriter Jonathan Edwards. The album received some mainstream attention thanks to the catchy political-pop single, "Sunshine". Several FM stations also played the drug-related song "Shanty".

== Track listing ==
All tracks written by Jonathan Edwards, except where noted.

No.	Title	Writer(s)	Length
1.	"Everybody Knows Her"		1:53
2.	"Cold Snow"		2:19
3.	"Athens County"	Edwards, Joe Dolce	2:45
4.	"Dusty Morning"		2:18
5.	"Emma"	Edwards, Bob Brannon	3:39
6.	"Shanty"		2:32
7.	"Sunshine"		2:16
8.	"The King"		2:50
9.	"Don't Cry Blue"	Malcolm McKinney	2:42
10.	"Jesse"		3:02
11.	"Sometimes"	Malcolm McKinney	2:47
12.	"Train of Glory"		3:29

== Charts ==
Charts (1971-72)	Peak position
Australia (Kent Music Report)	40
US Billboard Top LPs	42

== Personnel ==
- Jonathan Edwards – vocal, guitar, harp, bass guitar

Additional musicians

- Richard Adelman – drums
- Bill Keith – banjo
- Jef Labes – keyboard
- Eric Lilljequist – guitar
- Stuart Schulman – bass guitar, violin

Technical personnel

- Peter Casperson – production
- Michael Leary – engineering
- Nancy Lopes – photography
- Jimm Roberts – album design
- Bob Runstein – engineer
