= Tell Me True (album) =

- Artwork for the 2017 album

Studio album by Cory Chisel and Adriel Denae
- Released: August 4, 2017
- Recorded: The Refuge, Appleton, Wisconsin
- Genre: Folk rock
- Length: 34:58
- Label: Refuge Foundation for the Arts
- Producer: Dan Knobler

Singles from Tell Me True
- 1. "Songbird" Released: July 5, 2017

Tell Me True is an album by Cory Chisel and Adriel Denae. It was recorded at The Refuge in Appleton, Wisconsin and Nashville, Tennessee, and released in 2017.

== Track listing ==
No.	Title	Length
1.	"Songbird"	3:26
2.	"Spend It All"	3:20
3.	"Hard Leaving Love"	2:51
4.	"Deeper Love"	4:04
5.	"Tell Me True"	2:40
6.	"Southern Arms"	2:58
7.	"Lose Our Way"	3:22
8.	"Guess I Never Knew You"	2:07
9.	"Songbird Interlude"	1:18
10.	"Just Pleasing You"	3:44
11.	"Well Beyond Your Years"	3:18
12.	"Rhodes Interlude"	1:45
