= Sailboat (album) =

Studio album by Jonathan Edwards
- Released: 1977
- Studio: Enactron Truck, Los Angeles, California
- Genre: Rock/pop, singer-songwriter, folk
- Label: Warner Bros.
- Producer: Brian Ahern for Happy Sack Productions

Jonathan Edwards chronology
| Rockin' Chair (1976) | Sailboat (1977) | Live! (1980) |

Sailboat is the fifth studio album (sixth overall) released by the singer-songwriter Jonathan Edwards. It was released in 1977.

== Track listing ==
All tracks composed by Jonathan Edwards, except where indicated.

1. "Blow on Chilly Wind" (Jesse Winchester) – 3:16
2. "Evangelina" (Hoyt Axton, Kenneth Higginbotham) – 3:40
3. "Sailboat" – 3:03
4. "People Get Ready" (Curtis Mayfield) – 3:00
5. "How About You" (Jesse Winchester) – 3:24
6. "Girl from the Canyon" – 2:34
7. "Weapon of Prayer" (Ira Louvin, Charlie Louvin) – 3:23
8. "Never Together (But Close Sometimes)" (Rodney Crowell) – 2:06
9. "Carolina Caroline" – 3:13
10. "Let the Rough Side Drag" (Jesse Winchester) – 2:59

== Personnel ==
- Jonathan Edwards – lead vocals, acoustic guitar, backing vocals
- Albert Lee, Brian Ahern – electric guitar
- Brian Ahern, Emmylou Harris, Rodney Crowell – acoustic guitar
- Emory Gordy, Jr. – bass
- Hank DeVito – steel guitar
- Mike Auldridge – resonator guitar
- Herb Pedersen – banjo
- Albert Lee – mandolin
- Glen Hardin – keyboards
- John Ware – percussion
- Dianne Brooks, Emmylou Harris, Herb Pedersen – backing vocals
- Richard Greene – strings

Technical

- Bradley Hartman, Brian Ahern, Donivan Cowart, Miles Wilkinson, Stuart Taylor - "technical talent"
- Tom Wilkes - artwork
