= Old Yellow Moon =

Studio album by Emmylou Harris and Rodney Crowell
- Released: February 26, 2013
- Recorded: 2012
- Genres: Country, folk
- Length: 41:06
- Label: Nonesuch
- Producer: Brian Ahern

Emmylou Harris chronology
Hard Bargain (2011)	Old Yellow Moon (2013)	The Traveling Kind (2015)

Rodney Crowell chronology
Sex & Gasoline (2008)	Old Yellow Moon (2013)	Tarpaper Sky (2014)

Professional ratings
Aggregate scores
Source	Rating
Metacritic	(7.5/10); 75/100, 14 critics
Review scores
Source	Rating
Aftonbladet	link
AllMusic	link
The Independent	link
Paste	link
Rock Cellar	link
Rolling Stone Germany	link
Slant Magazine	link
Stereo Subversion	B+ link
Uncut	link
USA Today	link
Vue Weekly	link

Old Yellow Moon is a collaborative album by American country music singer-songerwriters Emmylou Harris and Rodney Crowell, released on February 26, 2013, in the United States by Nonesuch Records. It is the 27th and 14th studio album for Harris and Crowell, respectively, as well as Harris's fifth album for Nonesuch Records. The duo followed up this collaboration with The Traveling Kind two years later.

Produced by Harris' ex-husband and longtime producer Brian Ahern, Old Yellow Moon was recorded in 2012 at Eastern Island Sounds and Ronnie's Place, both in Nashville.

== Album information ==
Old Yellow Moon is the latest of many collaborative projects of Emmylou Harris and Rodney Crowell and the first that ultimately resulted in an entire album. As both artists have stated multiple times, the duet album was being planned for a long time. In the liner notes of Harris' 2007 Songbird: Rare Tracks and Forgotten Gems box set she writes that "we've been talking for 34 years about doing a duet record, and I swear we're going to do it."

Having met nearly 40 years before the release of this album, in 1974, the two started working together almost instantly, by recording the Crowell-penned "Bluebird Wine". The song became the opening number for Harris's 1975 Pieces of the Sky album and has been re-recorded for Old Yellow Moon with slightly altered lyrics and, for a change, Rodney Crowell singing lead.

During 1975, Crowell became part of Harris' backing band "The Hot Band". As such he toured with her and is featured as musician on most of her 1970s and 1980s albums. In addition, Emmylou Harris has recorded roughly 20 Crowell-composed songs over the years, such as "I Ain't Living Long Like This", "Leaving Louisiana in the Broad Daylight" and "Till I Gain Control Again". Emmylou returned the favor and can be heard prominently as backing vocalist and musician on Crowell's debut LP Ain't Living Long Like This, released in 1978.

The disc was another Top 10 Country album for Harris and won her a 13th Grammy Award in 2014 for "Best Americana Album".

=== Song information ===
- The first song from Old Yellow Moon that was made available to the public was its opening number "Hanging Up My Heart", which was uploaded to YouTube in December 2012.
- For this record, the duo mostly revisits older compositions, such the aforementioned "Bluebird Wine" and the Crowell-penned "Here We Are", which was recorded by Emmylou and George Jones in 1979 for his My Very Special Guests album.
- Also included is Roger Miller's "Invitation To The Blues", which was a US Country top-3 hit for Ray Price in 1958.
- "Spanish Dancer" was written and recorded by Patti Scialfa for her Rumble Doll in 1993. On Old Yellow Moon, the song becomes a typical Emmylou ballad, much like Matraca Berg's 1997 single "Back When We Were Beautiful", in which Emmylou convincingly portrays an aging woman.
- "Open Season on My Heart", partly written by Crowell, was previously recorded in 2004 by Tim McGraw for his album Live Like You Were Dying.
- "Chase The Feeling", which together with "Black Caffeine" offers a somehow different and "harder" sound compared to the album's other tracks, was penned by Kris Kristofferson and released on his 2006 album This Old Road.
- "Dreaming My Dreams" was written by Allen Reynolds, who produced a couple of albums for Emmylou Harris on the early 1990s: the much acclaimed Cowgirl's Prayer and At the Ryman. Originally "Dreaming My Dreams With You", the song was a top 10 hit for Waylon Jennings and provided the title to his twenty-second album.
- "Bull Rider" was written by Crowell for Johnny Cash, who recorded it for his 1979 album Silver. When released on single in 1980, the song eventually reached number 66 on the US Country charts.
- The album's title track is yet another composition by Hank DeVito, another member of Harris's "Hot Band" from the 1970s.

== Track listing ==
No.	Title	Writer(s)	Length
1.	"Hanging Up My Heart"	Hank DeVito	2:52
2.	"Invitation to the Blues"	Roger Miller	3:38
3.	"Spanish Dancer"	Patti Scialfa	3:44
4.	"Open Season on My Heart"	Rodney Crowell, James T. Slater	3:41
5.	"Chase the Feeling"	Kris Kristofferson	3:31
6.	"Black Caffeine"	Donivan Cowart, DeVito	3:23
7.	"Dreaming My Dreams"	Allen Reynolds	3:18
8.	"Bluebird Wine"	Crowell	2:56
9.	"Back When We Were Beautiful"	Matraca Berg	3:40
10.	"Here We Are"	Crowell	3:15
11.	"Bull Rider"	Crowell	3:05
12.	"Old Yellow Moon"	DeVito, Lynn Langham	3:37
Total length:			40:40

== Personnel ==
- Emmylou Harris – vocals, acoustic guitar, tambourine
- Rodney Crowell – vocals, acoustic guitar

=== Additional musicians ===
- Brian Ahern – acoustic bass, acoustic guitar, electric baritone guitar
- James Burton – electric guitar
- Chad Cromwell – drums
- Dennis Crouch – bass
- Stuart Duncan – banjo, fiddle, mandolin
- Larry Franklin – fiddle
- Paul Franklin – steel guitar
- Vince Gill – classical guitar, vocals
- Marco Giovani – drums
- Emory Gordy Jr. – bass
- Glen Hardin – electric piano
- John Hobbs – piano
- Jim Hoke – accordion
- Jedd Hughes – electric guitar
- David Hungate – double bass, bass guitar
- John Jorgenson – electric guitar, mandolin
- Lynn Langham – piano
- Bill Payne – Hammond B-3 organ, piano
- Mickey Raphael – bass harmonica
- Michael Rhodes – bass
- Steuart Smith – electric slide guitar, electric guitar, mandocello
- Tommy Spurlock – steel guitar
- John Ware – drums
- Reese Wynans – piano

=== Recording staff ===
- Brian Ahern – producer
- Shannon Ahern – production assistant
- Chuck Ainlay – engineer
- John Baldwin – assistant engineer
- Donivan Cowart – engineer
- Bob Ludwig – mastering engineer
- Noland O'Boyle – assistant engineer

== Charts ==
=== Weekly charts ===
Chart (2013)	Peak position
Belgian Albums (Ultratop Flanders)	38
Belgian Albums (Ultratop Wallonia)	115
Danish Albums (Hitlisten)	32
Dutch Albums (Album Top 100)	22
Finnish Albums (Suomen virallinen lista)	24
French Albums (SNEP)	161
German Albums (Offizielle Top 100)	71
Irish Albums (IRMA)	33
New Zealand Albums (RMNZ)	24
Norwegian Albums (VG-lista)	6
Scottish Albums (Official Charts)	32
Swedish Albums (Sverigetopplistan)	12
Swiss Albums (Schweizer Hitparade)	47
UK Albums (Official Charts)	42
UK Country Albums (Official Charts)	1
US Billboard 200	29
US Top Country Albums (Billboard)	4
US Americana/Folk Albums (Billboard)	3

=== Year-end charts ===
Chart (2013)	Position
US Top Country Albums (Billboard)	60

== Release history ==
Release history and formats for Old Yellow Moon
Region	Date	Format	Label	Ref.
North America	February 26, 2013	CD; music download	Nonesuch Records	
