= Cory Chisel and The Wandering Sons =

American folk rock band

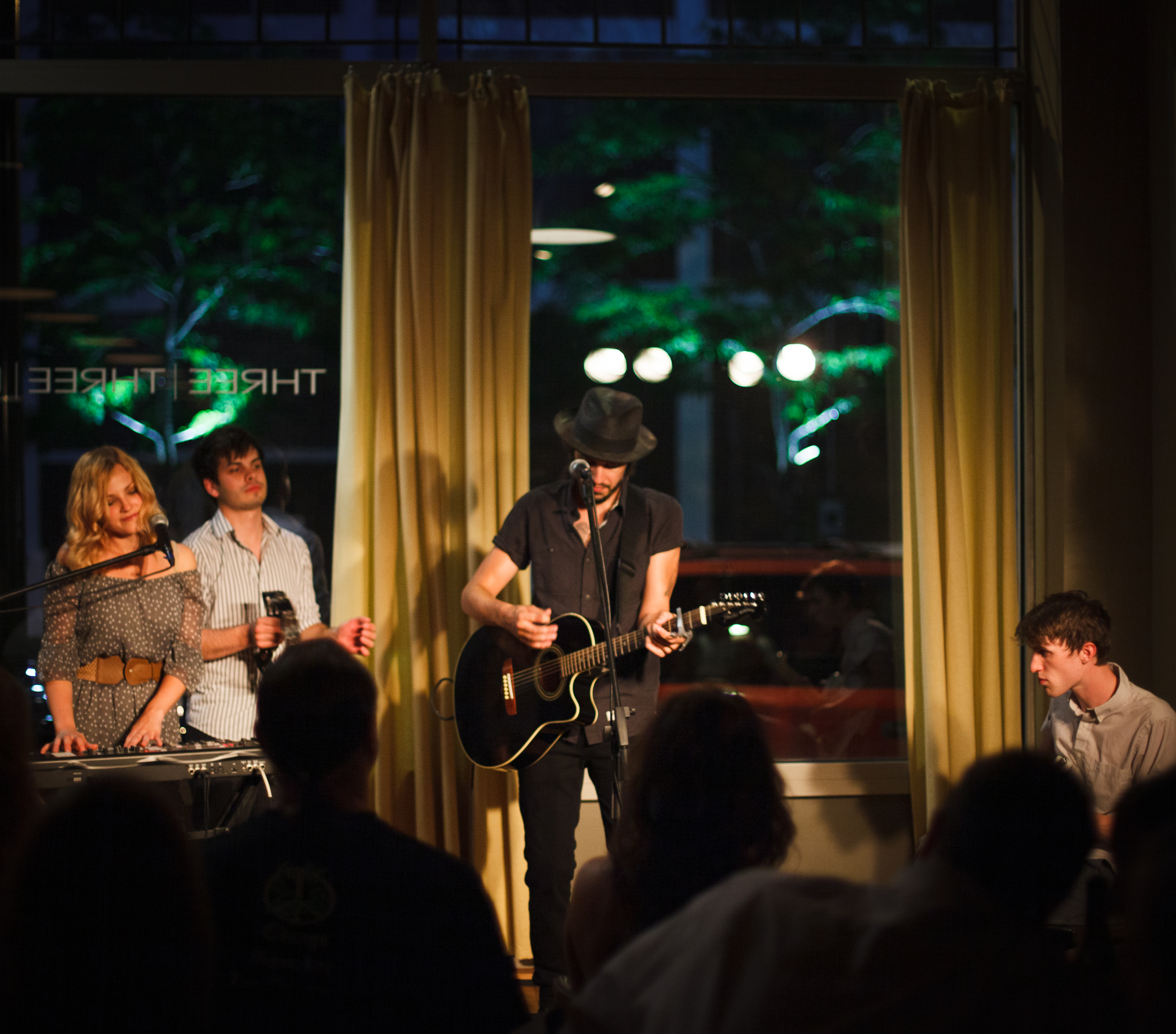
- Cory Chisel and The Wandering Sons performing in July 2012

Background information
- Genres: Folk rock, Americana
- Years active: 2004 – present
- Label: RCA
- Members: Cory Chisel, Alex Drossart, Samuel James Farrell
- Past members: Adriel Denae, Noah Harris, Miles Nielsen, Daniel McMahon, Rick Setser, Paul Mannone, Adam Plamann, Charles Koltak

Cory Chisel and The Wandering Sons are an American folk rock band formed in Appleton, Wisconsin in 2004. The band has released six records, including two with RCA Records.

In addition to Cory Chisel, the band has consisted of a varying cast of musicians as it has recorded, toured, and made appearances. Members have included Adriel Denae, Daniel McMahon, Miles Nielsen, Daxx Nielsen, Noah Harris, Rick Setser, Adam Plamann, Samuel James Farrell, and Alex Drossart.

== History ==
The band released their debut album Again From the Beginning in 2004, followed by Darken Your Door (EP) in 2005. During that time, the band built a strong following in and around Appleton, Wisconsin, allowing the members of the band to support themselves as independent musicians. The turning point towards wider exposure came in 2006 with the self-released album Little Bird, which gained the attention of major record labels and led to a showcase in Los Angeles, with the band subsequently signing with the RCA Records imprint Black Seal.

Under the RCA Records label, the band released Cabin Ghosts (EP) in 2008 and Death Won't Send A Letter in 2009. Cabin Ghosts was recorded at Chisel's family cabin in rural Wisconsin and at a live performance in Appleton. Death Won't Send A Letter was recorded at Blackbird Studio in Nashville and Sunset Sound in Los Angeles, and produced by Joe Chiccarelli, with Brendan Benson and Jack Lawrence also contributing.

Tours and appearances in support of Cabin Ghosts and Death Won't Send A Letter included a tour with Josh Ritter, performances on "Late Night with Jimmy Fallon" in 2009, at Glastonbury Festival and The Newport Folk Festival in 2010, and at Bonnaroo Music Festival in 2011.

Death Won't Send A Letter received strong reviews and the band was gaining a growing following through touring, however, RCA soon eliminated the Black Seal imprint and the band no longer had a label. In 2011, Chisel and Denae relocated to Nashville, and Old Believers was recorded at Welcome to 1979 studio in Nashville, produced by Brendan Benson, and released in 2012 on Benson's label Readymade Records.

In 2012, the band toured in support of Norah Jones, and also performed on "Conan" and "The Late Show with David Letterman."

== Discography ==
- Again from the Beginning (2004)
- Darken Your Door (2005)
- Little Bird (2006)
- Cabin Ghosts (2008)
- Death Won't Send A Letter (2009)
- Old Believers (2012)

== Awards ==
In 2016, Chisel received a Grammy-nomination for Best American Roots Song for "The Traveling Kind," which he cowrote with Emmylou Harris and Rodney Crowell. Chisel was named Artist of the Year at the 2010 Wisconsin Area Music Industry awards. The song "Born Again" was awarded Song of the Year and Death Won't Send a Letter was named Record of the Year.
