= Daniel McMahon =

American musician (1982–2024)

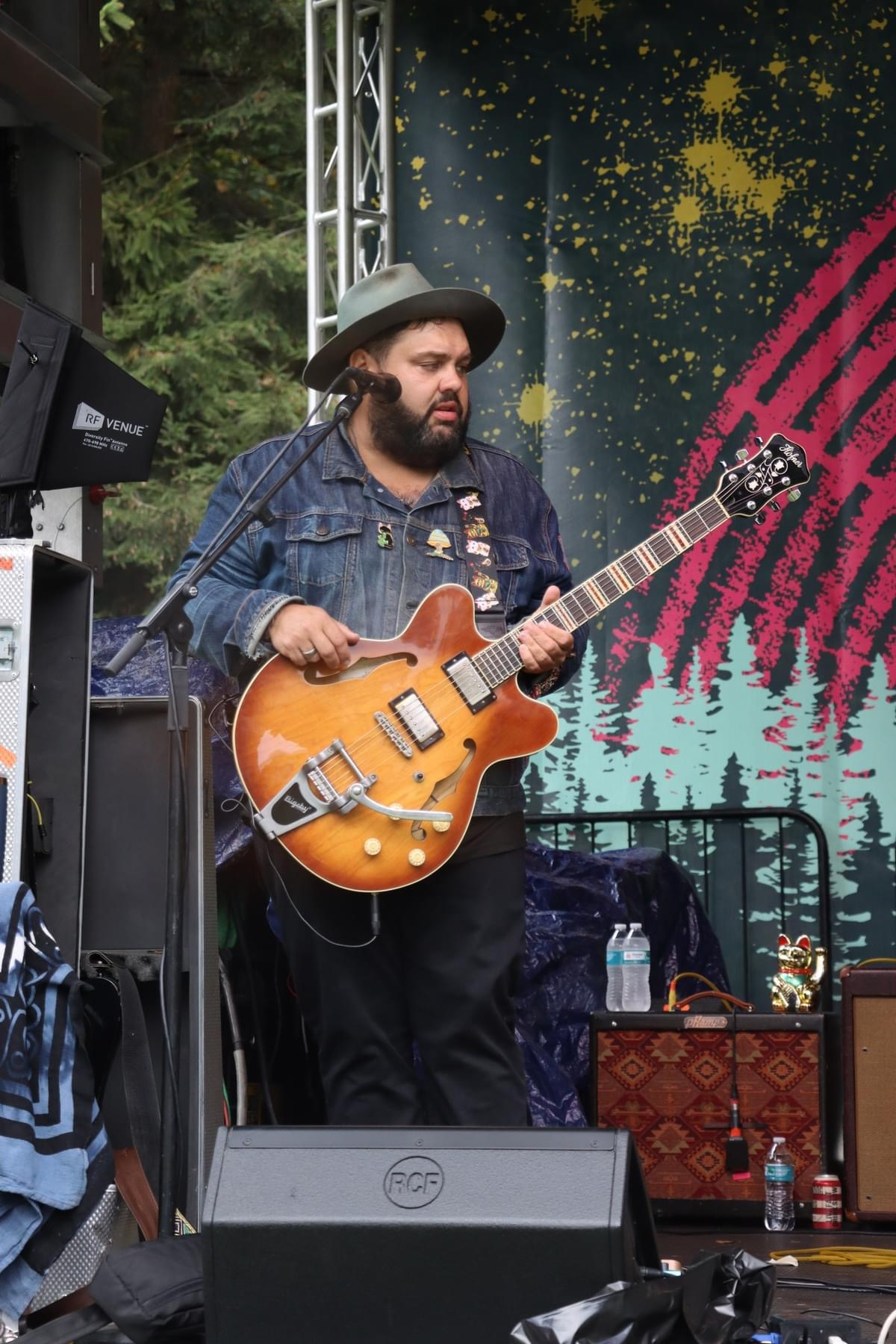
McMahon in 2023

Daniel James McMahon (November 1982 – September 19, 2024) was an American multi-instrumentalist, record producer, and audio engineer from Rockford, Illinois. Together with Miles Nielsen, he composed original music for the 2009 documentary film Undefeated, which won the Academy Award for Best Documentary Feature on February 26, 2012. Michael Brook also composed original music for the film.

McMahon played, toured, and recorded with numerous Midwestern musicians and bands, including Cory Chisel and The Wandering Sons, Miles Nielsen (as part of The Rusted Hearts), and Cameron McGill (as part of What Army), among others. He recorded with all three of these groups, as well as Trapper Schoepp & The Shades, on their respective Daytrotter sessions. His production and accompaniment work with Wisconsin folk-pop duo, Daniel and the Lion, helped the brothers attract the attention of Counting Crows frontman Adam Duritz, who invited the full band to play his Outlaw Roadshow showcase in New York City (as part of the 2013 CMJ Music Marathon festival) and called them, "The best pop band we've ever had at the Roadshow." At the close of day 1 of the Roadshow showcase, McMahon performed onstage with Counting Crows.

In addition to his primary performer role as guitarist and backing vocalist of Miles Nielsen and The Rusted Hearts, he recorded and played with Bun E. Carlos (of Cheap Trick) in The Monday Night Band, which performed exclusively on Monday nights.

On April 2, 2012, Rockford, Illinois, Mayor Larry Morrissey declared April 2012 Dan Lindsay, Dan McMahon, and Miles Nielsen month in the City of Rockford for their work on Undefeated. Also in 2012, he received the Outstanding Achievement Award from the Rockford Area Music Industry (RAMI) organization and scored the 12 minute-long short film that helped the Rockford Park District win the 2012 National Gold Medal Award for Excellence in Park and Recreation from the National Recreation and Park Association (NRPA).

He owned and co-operated The Midwest Sound, a farm-house recording studio on the outskirts of Rockford, Illinois, and was a two-time RAMI Award winner (2013 and 2014) for Best Recording Studio.

On September 19, 2024, McMahon died following a battle with esophageal cancer. He was 41.

== Selected discography ==
=== Albums ===
- Daniel Rodriguez (2023) Glimpse of Infinity (single) (guitar/organ)
- High Water (2022) with Irene's Entropy (engineer / producer)
- This is Life (Merry Christmas) – The Lumineers (organ)
- Don't ever change (feat. Rick Nielsen) (2021) – Hanson (engineer)
- Daniel Rodriguez (2020) – Sojourn of The Burning Sun (guitar / organ)
- Echo and Gone (2020) – Daniel McMahon (engineer, producer, compose, instrumentalist)
- Social Distance (2020) Daniel McMahon and Darren Garvey (engineer, producer, compose, instrumentalist)
- OHBAHOY (2019) with Miles Nielsen and The Rusted Hearts (musician)
- The Piasa Bird (2016) – with J. Hardin (engineering/musician)
- Tired Dogs, Old Trees (2014) – with Derek Luttrell (engineering and production/musician)
- Here's How it Works (2014) – with The Mike Benign Compulsion
- Midnight Reruns (2013) – with Midnight Reruns (engineering)
- Final Night (2013) – with Daniel and The Lion (engineering and production/musician)
- Death Head (2013) – with Daniel and The Lion (engineering and production credits/musician)
- Can't Wait (2013) – with Sugarstems
- Too Much to Lose (2013) – with Ron Rawhoof
- Haymaker (2012) – with Hayward Williams
- One May Morning (2012) – with Sarah Pray
- Great Divide (2012) – with The Great Divide
- Presents The Rusted Hearts (2011) – with Miles Nielsen and The Rusted Hearts
- Run, Engine, Run (2011) – with Trapper Schoepp & The Shades
- Sweet Teeth (2011) – with Daniel and The Lion (full engineering and production credits)
- Is a Beast (2011) – with Cameron McGill & What Army
- House of Doors (2010) – with Amy Petty
- Cotton Bell (2010) – with Hayward Williams
- Miles (2009) – with Miles Nielsen
- Warm Songs for Cold Shoulders (2009) – with Cameron McGill & What Army
- Highway Specific (2009) – with Matthew Davies
- A Long List of Lies (2008) – with Josh Harty
- Cabin Ghosts (2008) – with Cory Chisel and The Wandering Sons
- Another Sailor's Dream (2007) – with Hayward Williams
- Long Gone (2006) – with Blueheels
- Little Bird (2006) – with Cory Chisel and The Wandering Sons
- Minimalist & Anchored (2006) – with Heller Mason
- Carry it Around (2006) – with The New Kentucky Quarter
- Again from the Beginning (2004) – with The Wandering Sons
- Alice Street and More (2003) – with Breathing Machine

=== EPs ===
- Even Hitler Had a Girlfriend 7" (2014) – with Dr. Frank
- Already Gone/Skyway 7" (2012) – with Limbeck
- St. Louis Sessions (2012) – with Miles Nielsen and The Rusted Hearts
- Deserters (2010) – with Cameron McGill & What Army
- Madeline, Every Girl (2010) – with Cameron McGill & What Army
- No Harm, No Foul (2009) – with Nathaniel Waldschmidt
- Two Hits and a Miss (2009) – with Cameron McGill & What Army
- Long Long Road (2008) – with Kelly Steward
- Ten Tiny Little Pieces (2007) – with Martha Berner
- Darken Your Door (2005) – with The Wandering Sons
