= Honky-Tonk Stardust Cowboy =

Studio album by Jonathan Edwards
- Released: 1972
- Studio: Intermedia Sound, Boston; Electric Lady Studios, New York City; "Paper Doll" recorded live at A&R Studios, New York City
- Genre: Country rock, folk rock
- Label: Originally released on Atco Records; Reissue & Remaster on Collectors' Choice
- Producer: Peter Casperson

Jonathan Edwards chronology
Jonathan Edwards (1971)	Honky-Tonk Stardust Cowboy (1972)	Have a Good Time for Me (1973)

Professional ratings
Review scores
Source	Rating
AllMusic	4/5 stars
The Encyclopedia of Popular Music	3/5 stars

Honky-Tonk Stardust Cowboy is the second studio album by the singer-songwriter Jonathan Edwards, released in 1972.

The album peaked at #167 on the Billboard 200 album chart.

== Critical reception ==
AllMusic called the album "just as strong musically" as the debut, writing that it is "more laid-back, with a sound and delivery reminiscent of the well-crafted material on Dillard & Clark's The Fantastic Expedition of Dillard & Clark and Through the Morning, Through the Night."

== Track listing ==
All tracks composed by Jonathan Edwards; except where indicated

1. "Stop and Start It All Again"
2. "Everything"
3. "Longest Ride"
4. "Give Us a Song"
5. "Dues Days Bar"
6. "Morning Train" (Traditional; arranged by Elena Mezzetti)
7. "Ballad of Upsy Daisy" (Joe Dolce)
8. "It's a Beautiful Day"
9. "Sugar Babe" (Jesse Colin Young)
10. "Dream Song"
11. "Paper Doll" (Johnny S. Black)
12. "Honky-Tonk Stardust Cowboy" (Darrell Statler)
13. "That's What Our Life Is"

== Personnel ==
- Jonathan Edwards – vocals, guitar, harmonica, mandolin; bass on "That's What Our Life Is"
- Eric Lilljequist – lead guitar, harmony vocals
- Bill Keith – steel guitar, banjo
- Stuart Schulman – bass guitar, piano, string arrangements
- Richard Adelman – drums
- Dean Adrien – conga drum
- Chandler Travis – maracas
- Elena Mezzetti – arrangement on "Morning Train"

Technical

- Bob Runstein, Dave Palmer - engineer
- Kristine Weaver - photography
