= Live! (Jonathan Edwards album) =

Live album by Jonathan Edwards
- Released: 1980
- Recorded: September 13, 14 and 17, 1980
- Venue: The Hot Tin Roof, Martha's Vineyard, Massachusetts; The Paradise Theatre, Boston, Massachusetts
- Label: Original release: Chronic Records; Re-release: Wounded Bird Records
- Producer: Jonathan Edwards; Greg Morton

Jonathan Edwards chronology
Sailboat (1977)	Live! (1980)	Blue Ridge (1985)

Live! is the second live album (seventh total album) released by the singer-songwriter Jonathan Edwards. It was recorded in September 1980 and released later that year.

== Reception ==
Professional ratings
Review scores
Source	Rating
AllMusic	3/5 stars

AllMusic gave Live! three out of five stars.

== Track listing ==
1. "Sunshine" – 3:15
2. "Sailboat" – 3:05
3. "Daddy's Gone Singin'" – 2:54
4. "Lady" – 5:04
5. "Medley: Don't Cry Blue/Athens County" – 5:13
6. "Everybody Knows Her" – 2:42
7. "Emma" – 4:16
8. "Shanty" – 11:14
9. "Sometimes" – 4:21

== Personnel ==
- Jim Biggins – saxophone
- Amy Brogger – producer
- R.Z. Bunk – bass
- Steve Canava – audio engineer
- James Collier – composer
- Tim Collins – personal manager
- Gerald M. Cordasco – drums
- Bob DeMuth – audio engineer
- Joe Dolce – composer
- Jonathan Edwards – guitar, harmonica, piano, producer, vocals
- Jeff Golub – guitar
- Peggy Greene – photography
- John Kimbrough – composer
- Malcolm McKinney – composer
- Fred Meuller – production crew
- Greg Morto] – producer, production crew
- William O'Connell – photography
- Jon Pousette-Dart – guest appearance
- Steve "Spaz" Schnee – digital transfers
- Starfleet Blair – audio engineer
- Livingston Taylor – guest appearance
- Brian Walker – production crew
- Howie Weinberg – mastering
- Cheryl Wheeler – vocals
- Kenny White – keyboards, vocals
- Steve Whitney – percussion

Adapted from Allmusic.
