= Death Won't Send A Letter =

- Artwork for the 2009 album

Studio album by Cory Chisel and The Wandering Sons
- Released: September 29, 2009
- Recorded: Blackbird Studio, Nashville, TN
- Genre: Indie Rock
- Length: 39:44
- Label: RCA
- Producer: Joe Chiccarelli

Cory Chisel and The Wandering Sons chronology
Cabin Ghosts (2008)	Death Won't Send A Letter (2009)	Old Believers (2012)

Singles from Death Won't Send A Letter
- 1. "Born Again" Released: September 29, 2009

Death Won't Send A Letter is the 2009 album by Cory Chisel and The Wandering Sons. The album was produced by Joe Chiccarelli, and in addition to Cory Chisel, other artists who worked on the album include Brendan Benson, “Little Jack” Lawrence and Patrick Keeler of The Raconteurs, and Carl Broemel of My Morning Jacket.

== Track listing ==
No.	Title	Length
1.	"Born Again"	3:50
2.	"Calm Down"	3:35
3.	"Longer Time At Sea"	3:12
4.	"Angel of Mine"	3:03
5.	"My Heart Would Be There"	4:17
6.	"Curious Thing"	4:57
7.	"So Wrong With Me"	2:41
8.	"What Do You Need"	4:13
9.	"Love Is Gone"	3:34
10.	"Tennessee"	2:59
11.	"Mocking Bird"	3:20
