= Old Believers (album) =

2012 studio album by Cory Chisel and the Wandering Sons

- Artwork for the 2012 album

Studio album by Cory Chisel and The Wandering Sons
- Released: June 26, 2012
- Genre: Indie rock, folk rock
- Length: 29:30
- Label: Ready Made Records

Cory Chisel and The Wandering Sons chronology
Death Won't Send A Letter (2009)	Old Believers (2012)

Singles from Old Believers
- 1. "Never Meant To Love You" Released: June 26, 2012

Old Believers is the 2012 album release by Cory Chisel and The Wandering Sons.

== Track listing ==
No.	Title	Length
1.	"This is How It Goes"	1:25
2.	"I've Been Accused"	2:41
3.	"Old Love"	3:21
4.	"Never Meant To Love You"	3:47
5.	"Please Tell Me"	3:07
6.	"Laura"	2:44
7.	"Foxgloves"	3:48
8.	"She Don't Mind"	3:25
9.	"Times Won't Change"	2:44
10.	"Seventeen"	2:47
11.	"Over Jordan"	4:01
12.	"Wood Drake"	5:30

== Charts ==
Chart (2012)	Peak position
Belgian Albums (Ultratop Flanders)	155
US Americana/Folk Albums (Billboard)	11
US Heatseekers Albums (Billboard)	10
US Independent Albums (Billboard)	49
