= Cory Chisel =

American musician (born 1981)

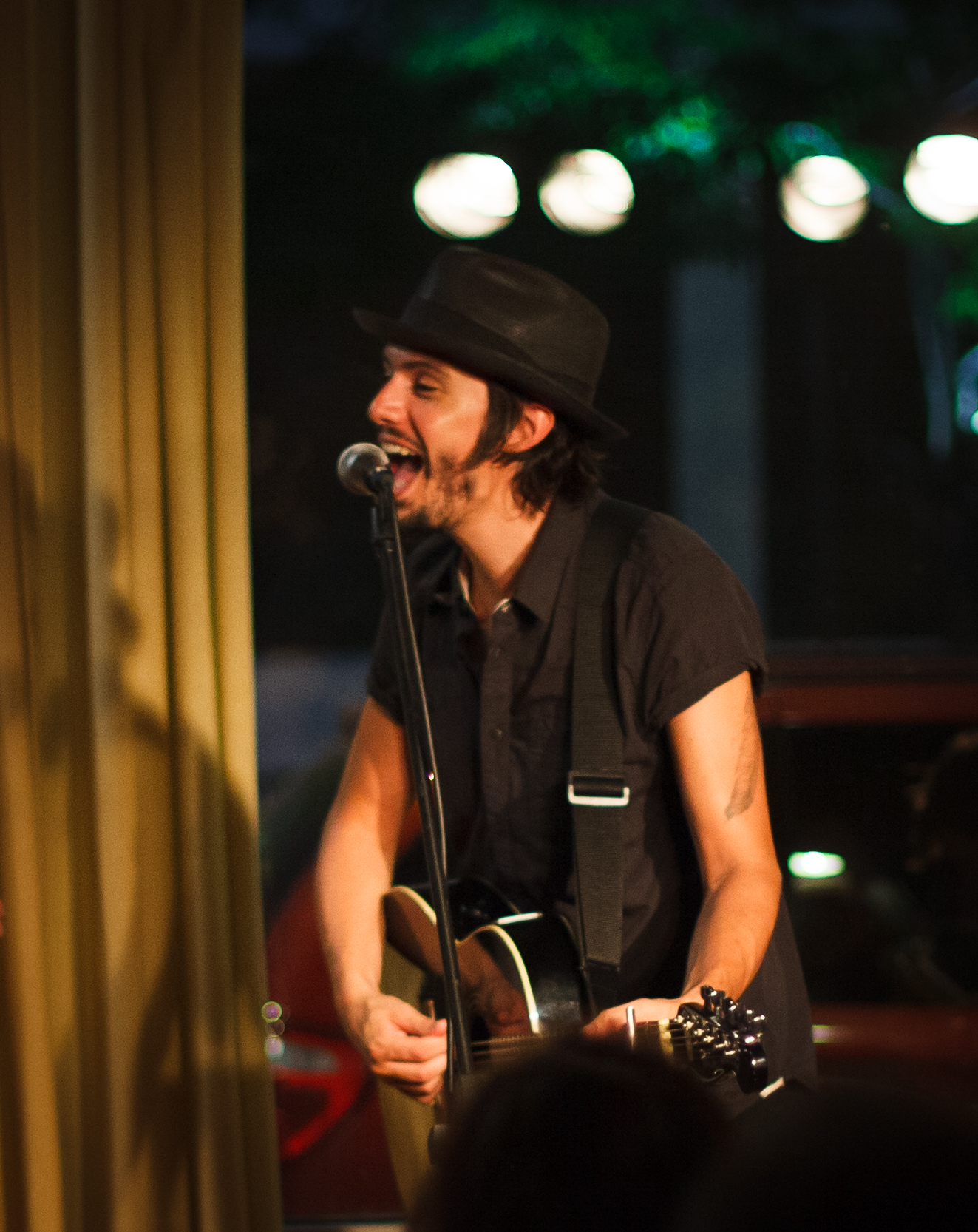
- Chisel performing in July 2012

Background information
- Born: December 1, 1981 (age 44); Babbitt, Minnesota, U.S.
- Genres: Americana; folk; rock
- Occupations: Singer; songwriter; musician
- Instruments: Vocals; guitar
- Years active: 2004–present
- Label: RCA

Cory Chisel (born December 1, 1981) is an American singer, songwriter, and musician. Chisel was nominated for the 2016 Grammy Award for Best American Roots Song for writing "The Traveling Kind" with Emmylou Harris and Rodney Crowell.

Chisel has released seven records of his Americana and folk rock songs: six records as Cory Chisel and The Wandering Sons, and one as Cory Chisel and Adriel Denae. Chisel has collaborated on songs and albums with Norah Jones, Rosanne Cash, Rodney Crowell, Emmylou Harris, William Bell, Brendan Benson, and Preservation Hall Jazz Band. In 2016, Rosanne Cash said of Chisel, "He's got one of the great blue-eyed soul voices in the world right now, I think."

== Early life ==
Chisel was born on December 1, 1981. His family moved to Appleton, Wisconsin when he was 7 years old, but he spent his early life and many of his summers in Babbitt and neighboring Ely, Minnesota, where, together, both sides of his family originate. His earliest introduction to music and performance was singing hymns in church as a child, where his father was a Baptist minister and his mother played the piano and organ. Chisel has said that his musical pursuits have often been an attempt to re-create the same euphoria he felt at a young age, when he would be completely taken over by the beautiful rhythms, sounds and stories he experienced in church.

Chisel's extended family was also an early musical influence, and he first gained fluency in music playing and singing with his family. He grew up in a strict and religious household where he was not allowed to listen to pop music on the radio or watch MTV, but the influence of his uncle Roger, a talented blues musician whose record collection included Howlin' Wolf, Bob Dylan, Aretha Franklin, Sam Cooke, Otis Redding, Robert Johnson, Johnny Cash, and Tom Waits, provided his first exposure to secular music, and fueled his aspirations as a young musician and songwriter. Chisel sensed that he had much in common with his uncle, in that music could become an important means of expression for himself as well.

By the age of 12, Chisel had learned to play guitar, and began producing rap beats with his childhood friend Andy B. a.k.a White Chocolate, and in 1997, at 15, he formed the band Breathing Machine, with which he played live and released four albums of original music between 1998 and 2002. In 2004, he gave the band a stylistic overhaul and renamed it The Wandering Sons.

== Career ==
=== Breakthrough with The Wandering Sons (2004–2006) ===
Chisel, with his band Cory Chisel and The Wandering Sons, released their debut album Again From the Beginning in 2004, followed by Darken Your Door (EP) in 2005. During that time, Chisel continued building a strong following for his music in his hometown of Appleton, Wisconsin, allowing him to earn a living as an independent musician. The turning point in his career towards wider exposure came in 2006 with the self-released album Little Bird, which garnered the attention of major record labels and led to a showcase in Los Angeles, with the band subsequently signing a deal with the RCA Records imprint Black Seal.

=== Releases on RCA: Cabin Ghosts and Death Won't Send A Letter (2007–2011) ===
Under the RCA Records label, Chisel released Cabin Ghosts (EP) in 2008 and Death Won't Send A Letter in 2009. Cabin Ghosts was recorded at his family's cabin in northern Wisconsin and at a live concert in Appleton, Wisconsin. Death Won't Send A Letter was recorded at Sunset Sound in Los Angeles and Blackbird Studio in Nashville, and produced by Joe Chiccarelli, with Brendan Benson and Jack Lawrence of The Raconteurs also contributing to the album.

Tours and performances in support of Cabin Ghosts and Death Won't Send A Letter included a tour with Josh Ritter, performances on "Late Night with Jimmy Fallon" in 2009, at The Newport Folk Festival and Glastonbury Festival in 2010, and at Bonnaroo Music Festival in 2011.

In 2008, Chisel was featured in a national ad campaign for Lucky Brand jeans that featured young artists, athletes, and entrepreneurs, which appeared in Vogue, Vanity Fair, W Magazine, on billboards and in Lucky Brand stores.

=== Move to Nashville: Old Believers (2012–2015) ===
While Death Won't Send A Letter garnered strong reviews and Chisel was developing a growing following through touring, RCA soon shuttered Black Seal, and Chisel found himself without a label. In 2011, he relocated to Nashville, where he began spending time with friend and fellow songwriter Brendan Benson. Old Believers was recorded at the all-analog studio Welcome to 1979 studio in Nashville, produced by Benson, and released in 2012 on Benson's independent label Readymade Records.

In 2012, Chisel toured in support of Norah Jones, and also performed on "Conan" and "The Late Show with David Letterman." In 2013 he performed at the Library of Congress with Rosanne Cash at her 3-day residency.

=== The Refuge and Tell Me True (2015–2024) ===
In 2015, Chisel moved back to his hometown of Appleton, Wisconsin into an 80-year-old former Franciscan Monastery on 10 acres of wooded land along the Fox River. In 2016, in that space, which he named The Refuge, Chisel co-founded Refuge Foundation for the Arts, a nonprofit which provided support, space, and collaborative opportunities for emerging musicians and visual artists. In the recording studio they built inside The Refuge, Chisel and Denae recorded Tell Me True, released in 2017, under the name Cory Chisel and Adriel Denae.

Between 2015 and 2018, Chisel recorded and toured with Jonny Fritz and Robert Ellis as part of the Americana trio Traveller. They made their live debut at Newport Folk Festival in 2015, and in 2018 their album Western Movies was recorded at The Refuge and released by Refuge Foundation for the Arts.

Chisel co-wrote three tracks of Adriel Denae's self-titled debut album, produced by Norah Jones, also released in 2018 by Refuge Foundation for the Arts.

Chisel co-wrote the song "The House Always Wins" on the 2016 William Bell album This Is Where I Live, which won the 2017 Grammy Award for Best Americana Album.

== Artistry ==
Chisel has described the songwriting process as something that feels like gaining access to an indefinable, almost spiritual force, which becomes possible when a person is in a heightened state, a phenomenon he remembers first witnessing during his childhood, when his father would sometimes reach a sort of hypnosis as he concluded a passionate sermon.

Chisel has shared how living in Wisconsin and northern Minnesota has influenced his songwriting, in that the slower pace of life, and the dark and colder weather, aids in the introspection needed for songwriting. He has also noted that people that live in some small towns in the Midwest seem to be choosing to exile themselves to create a unique society that works for them, a concept he has worked on over a long period of time in his songwriting.

== Other ventures ==
In 2013, Chisel was a part of the team that launched Mile of Music, a free 4-day music festival held annually in August in Appleton, Wisconsin. Its first year featured performances by Rodney Crowell, Justin Townes Earle and Norah Jones. In 2025, the festival was attended by 90,000 people, and 200 artists put on approximately 700 shows.

Beginning in 2019, Chisel has co-taught courses on composing American Roots Music at Lawrence University Conservatory of Music in Appleton, Wisconsin. Chisel composed the theme music for the Lionsgate film Desperation Road, released in 2023, based on a novel by Michael Farris Smith and starring Mel Gibson.

In 2020, Chisel acted in and produced a pilot for an anthology television series starring Rachael Leigh Cook, filmed at The Refuge.

== Awards ==
Chisel was named Artist of the Year at the 2010 Wisconsin Area Music Industry awards. The song "Born Again" was awarded Song of the Year and Death Won't Send a Letter was named Record of the Year.

Chisel received a collaboration award for Mile of Music from Lawrence University in 2015.

== The Wandering Sons ==
Chisel has recorded and played live during his career with a varying cast of supporting musicians, and since 2004 this group has been known as The Wandering Sons. These musicians have included:

- Adriel Denae – vocals and organ
- Daniel McMahon – guitar
- Miles Nielsen – bass
- Daxx Nielsen – drums
- Noah Harris – guitar and piano
- Samuel James Farrell – guitar
- Alex Drossart – keyboard

== Discography ==
=== Studio albums ===
- Again From The Beginning (2004)
- Darken Your Door (2005)
- Little Bird (2006)
- Cabin Ghosts (2008)
- Death Won't Send A Letter (2009)
- Old Believers (2012)
- Tell Me True (2017)

=== Singles ===
- "Take The Light" (2026)

=== Collaborative studio albums ===
- Western Movies (2018) as a member of Traveller
- Deep Sleep (feat. Cory Chisel) (2022) with Twelve'len

=== Other appearances ===
- "Some Cold Rainy Day" on the Preservation Hall Jazz Band album An Album to Benefit Preservation Hall (2010)
- "Fixing a Hole" on the compilation Minnesota Beatle Project Vol. 2 (2010)
- "50,000 Watts" on the Rosanne Cash album The River & the Thread (2014)
- "You Can't Say We Didn't Try" on the Emmylou Harris & Rodney Crowell album The Traveling Kind (2015)
- "The Traveling Kind" on the Emmylou Harris & Rodney Crowell album The Traveling Kind (2015)
- "Bring It on Home to Me" on the Mason Jar Music compilation Decoration Day, Vol.4 (2015)
- "The House Always Wins" on the William Bell album This Is Where I Live (2016)
- "Ebony Eyes" on the compilation A Tribute to John D. Loudermilk (2017)
- "New Light" on the compilation Wisconsin Vinyl Collective, Vol. 1 (2017)
- "Storm Warming" on the Rodney Crowell album Close Ties (2017)
- "Wicked Game" on the Rodney Crowell compilation Songs From Quarantine Vol. 2 (2021)
- "Aftermath" on the Jedd Hughes album Nightshades (2025)
