= Magnetic South (album) =

Studio album by Michael Nesmith & The First National Band
- Released: June 1970
- Recorded: February–March 1970
- Studios: RCA Studios, Hollywood
- Genres: Country rock; progressive country
- Length: 33:24
- Label: RCA Victor
- Producer: Felton Jarvis

Michael Nesmith & The First National Band chronology
The Wichita Train Whistle Sings (1968)	Magnetic South (1970)	Loose Salute (1970)

Magnetic South is the first solo album by American singer-songwriter Michael Nesmith during his post-Monkees career. Released by RCA Records in 1970, the album peaked at Number 143 on the Billboard Pop Albums charts and Number 49 in Canada. Magnetic South is considered a pioneering example of country rock. "Joanne" backed with "One Rose" was issued as a single from the album, reaching Number 21 on the Billboard singles charts and Number 6 on the Adult Contemporary charts, #5 on the Australian chart, and #4 in Canada. "Joanne" was the highest charting single of Nesmith's entire solo career.

== History ==
Nesmith formed the backing group "The First National Band" and gave them billing on both the cover and label of the record. Band member John London had previously played bass on several Monkees tracks and appeared as an extra on several episodes of the TV show, while Red Rhodes had played on a few 1969 Monkees tracks, notably "Steam Engine."

Five of the album's eleven tracks are from Nesmith's career with The Monkees. The first four tracks were recorded in 1968-69 for the Monkees. Before Nesmith recorded "Hollywood" in 1968, he recorded a demo of the song for possible inclusion on the Monkees 1967 album Headquarters. Although Nesmith was attempting to distance himself from the Monkees during this time, he did dedicate the album to Bert Schneider, David, Micky, and Peter (as well as to Lester Sill). Nesmith would not allude to or mention the Monkees by name again publicly until The Michael Nesmith Radio Special, broadcast in 1979.

RCA Victor producer Felton Jarvis was given production credit on Magnetic South even though he did no actual production work — Nesmith gave Jarvis the credit primarily as a thanks for helping sign Nesmith and the First National Band to RCA Records. Jarvis was also the only person ever listed as producer of a Michael Nesmith album, other than Nesmith himself.

Magnetic South was reissued in 1999 as 16 Original Classics with five bonus tracks. It was also reissued with Loose Salute (both remastered) on CD by RCA/BMG International in 2000. The album (without bonus tracks), along with Nesmith's next four RCA Victor albums, was included in the five CD slipcase set Original Album Classics issued in 2015 by RCA/Sony Music/Legacy.

== Reception ==
Professional ratings
Review scores
Source	Rating
AllMusic	4.5/5 stars
Christgau's Record Guide	B
Q	4/5 stars

Although Magnetic South was only a moderate commercial success, the album was well-received critically and helped Nesmith to shed his image as a member of the Monkees. During one of Nesmith's early gigs with the First National Band, they played alongside Gram Parsons and the brand new Flying Burrito Brothers. Nesmith recalls how a former Monkee decked out in a Nudie suit with a steel player in tow must have been laughable to Parsons and other seasoned Country devotees. However, their unique sound was enough to win over the LA club scene and create a new image for Nesmith.

Allmusic stated in their review "Mixing a country sound with a rocker's instincts and blending airy thoughts on the nature of life and love with iconography of life in the West that brought together the old and the new, Michael Nesmith reveled in contradictions on Magnetic South, making them sound as comfortable as well-worn cowboy boots and as fun as a Saturday night barn dance. It's a minor masterpiece of country-rock, and while the Eagles may have sold more records, Nesmith yodels a hell of a lot better than any of them."

== Track listing ==
All songs by Michael Nesmith except where noted:

1. "Calico Girlfriend" – 2:37
2. "Nine Times Blue" – 1:39
3. "Little Red Rider" – 2:34
4. "The Crippled Lion" – 3:10
5. "Joanne" – 3:10
6. "First National Rag" (Red Rhodes) – 0:21
7. "Mama Nantucket" – 2:36
8. "Keys to the Car" – 2:52
9. "Hollywood" – 5:03
10. "One Rose" (Del Lyon, Lani McIntyre) – 3:27
11. "Beyond the Blue Horizon" (Richard A. Whiting, W. Franke Harling, Leo Robin) – 5:55

Bonus tracks on 16 Original Classics re-release

12. "Silver Moon" – 3:11
13. "Lady of the Valley" – 2:57
14. "Here I Am" – 3:19
15. "Nevada Fighter" – 3:08
16. "Tumbling Tumbleweeds" (Bob Nolan) – 3:49

== Personnel ==
- Michael Nesmith – vocals, guitar
- Red Rhodes – pedal steel guitar
- John Ware – drums
- John London – bass

with:

- Earl P. Ball – side piano
- Glen Hardin – piano, keyboards, tracks 12–16
