= Hard Bargain (Emmylou Harris album) =

Studio album by Emmylou Harris
- Released: April 26, 2011
- Recorded: August 2010
- Genres: Country folk, Americana
- Length: 53:04
- Label: Nonesuch
- Producer: Jay Joyce

Emmylou Harris chronology
All I Intended to Be (2008)	Hard Bargain (2011)	Old Yellow Moon (2013)

Professional ratings
Aggregate scores
Source	Rating
Metacritic	69/100
Review scores
Source	Rating
AllMusic	4/5 stars
Billboard	(9/10)
Entertainment Weekly	B+
The Guardian	3/5 stars
The Independent	3/5 stars
Los Angeles Times	2.5/4 stars
New Zealand Herald	4/5 stars
Paste Magazine	(8/10)
PopMatters	(8/10)
Slant Magazine	3.5/5 stars

Hard Bargain is the twenty-sixth studio album by American country music singer-songwriter Emmylou Harris, released on April 26, 2011, and recorded at Tragedy/Tragedy, TN. The album is her fourth solo recording for Nonesuch Records.

With 17,000 copies sold in its first week, the album debuted at number three on the U.S. Billboard Top Country Albums, Harris' highest entry since her bluegrass LP Roses in the Snow in 1980. At the same time it debuted at number 18 on the Billboard 200, displacing 1977's Luxury Liner as her most successful solo LP ever on that chart.

== Album information ==
The songs which were to become the "Hard Bargain" album were, according to Emmylou, recorded within four weeks in August 2010. Only three people can be heard on the album, namely Harris herself, producer Jay Joyce, and Giles Reaves. In December 2010, six video clips were filmed at Laughing House Studios, Nashville, TN, directed by Jack Spencer. These videos, with additional commentary, can be found on the bonus DVD of the album's deluxe release.

The opening number "The Road" is about the late Gram Parsons, her musical mentor who died in 1973 and is the first Harris-penned song to directly focus on his death since "Boulder to Birmingham", a track from her 1975 release Pieces of the Sky.

"My Name Is Emmett Till" tells the story of Emmett Till, an African-American boy who was killed in 1955.

"Darlin' Kate" is a tribute to the late Kate McGarrigle who died of cancer in 2010. Kate, and her sister Anna McGarrigle, collaborated with Harris on numerous occasions since the 1970s.

"New Orleans" makes references to Hurricane Katrina, which ravaged the city in 2005.

== Critical reception ==
Hard Bargain was met with "generally favorable" reviews from critics. At Metacritic, which assigns a weighted average rating out of 100 to reviews from mainstream publications, this release received an average score of 69, based on 19 reviews.

== Track listing ==
All tracks written by Emmylou Harris, except where noted.

No.	Title	Writer(s)	Length
1.	"The Road"		5:31
2.	"Home Sweet Home"		3:45
3.	"My Name Is Emmett Till"		4:53
4.	"Goodnight Old World"	Harris, Will Jennings	3:55
5.	"New Orleans"	Harris, Jennings	3:38
6.	"Big Black Dog"		3:26
7.	"Lonely Girl"		4:44
8.	"Hard Bargain"	Ron Sexsmith	3:23
9.	"Six White Cadillacs"	Harris, Jennings	3:22
10.	"The Ship on His Arm"		4:46
11.	"Darlin' Kate"		3:08
12.	"Nobody"		5:04
13.	"Cross Yourself"	Jay Joyce	3:36

iTunes/digital bonus track
No.	Title	Writer(s)	Length
14.	"To Ohio" (with The Low Anthem)	Ben Knox Miller, Jeffrey Prystowsky	3:27

Deluxe edition with bonus DVD
No.	Title	Length
1.	"Six White Cadillacs" (video)
2.	"Goodnight Old World" (video)
3.	"Home Sweet Home" (video)
4.	"Darlin' Kate" (video)
5.	"Big Black Dog" (video)
6.	"The Road" (Acoustic Version) (video)

== Personnel ==
- Emmylou Harris – vocals, acoustic guitar
- Jay Joyce – guitar, bass guitar, keyboards, piano, omnichord, ganjo, mandolin
- Giles Reaves – drums, keyboards, percussion, piano, organ, vibraphone, marimbula

== Charts ==
Chart performance for Hard Bargain
Chart (2011)	Peak position
Australian Albums (ARIA)	48
Belgian Albums (Ultratop Flanders)	39
Belgian Albums (Ultratop Wallonia)	85
Canadian Albums (Billboard)	19
Danish Albums (Hitlisten)	27
Dutch Albums (Album Top 100)	15
German Albums (Offizielle Top 100)	49
Irish Albums (IRMA)	36
New Zealand Albums (RMNZ)	28
Norwegian Albums (VG-lista)	11
Scottish Albums (Official Charts)	19
Swedish Albums (Sverigetopplistan)	15
Swiss Albums (Schweizer Hitparade)	76
UK Albums (Official Charts)	30
UK Country Albums (Official Charts)	2
US Billboard 200	18
US Top Album Sales (Billboard)	18
US Top Country Albums (Billboard)	3
US Americana/Folk Albums (Billboard)	3
US Top Rock Albums (Billboard)	6
US Indie Store Album Sales (Billboard)	5

== Release history ==
Release history and formats for Hard Bargain
Region	Date	Format	Label	Ref.
North America	April 26, 2011	CD; music download	Nonesuch Records	
