= Cabin Ghosts =

- Artwork for the 2008 EP

EP by Cory Chisel and The Wandering Sons
- Released: July 15, 2008
- Genre: Alternative rock, indie rock, folk rock
- Length: 18:56
- Label: RCA

Cory Chisel and The Wandering Sons chronology
Little Bird (2006)	Cabin Ghosts (2008)	Death Won't Send A Letter (2009)

Cabin Ghosts is the 2008 EP by Cory Chisel and The Wandering Sons. It was recorded mostly live at Robinwood, his family's cabin in Elcho, Wisconsin, and at a live concert in his hometown of Appleton, Wisconsin.

== Track listing ==
No.	Title	Length
1.	"Lovers and Friends"	2:34
2.	"See It My Way"	3:39
3.	"So Wrong For Me"	2:43
4.	"On My Side"	3:08
5.	"It Won't Be Long"	2:55
6.	"Home in the Woods"	3:57
