= Miles Nielsen =

American singer-songwriter (born 1975)

Background information
- Born: Miles Spence Nielsen; July 20, 1975 (age 51); Rockford, Illinois, U.S.A.
- Genres: Rock, power pop, soul, jam, "Beatlesque-Cosmic-Americana"
- Occupations: Musician, singer, songwriter
- Instruments: Guitar, bass guitar, vocals
- Years active: 1990–present
- Label: Rowtown Records
- Member of: Miles Nielsen & The Rusted Hearts, The Nielsen Trust
- Spouse: Kelly Steward
- Website: milesnielsen.com, thenielsentrust.com

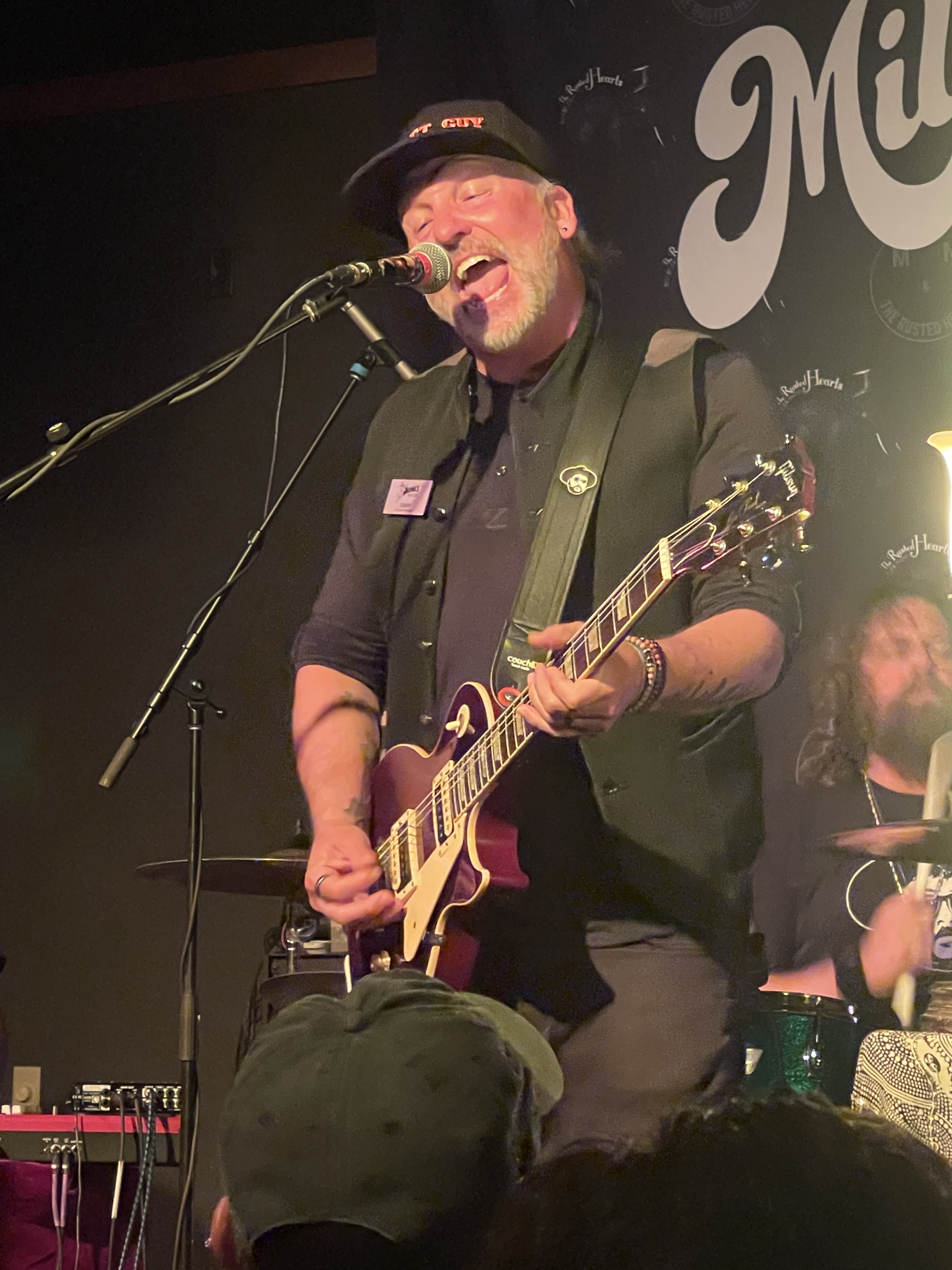
Miles Nielsen performs at Monk's Bar & Grill in Lake Delton, Wisconsin during the Stampede Music Festival, April 12, 2025.

Miles Spence Nielsen (born July 20, 1975) is an American musician, singer, and songwriter based in Rockford, Illinois, U.S.A. He is a member of the rock band The Nielsen Trust as well as the front man and titular founder of the rock group Miles Nielsen & The Rusted Hearts.

== 1997–2004 ==
=== Harmony Riley ===
From 1997 to 2004 Nielsen was a member of the rock group Harmony Riley. The band took their name from Riley Harmony Road which crosses Interstate 90 near the town of Marengo, IL.

Harmony Riley Discography:
Year	Title
1999	Time
2000	Four Songs
2002	Harmony Riley – Volume 1

=== Harmony Riley members ===
- Miles Nielsen – guitar, vocals
- Daxx Nielsen – piano, drums, percussion, backing vocals
- Kevin Buck – backing vocals, guitar
- Matt Makris – bass, vocals

== 1999–2001 ==
=== Silver ===
On August 28, 1999 the rock band Cheap Trick celebrated their 25th anniversary with a concert at Davis Park in Rockford, Illinois. This performance would eventually be released on compact disc on February 27, 2001, and later on DVD (October 9, 2001) under the title, "Cheap Trick – Silver." Miles Nielsen joined Cheap Trick during this anniversary performance for the song "Losing You" by John Lennon; a song that his father, Rick Nielsen, recorded with Lennon himself on August 12, 1980 during the Double Fantasy sessions, just months before the former Beatle was tragically murdered by Mark David Chapman. In addition, Miles Nielsen played acoustic guitar during the Silver performance for the Robin Zander penned song "Time Will Let You Know."

== 2004 ==
=== Judgement Day – The Songs of Robert Johnson ===
In 2004 Miles Nielsen appeared on the album "Judgement Day – The Songs of Robert Johnson." Nielsen's contribution to the album is a rendition of the legendary bluesman's 1937 composition "Hellhound on My Trail."

== 2006 – 2008 ==
=== Cory Chisel and The Wandering Sons ===
From 2006 to 2008 Miles Nielsen was a member of Cory Chisel and The Wandering Sons. Nielsen played bass guitar on the albums "Little Bird" (2006) and "Cabin Ghosts" (2008).

== 2009 ==
=== Miles ===
In 2009 Nielsen collaborated with musicians Daniel McMahon, Darren Garvey, Adam Plamann, Jim Westin, Andy Scarpaci, Kelly Steward and others to produce an album of twelve self-penned tracks. Titled simply "Miles," the self-released album was engineered and produced by both Miles Nielsen and Daniel McMahon. Other musicians contributing to this album include Bun. E. Carlos and Daxx Nielsen.

=== Miles Nielsen bonus tracks ===
"Miles Nielsen Bonus Tracks" was a CDr formatted EP self-released in March 2009. Included on the disc are the tracks "Walk Straight," "Good Heart Sway (Fast)," "Strangers," "Slo" and "Silver Spoon (Demo)." This collection of songs was intended to be a bonus disc for those who purchased the compact disc "Miles,"(released in 2009) and was made available at Kool Kat Music's website.

== 2011–present ==
=== Miles Nielsen and The Rusted Hearts ===
Formed in 2011, Miles Nielsen & The Rusted Hearts has been Nielsen's primary musical endeavor. Since its inception, Miles Nielsen & The Rusted Hearts have toured and performed continuously throughout the United States, much of western Europe, and in Puerto Peñasco, Sonora, Mexico at the Circus Mexicus music festival.

=== Miles Nielsen and the Rusted Hearts current members ===
- Miles Nielsen – guitar, vocals
- Kelly Steward – guitar, vocals
- Jim Westin – keyboards
- Jeff Werckle – drums, percussion, sampler
- Adam Plamann – keyboards, woodwinds, backing vocals
- Dave McClellan – bass guitar, backing vocals, Spanish language vocals

=== Miles Nielsen and The Rusted Hearts member changes ===
Dave McClellan replaced original bassist Andy Scarpaci in February 2012. In January 2013 Jeff Werckle joined The Rusted Hearts as the group's drummer, replacing Darren Garvey. Guitarist Daniel James McMahon passed away on September 19, 2024, leading to keyboardist Jim Westin and singer-songwriter Kelly Steward joining the band shortly thereafter. Kelly Steward is Miles Nielsen's wife. Jim Westin contributed keyboards to Nielsen's 2009 effort, "Miles" and is the keyboardist for Kelly Steward & The Restless Kind.

=== Miles Nielsen and the Rusted Hearts past members ===
- Daniel McMahon – guitar, accordion, backing vocals
- Andy Scarpaci – bass guitar, backing vocals
- Darren Garvey – drums

=== Discography ===
To date, Miles Nielsen & The Rusted Hearts have released four LPs (including a live album), two EPs, and numerous singles.

Miles Nielsen & The Rusted Hearts discography
Year	Title
2011	Miles Nielsen Presents The Rusted Hearts
2012	St. Louis Sessions (4 song EP)
2014	Rockford
2016	Heavy Metal
2016	Audio Tree Live (6 song EP)
2019	Ohbahoy
2019	In the Meantime (4 song EP)

Singles
Year	Title
2016	High Street
2016	Heavy Metal
2017	Revolution Day
2020	Joke
2020	Letters and Hammers
2025	Build a Fire (written by Kevn Kinney)
2025	Bullies
2025	Waiting on the Rain

=== Daniel McMahon (1982–2024) ===
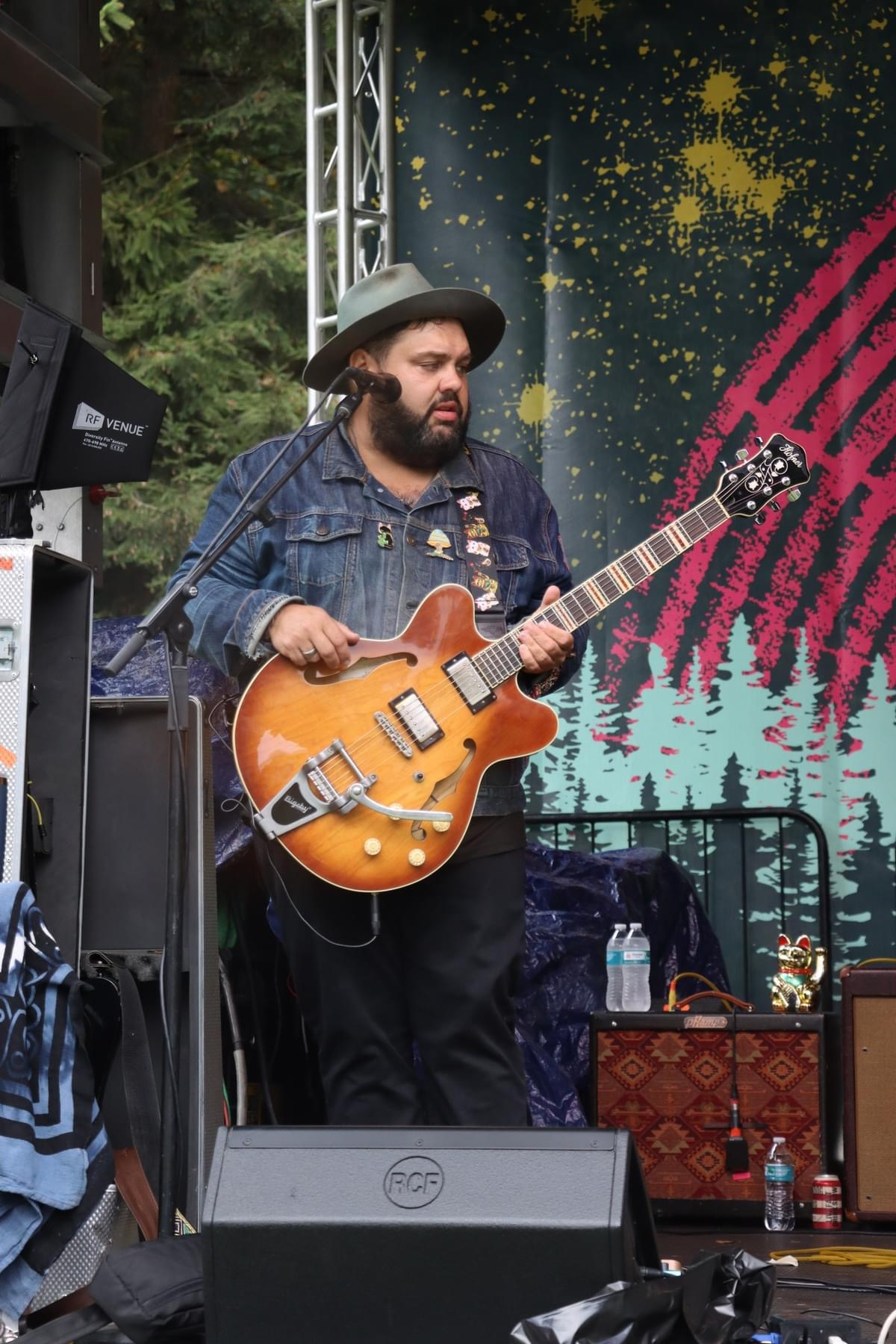
Guitarist Daniel James McMahon performing with Miles Nielsen & The Rusted Hearts.

On September 19, 2024 Nielsen's fellow collaborator, guitarist and co-founding member of The Rusted Hearts, Daniel James McMahon died at the age of 41 due to cancer.

In an August 22, 2024 interview with The Cedar Rapids Gazette, Nielsen was quoted as saying, "That’s been a real huge curveball for us, since I’ve been making music with Dan for 18 years...We’re missing a huge piece of our puzzle. We’ve just been trying to keep the train on the tracks and not do him a disservice." McMahon was on hiatus from the band at the time due to receiving treatment for esophageal cancer.

A celebration of life was held for McMahon on November 24, 2024 at the Coronado Theater in downtown Rockford, IL. During the ceremony, keyboardist Jim Westin and Nielsen's wife, singer-songwriter Kelly Steward, joined Nielsen and The Rusted Hearts on stage to perform McMahon's original composition "I Make Mistakes." The late musician released the song on July 25, 2024, less than two months prior to his passing. Steward and Westin had been performing with the band during McMahon's convalescence and would ultimately go on to fill the void created by McMahon's death by becoming permanent members of The Rusted Hearts.

McMahon was a close companion to Nielsen as well as a trusted creative partner. He was a central creative figure for The Rusted Hearts, and his talents contributed greatly to nearly all aspects of the group's arrangements, recordings and trademark sound. McMahon's loss was enormously impactful to Nielsen, his bandmates, and the greater Rockford community at large.

== 2012 ==
=== Academy Award for "Undefeated" ===
In 2012 the documentary film "Undefeated," which featured original music scored and performed by Miles Nielsen and fellow Rusted Hearts guitarist Daniel McMahon, was awarded an Academy Award for "Best Documentary Feature." The soundtrack for the movie was released on February 17, 2012, with eleven of its seventeen tracks composed and performed by Miles Nielsen and Daniel McMahon.

== 2016 ==
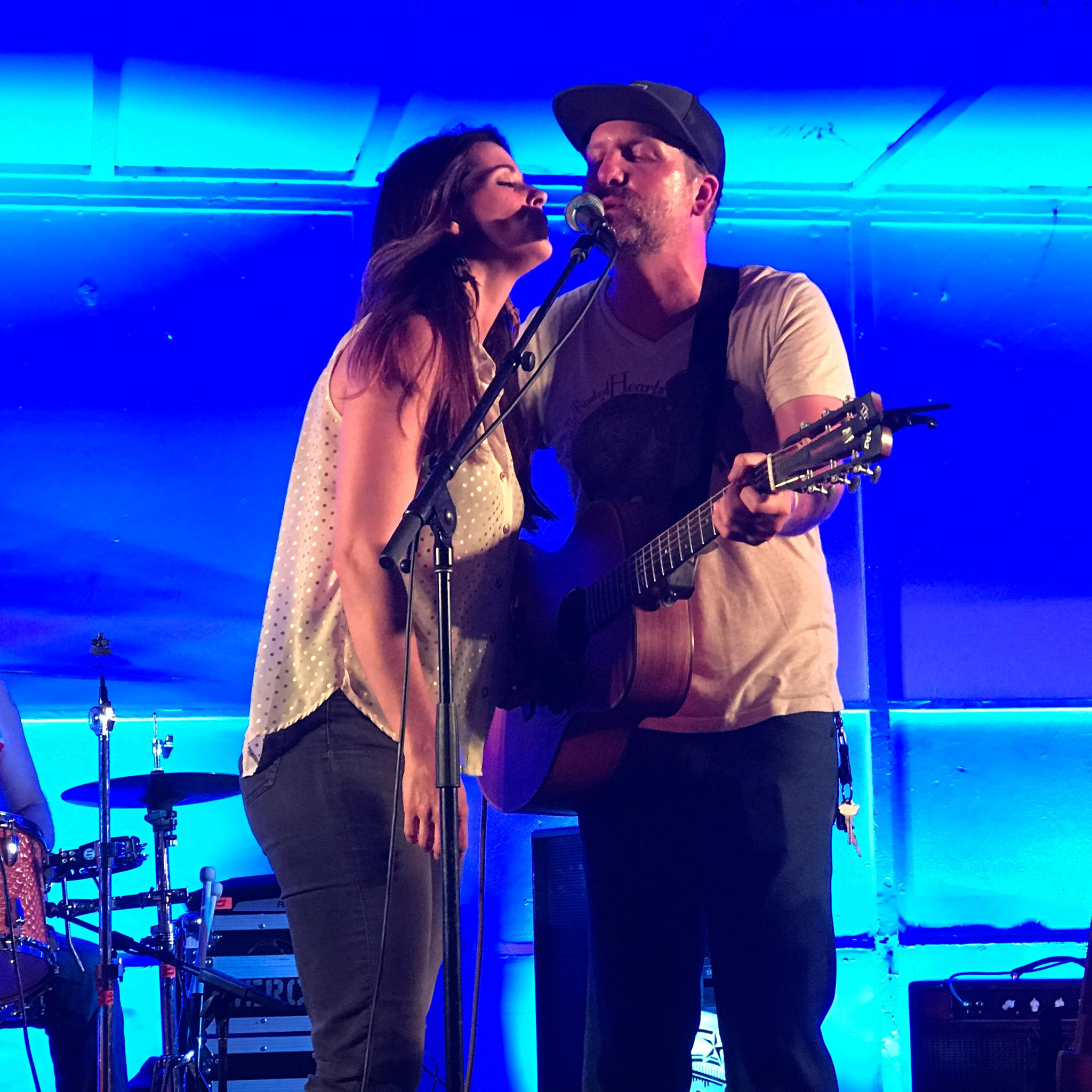
Miles Nielsen & Kelly Steward performing in Rockford, IL, July 4, 2017.

=== Weep and Willow ===
Miles Nielsen and his wife, Kelly Steward, released a four-song EP titled "Weep & Willow" in 2016. The couple frequently duet on stage performing songs from this release.

== 2019–present ==
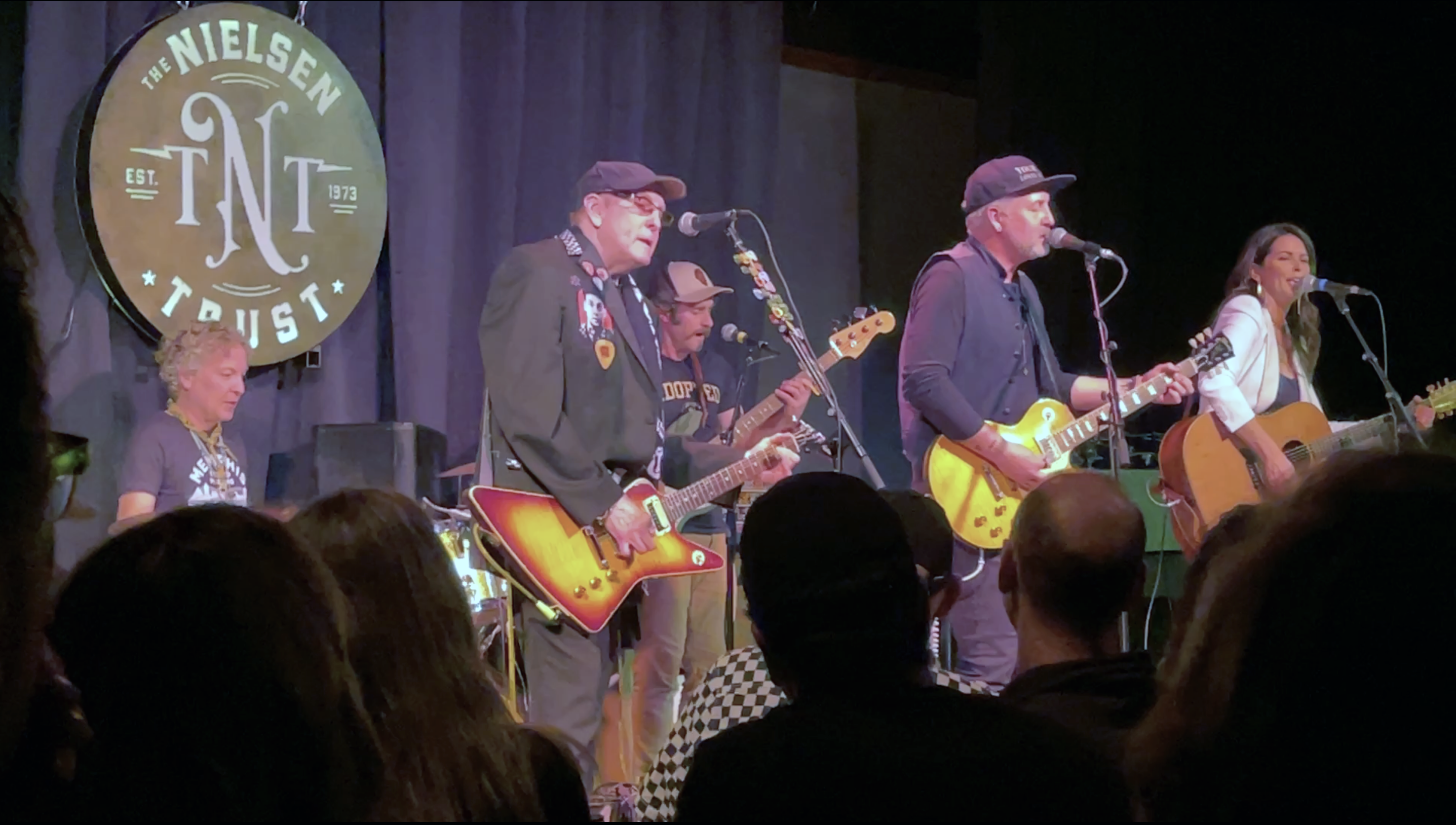
The Nielsen Trust performing in Lake Delton, Wisconsin.

=== The Nielsen Trust ===
Miles Nielsen is a member of the rock group The Nielsen Trust. Formed in 2019 and billed as a family band, its members include Nielsen's father, Rick Nielsen; his brother, Daxx Nielsen; and his wife, Kelly Steward. The band was formed at the suggestion of Nielsen's mother, Karen Nielsen. Rick Nielsen and Daxx Nielsen are both members of the rock band Cheap Trick. Rounding out the rest of the line up are fellow Rusted Hearts bandmates Dave McClellan (bass guitar) and Adam Plamann (keyboards, clarinet & saxophone).

On November 9, 2025 Jason Narducy announced in a Threads social media post that he would be replacing Dave McClellan on bass guitar for three mid-December 2025 performances by The Nielsen Trust.

=== _{Members of The Nielsen Trust:} ===
Miles Nielsen – guitar, vocals

Rick Nielsen – guitar

Daxx Nielsen – drums

Kelly Steward – guitar, vocals

Dave McClellan – bass guitar, backing vocals

Adam Plamann – keyboards, woodwinds, backing vocals
