= Loose Salute =

Studio album by Michael Nesmith & The First National Band
- Released: November 1970
- Recorded: April–October 1970
- Genres: Country rock; progressive country; country folk
- Length: 31:16
- Label: RCA Victor
- Producer: Michael Nesmith

Michael Nesmith & The First National Band chronology
Magnetic South (1970)	Loose Salute (1970)	Nevada Fighter (1971)

Loose Salute is the second solo album by American singer-songwriter Michael Nesmith released during his post-Monkees career. Issued by RCA Records in 1970 and dedicated to Tony Richland, it peaked at No. 159 on the Billboard Pop Albums charts.

== History ==
"Listen to the Band" featured on the album, is the song's third version; previous versions appeared on 33⅓ Revolutions per Monkee (featuring The Monkees' final performance of the 1960s with Peter Tork) and as a mid-1969 single by The Monkees. Nesmith also re-recorded his (then) unreleased Monkees song, "Carlisle Wheeling". However, for Loose Salute, he changed the title of the song to "Conversations".

The album featured a quasi-instrumental number, "First National Dance," which was recorded for the album but at the last minute replaced by "Silver Moon", which was issued as a single in Australia and did quite well there, reaching #14 on the charts. A cover of Jerry Reed's song "Guitar Man" was recorded but did not appear on the album. When the album was reissued in 2000 on CD coupled with Magnetic South by RCA/BMG International, "First National Dance" was included in this release.

The track, "Bye, Bye, Bye" went through eleven recording and mixing sessions before Nesmith was satisfied with the results; this delayed release of the album.

== Reception ==
Professional ratings
Review scores
Source	Rating
Allmusic	4/5 stars
Christgau's Record Guide	B+
The Village Voice	B

Allmusic stated in their review "Loose Salute doesn't cohere quite as well as Magnetic South, but the material is strong, the band sounds great, and Michael Nesmith offered even more surprises than he had in his first turn at bat; it's one of the strongest records in his catalog as a solo artist."

== Track listing ==
All songs by Michael Nesmith except where noted.

1. "Silver Moon" – 3:15
2. "I Fall to Pieces" (Harlan Howard, Hank Cochran) – 2:56
3. "Thanx for the Ride" – 2:48
4. "Dedicated Friend" – 2:27
5. "Conversations" – 3:27
6. "Tengo Amore" – 3:00
7. "Listen to the Band" – 2:35
8. "Bye, Bye, Bye" – 3:17
9. "Lady of the Valley" – 2:57
10. "Hello Lady" – 3:49

== Personnel ==
- Michael Nesmith – vocals & rhythm guitar
- John London – bass
- John Ware – drums
- Red Rhodes – pedal steel guitar

with:

- Glen Hardin – piano
