= Jonathan Edwards (musician) =

American singer-songwriter (born 1946)

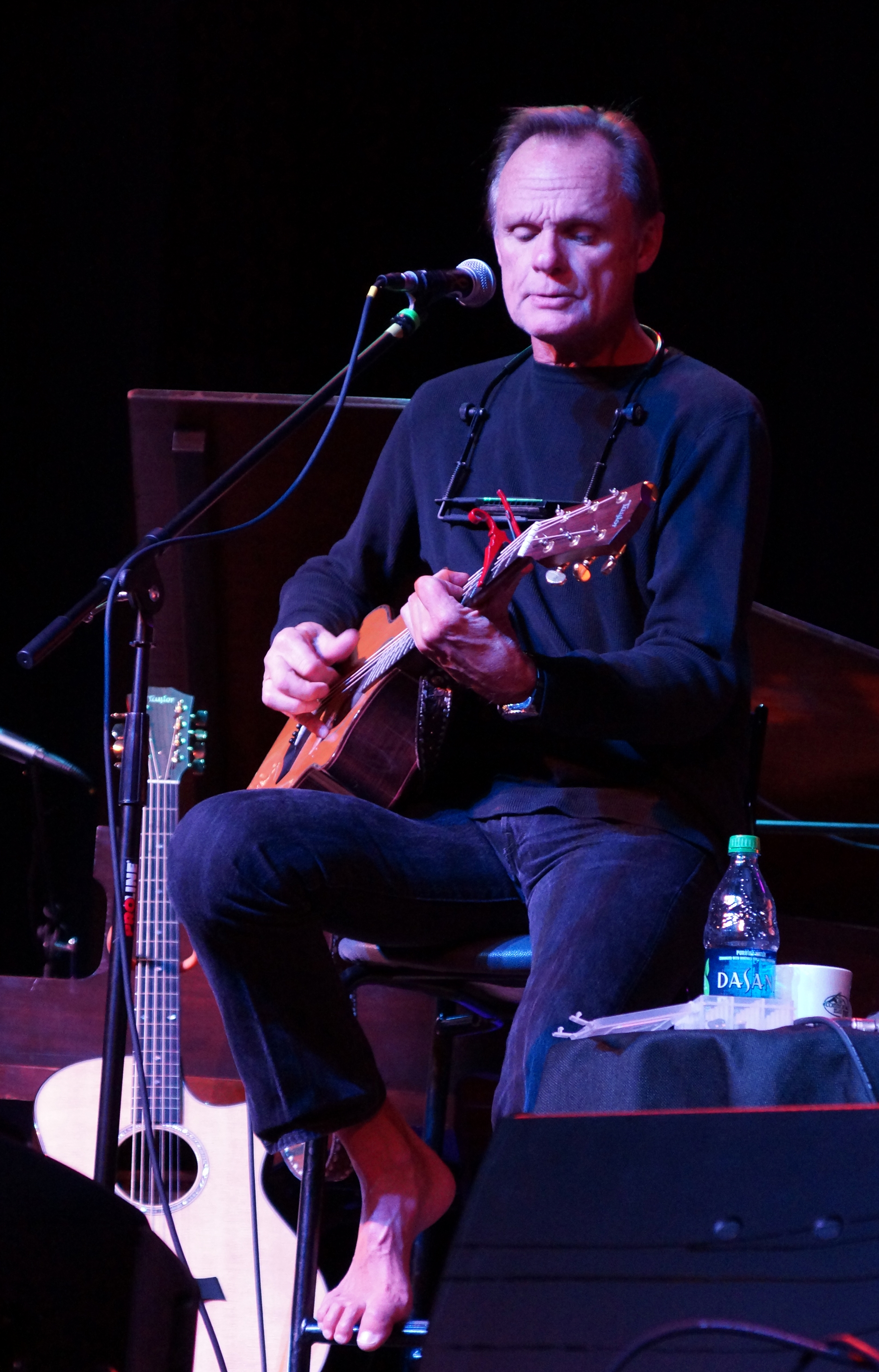
- Edwards at The Flying Monkey, Plymouth, New Hampshire on October 13, 2012

Background information
- Born: July 28, 1946 (age 80); Aitkin, Minnesota, U.S
- Origin: Boston, Massachusetts, U.S.
- Genres: Country rock, progressive country, folk rock
- Occupations: Musician, songwriter, actor
- Instruments: Vocals; guitar; harmonica
- Years active: 1960s–present
- Members: Stuart Schulman; Kenny White; Tom Snow; Al Anderson; Eric Lillequist; Rob Duquette; Bobby Chouinard; Bill Keith
- Website: jonathanedwards.net

Jonathan Edwards (born July 28, 1946) is an American country and folk singer-songwriter best known for his 1971 hit single "Sunshine".

== Early years ==
Jonathan Edwards was born John Evan Edwards on July 28, 1946, in Aitkin, Minnesota. At the age of six, he moved with his family to Virginia, where he grew up. At the age of eight, he began singing in church and learning to play piano by ear. While attending Fishburne Military School, he began playing guitar and composing his own songs. As a teenager he began performing in front of audiences.

I started on a $29 guitar and immediately started putting a band together, writing songs and learning all the contemporary folk songs of the time. I just loved it, loved everything about it, loved being in front of people playing music.

While studying art at Ohio University, he became a fixture at local clubs, playing with a variety of rock, folk, and blues bands.

== Career ==
In 1967, he and his band moved to Boston and played clubs throughout New England. With Joe Dolce on lead guitar, they played cover tunes as well as their own country-blues originals under various names, including the Headstone Circus, St. James Doorknob, and the Finite Minds, and they made an album for Metromedia Records as Sugar Creek.

In the early 1970s, Edwards left the band and began performing as a solo acoustic artist. He would later recall:

I liked the sound of bronze strings on rosewood better than steel strings on magnets, and so I walked out of that club in Vermont, rented myself a van and PA system, and started traveling around the colleges in New England by myself, without gigs, just setting up in the lobbies of dormitories on a Saturday. Pretty soon I started getting a following.

Edwards began opening for acts such as the Allman Brothers Band and B.B. King. He signed with Capricorn Records to record his first album, Jonathan Edwards (1971).

We took about a year recording the first album—different times, different studios, different sounds, different techniques. Recording was so new in '69 and '70. There was a song on the album called 'Please Find Me', and for some reason the engineer rolled over it. It got erased. We spent hours looking for it. We fired the engineer and put "Sunshine" in its place.

Like most of the songs on Jonathan Edwards, "Sunshine" was written shortly after Edwards left the band. "I felt really fresh, really liberated," he later recalled. "I just went out in the woods every day with my bottle of wine and guitar, sat by a lake near Boston and wrote down all those tunes, day after day." Regarding the theme of "Sunshine", Edwards commented, "It was just at the time of the Vietnam War and Nixon. It was looking bad out there. That song meant a lot to a lot of people during that time—especially me." "Sunshine" reached No. 4 on the Billboard Hot 100 chart, sold over one million copies, and was awarded a gold disc by the R.I.A.A. in January 1972.

Following the release of his debut album, Edwards moved out of the city to a farm in western Massachusetts, which provided the rural, country inspiration for his second album, Honky-Tonk Stardust Cowboy on the Atlantic Records label. This was an album of mostly self-penned acoustic, country-flavored songs about love and life and was closely followed by Have a Good Time For Me, also on Atlantic.

In 1973 he and his friends got together to record a live album called Lucky Day, named after a song he wrote in the truck on his way up to live in Nova Scotia. This "fresh-air break" lasted only a couple of months when his friend Emmylou Harris invited him to Los Angeles to sing backup on her album Elite Hotel. That led to a deal with Warner Bros. Records and two albums produced by Harris' husband/producer Brian Ahern: Rockin' Chair and Sailboat.

In 1979, Edwards moved back to the United States to New Hampshire, and then two years later back to Northern Virginia area where he had grown up. In 1983, he produced and recorded Blue Ridge with the bluegrass band, The Seldom Scene, for Sugar Hill Records. Then in 1987 he recorded a children's album, Little Hands, which was released on the small independent American Melody label. It was selected by the American Library Association as a Notable Children's Recording.

Turning to acting, Edwards toured as the lead in the Broadway musical Pump Boys and Dinettes. When the show reached Nashville, he met an old friend from the folk circuit, Wendy Waldman. She and Mike Robertson convinced Edwards to come to town and record a country album. "I've been making country-sounding records all my life, but never in Nashville. Yeah, let's do it." Edwards said. So, The Natural Thing was produced, recorded, and released on MCA/Curb Records in 1989. "I was crazy about the songs we selected from those great Nashville writers, and the acoustic-based production that Wendy and I put together was just a joy to make and to listen to. I count that as one of the best albums I've ever been involved with."

In the 1990s, Edwards continued to tour, doing session work, and producing his own music as well as that of other talents, such as Cheryl Wheeler ("Driving Home," "Mrs. Pinocci's Guitar"). He took part in the 1994 "Back to the Future" tour that also included Don McLean, Tom Rush, Jesse Colin Young, Steve Forbert and Al Stewart. In 1994 he released One Day Closer, his first solo album in five years, on his new record label, Rising Records. Man in the Moon, which includes several of Edwards' original songs, followed the end of 1997. In September 1997, Rising Records released a remixed, re-sequenced Among Us, a CD by Simon Townshend, younger brother of the Who's Pete Townshend. Edwards also scored the soundtrack for The Mouse, starring John Savage.

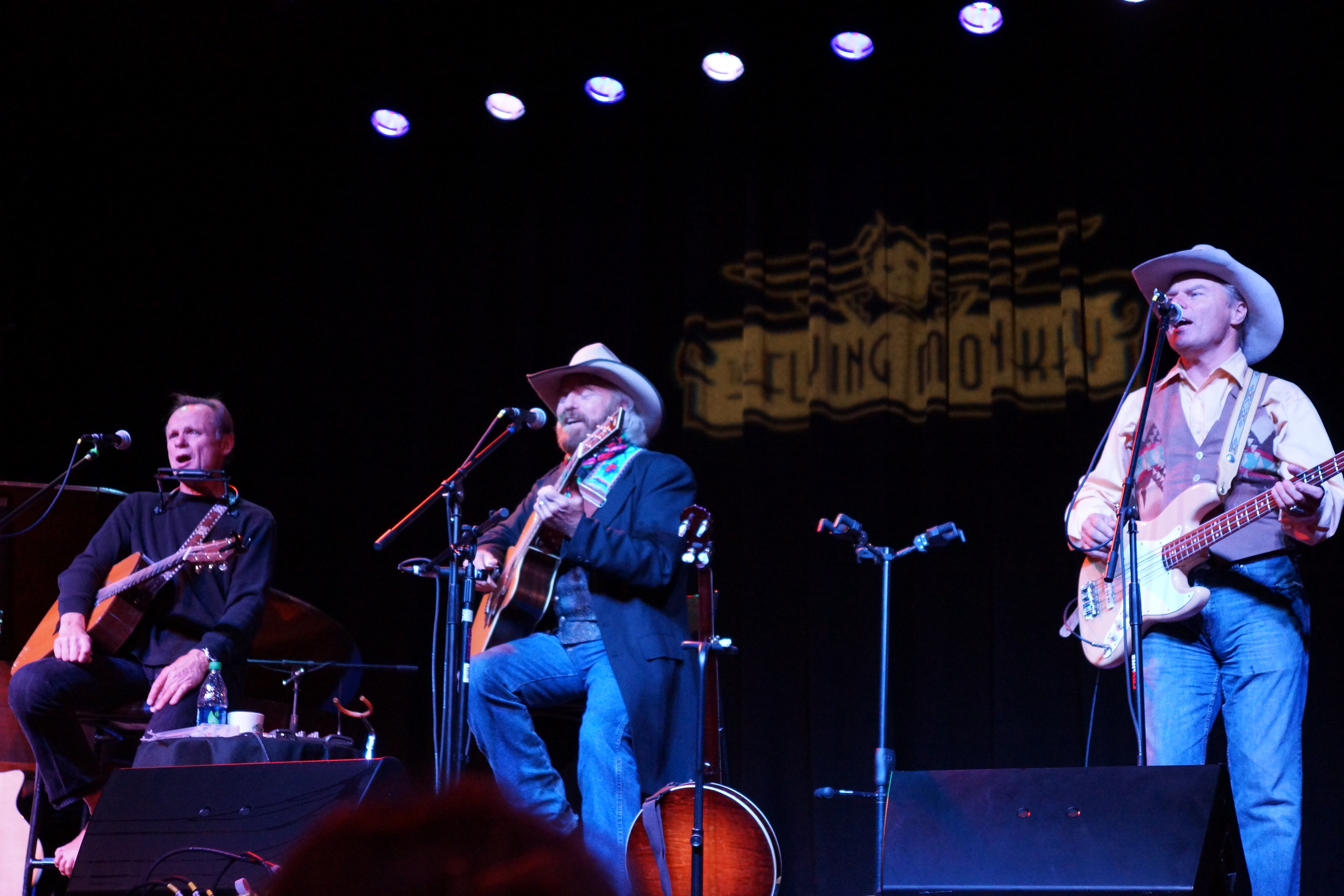
Jonathan Edwards, Michael Martin Murphey, and Gary Roller at The Flying Monkey, Plymouth, New Hampshire, October 13, 2012

In 2001, Edwards celebrated 30 years of "Sunshine" with a First Annual Farewell Tour with Kenny White on piano. In the 2000s, Edwards narrated and performed in a travel series for Media Artists entitled Cruising America's Waterways, which was purchased by PBS. Media Artists also released a companion album. Edwards participated in a second series, which started running on PBS-TV stations in May 2004.

In 2008, Edwards appeared in the romantic comedy film The Golden Boys, starring Bruce Dern, David Carradine, Charles Durning, Mariel Hemingway, and Rip Torn. Set in Cape Cod in 1905, the film featured Edwards in the role of Reverend Perley. In addition to acting, Edwards scored the film.

In the fall of 2012, he appeared with Michael Martin Murphey in a series of concerts throughout New England. He continues to tour both solo and with band members Tom Snow, Rick Brodsky, Rob Duquette and Joe K. Walsh.

Edwards lives in Portland, Maine.

== Discography ==
=== Albums ===
Year	Title	Label	Notes
1971	Jonathan Edwards	Capricorn	#40 in Australia.
1972	Honky-Tonk Stardust Cowboy	Atco	
1973	Have a Good Time for Me	Atco	
1974	Lucky Day	Atco	Live album
1976	Rockin' Chair	Reprise	
1977	Sailboat	Warner Bros.	
1980	Live!	Chronic	Live album
1985	Blue Ridge	Sugar Hill	With The Seldom Scene
1987	Little Hands	American Melody	
1989	The Natural Thing	MCA	
1994	One Day Closer	Rising Records	
1998	Man in the Moon	Rising Records	
2001	Cruising America's Waterways		Live album
2006	Live in Massachusetts	Rising Records	Live album
2009	Rollin' Along: Live in Holland	Strictly Country	Live album
2011	My Love Will Keep	Appleseed Recordings	Studio album
2015	Tomorrow's Child	Rising Records	
2015	Top 40	Rising Records	Original recordings digitally remastered by Pat Keane Mastering
2021	Right Where I Am	Rising Records	Mixed by Todd Hutchisen, Acadia Recording Company

=== Singles ===
Year	Single	Peak positions						Album
Year	Single	US	US AC	US Country	AUS	CAN	CAN AC	Album
1971	"Sunshine"	4	7	—	45	3	11	Jonathan Edwards
1972	"Train of Glory" / "Everybody Knows Her"	101	—	—	—	70	—	Jonathan Edwards
1973	"Stop and Start It All Again"	112	—	—	—	—	—	Honky-Tonk Stardust Cowboy
1988	"We Need to Be Locked Away"	—	—	64	—	—	—	The Natural Thing
1988	"Look What We Made (When We Made Love)"	—	—	56	—	—	—	The Natural Thing
1989	"It's a Natural Thing"	—	—	59	—	—	—	The Natural Thing
1990	"Listen to the Radio"	—	—	82	—	—	—	The Natural Thing
"—" denotes releases that did not chart

=== Videos ===
Year	Title	Label	Notes
2001	Cruising America's Waterways	PBS	Live concert

=== Appearances ===
- Elite Hotel (1976) by Emmylou Harris
- Hometown Girl (1987) by Mary Chapin Carpenter
- Grandma’s Patchwork Quilt (1987) by Cathy Fink, John McCutcheon, Larry Penn, and Phil and Naomi Rosenthal (vocals on “Three Blind Mice”and “Oh Susannah”, harmonica on “Oh Susannah”)
- Womanly Arts (2004) by Liz Meyer
- Anchorman (2006)
