= John Ware (musician) =

American drummer (born 1944)

- Born: John A. Ware; May 2, 1944 (age 81); Tulsa, Oklahoma
- Genres: Country music, country rock
- Occupation: Musician
- Instrument: Drums
- Formerly of: Stone Poneys, the First National Band
- Website: www.johnaware.com

John A. Ware (born May 2, 1944 in Tulsa, Oklahoma) is an American drummer and percussionist known primarily for his session and live performance work.

== Biography ==
=== Early years ===
Ware was born in Tulsa but grew up in Oklahoma City. As a child, he first had piano lessons and then drum lessons. By age 14, he was playing with local bands, and at age 16, he met Jesse Ed Davis. In 1961, Ware and Davis attended every Ronnie Hawkins and the Hawks gig they could get into, with Ware paying special attention to drummer Levon Helm.

=== West Coast Pop Art Experimental Band ===
In 1965, Ware was playing in the band Laughing Wind, along with Danny Harris (guitar), Shaun Harris (bass), and Michael Lloyd (guitar) and they joined up with attorney Bob Markley, who renamed them the West Coast Pop Art Experimental Band. Ware was a member of the band from 1966 to 1968.

=== The Corvettes and Linda Ronstadt ===
Ware was a member of the Corvettes, a band which also included Chris Darrow (guitar, vocals), Jeff Hanna (guitar, vocals), John London (bass), and Bernie Leadon (guitar, vocals). They recorded only two 45 singles on the Dot label, both produced by Michael Nesmith. Linda Ronstadt recruited the Corvettes to be the second version of her touring band Stone Poneys.

=== Michael Nesmith and the First National Band ===
During his time with the Stone Poneys, Ware became friends with Michael Nesmith who wrote Ronstadt's hit single, "Different Drum". As Nesmith's contract with The Monkees came to an end, it was Ware's idea that they should form the First National Band, with Ware, London, Nesmith, and Red Rhodes (pedal steel guitar). The First National Band recorded three albums in a year's span, but couldn't stay together after that. They did generate a radio hit record in that short time, "Joanne".

Ware also participated in the 1977 concert that was recorded for Nesmith's Live at the Palais album, released in 1978.

=== Emmylou Harris and The Hot Band ===
After the First National Band broke up, Ware spent time as a session drummer in California and doing some touring with John Stewart, Hoyt Axton, and Ian Matthews. In 1973, after being contacted by Kenny Edwards from the original Stone Poneys, he once again drummed with Linda Ronstadt.

In 1975, Ware was contacted by manager Eddie Tickner, and he became a member of Emmylou Harris' Hot Band, along with Glen D Hardin, James Burton, Hank Devito, Emory Gordy, Jr., and Rodney Crowell. Ware played with Harris until 1982.

In 2004, the original Hot Band (including Ware) was reunited for one night in Nashville when ASCAP presented Harris with the Founders Award.

In 2013, Harris and Rodney Crowell recorded an album of duets, Old Yellow Moon. Ware was one of the supporting musicians, as were other Hot Band alumni (DeVito, Burton, Hardin, and Gordy).

=== Wild Mountain ===
For a few months in 2017 Ware was a member of Wild Mountain in Denver, an Irish music / bluegrass band. Other members include Dave Sweeney (bass), Renee Fine (violin), Mike Nile (guitar, mandolin, vocals), Sarah Jones (vocals, percussion), and David Potter (guitar, banjo, vocals).

== Discography ==
=== As a member of the First National Band ===
- 1970: Loose Salute (RCA Victor)
- 1970: Magnetic South (RCA Victor)
- 1971: Nevada Fighter (RCA Victor)

=== With Emmylou Harris and the Hot Band ===
- 1975: Elite Hotel (Reprise)
- 1976: Luxury Liner (album) (Warner Bros.)
- 1978: Quarter Moon in a Ten Cent Town (Warner Bros.)
- 1979: Blue Kentucky Girl (Emmylou Harris album) (Warner Bros.)
- 1979: Light of the Stable (Warner Bros.)
- 1980: Roses in the Snow (Warner Bros.)
- 1981: Evangeline (Warner Bros.)
- 1981: Cimarron (Warner Bros.)
- 1982: Last Date (Warner Bros.)
- 1983: White Shoes (Warner Bros.)

=== As a member of Wild Mountain ===
- 2017: Wild Mountain - Greengrass (self-released)

=== As producer ===
- 1975: Steve Gillette - Back On The Street Again (Outpost)

=== Also appears on ===
- 1969: Ed Sanders - Sanders' Truckstop (Reprise)
- 1970: Compton & Batteau - In California (Columbia)
- 1970: Jesse Ed Davis - Jesse Davis (Atco)
- 1971: Hoyt Axton - Country Anthem (Capitol)
- 1972: Guy Carawan - The Telling Takes Me Home (Cur Non)
- 1972: Chris Darrow - Artist Proof (Fantasy)
- 1972: Maxfield Parrish - It's A Cinch To Give Legs To Old Hard-Boiled Eggs (Cur Non) recorded in 1969
- 1973: John Beland - John Edward Beland (Scepter)
- 1976: Jonathan Edwards - Rockin' Chair (Reprise)
- 1976: Harvest - Never Thirst Again (Pure Joy)
- 1976: Kaleidoscope - When Scopes Collide (Pacific Arts)
- 1976: Mary Kay Place - Tonite! At the Capri Lounge Loretta Haggers (Columbia)
- 1977: Karla Bonoff - Karla Bonoff (Columbia)
- 1977: Jackie DeShannon - You're the Only Dancer (Amherst)
- 1977: Jonathan Edwards - Sailboat (Warner Bros.)
- 1977: Walter Egan - Fundamental Roll (Columbia)
- 1978: Michael Nesmith - Live at the Palais (Pacific Arts)
- 1978: Rodney Crowell - Ain't Living Long Like This
- 1979: Rosanne Cash - Right or Wrong (Columbia)
- 1979: George Jones - My Very Special Guests (Epic)
- 1979: Albert Lee - Hiding (A&M)
- 1983: Larry Groce - Medicine Man (Broadbeach)
- 1983: Ricky Skaggs - Don't Cheat in Our Hometown (Sugar Hill)
- 1986: Janie Frickie - Black and White (Columbia)
- 2003: Robb Strandlund - Live (Industry) recorded in 1976
- 2013: Emmylou Harris and Rodney Crowell - Old Yellow Moon (Nonesuch)
