= John London =

American musician and songwriter (1942–2000)

John Carl Kuehne (February 6, 1942 – February 12, 2000), better known as John London, was an American musician and songwriter, and was involved in several Hollywood television and movie productions. He was most notably associated with both the band The Monkees and their television series.

== Biography ==
Kuehne was born in Brazos County, Texas. He became a friend of Michael Nesmith, who had played with him (mostly bass guitar) in several working bands. He accompanied Nesmith and then-wife Phyllis Barbour to California to try their luck in the Los Angeles-area music scene. When Nesmith was cast in The Monkees, he recruited London as his stand-in on the set, and when the originally-fictitious band began playing on their own recordings, London sometimes served as bassist, allowing Peter Tork to play keyboards, banjo, or another instrument. London also co-wrote "Don't Call On Me" with Nesmith, which was featured on Pisces, Aquarius, Capricorn & Jones Ltd. and a second-season TV episode, and appeared in bit parts on the show.

London also played bass for other L.A.-based bands including the Lewis and Clarke Expedition. In 1970, he and Nesmith, who had decided to leave the Monkees, formed a new group with pedal steel guitar ace Red Rhodes and drummer John Ware. Calling themselves the First National Band, the group signed with RCA Records. While praised for their country rock innovations, the band had little commercial success, and eventually broke up.

Years after the Monkees and the First National Band, London served as key grip on several different productions, including 48 Hrs., Who Will Love My Children?, The Karate Kid, Long Time Gone, and Hudson Hawk.

He died in Rockport, Texas on February 12, 2000, aged 58.
